= 2023–24 Deportivo Alavés season =

Deportivo Alavés
2023–24 season
- President: Alfonso Fernández de Trocóniz
- Head coach: Luis García
- Stadium: Mendizorrotza
- La Liga: 10th
- Copa del Rey: Round of 16
- Top goalscorer: League: Samu Omorodion (8); All: Samu Omorodion (8)
- Average home league attendance: 17,391
Home colours	Away colours

The 2023–24 season was Deportivo Alavés' 103rd season in existence and first season back in La Liga. They also competed in the Copa del Rey.

== Players ==
=== First-team squad ===
As of 22 December 2023

Note: Flags indicate national team as defined under FIFA eligibility rules; some limited exceptions apply. Players may hold more than one non-FIFA nationality.

No.	Pos.	Nation	Player
1	GK	ESP	Antonio Sivera
2	DF	ESP	Andoni Gorosabel
3	DF	ESP	Rubén Duarte (vice-captain)
4	DF	SRB	Aleksandar Sedlar
5	DF	MAR	Abdel Abqar
6	MF	ESP	Ander Guevara
7	MF	ESP	Álex Sola (on loan from Real Sociedad)
8	MF	ESP	Antonio Blanco
10	MF	ROU	Ianis Hagi (on loan from Rangers)
11	MF	ESP	Luis Rioja (captain)
14	DF	ARG	Nahuel Tenaglia
15	FW	ESP	Kike García
16	DF	ESP	Rafa Marín (on loan from Real Madrid)

No.	Pos.	Nation	Player
17	MF	ESP	Xeber Alkain
18	MF	ESP	Jon Guridi
19	DF	SRB	Nikola Maraš
20	FW	ARG	Giuliano Simeone (on loan from Atlético Madrid)
21	FW	ALG	Abde Rebbach
22	FW	ESP	Carlos Vicente
23	MF	URU	Carlos Benavídez
26	DF	ESP	Joseda Álvarez
27	DF	ESP	Javi López
29	FW	ARG	Joaquín Panichelli
31	GK	GEQ	Jesús Owono
32	FW	ESP	Samu Omorodion (on loan from Atlético Madrid)
33	GK	ARG	Adrián Rodríguez

=== Reserve team ===
Note: Flags indicate national team as defined under FIFA eligibility rules; some limited exceptions apply. Players may hold more than one non-FIFA nationality.

No.	Pos.	Nation	Player
28	MF	ESP	Ander Sánchez
30	MF	ESP	Tomás Mendes
34	FW	GEO	Giorgi Gagua
35	MF	ESP	Selu Diallo
39	DF	ESP	Eneko Ortiz

No.	Pos.	Nation	Player
41	GK	ESP	Gaizka García
42	MF	ESP	Unai Ropero
43	GK	ESP	Rubén Montero
44	DF	ESP	Victor Parada

=== Out on loan ===
Note: Flags indicate national team as defined under FIFA eligibility rules; some limited exceptions apply. Players may hold more than one non-FIFA nationality.

No.	Pos.	Nation	Player
—	MF	GEQ	Álex Balboa (at Huesca until 30 June 2024)
—	MF	MTN	Abdallahi Mahmoud (at Bellinzona until 30 June 2024)

No.	Pos.	Nation	Player
—	FW	ESP	Miguel de la Fuente (at Leganés until 30 June 2024)
—	FW	ESP	Alan Godoy (at Mirandés until 30 June 2024)

== Transfers ==
=== In ===
Pos.	Player	Transferred from	Fee	Date	Source
DF	(Serbia) Nikola Maraš	(Spain) Almería	€1,500,000	1 July 2023	
MF	(Spain) Ander Guevara	(Spain) Real Sociedad	€3,000,000	9 July 2023	
MF	(Spain) Antonio Blanco	(Spain) Real Madrid	Undisclosed	25 July 2023	
DF	(Spain) Andoni Gorosabel	(Spain) Real Sociedad	Undisclosed	11 August 2023	
FW	(Spain) Kike	(Spain) Osasuna	Free	13 August 2023	
DF	(Argentina) Nahuel Tenaglia	(Argentina) Talleres	€1,500,000	20 August 2023	
FW	(Spain) Samu Omorodion	(Spain) Atlético Madrid	Loan	26 August 2023	
FW	(Romania) Ianis Hagi	(Scotland) Rangers	Loan	27 August 2023	
FW	(Spain) Jon Karrikaburu	(Spain) Real Sociedad	Loan	1 September 2023	
DF	(Spain) Álex Sola	(Spain) Real Sociedad	Loan	1 September 2023	
MF	(Spain) Carlos Vicente	(Spain) Racing Ferrol	€600,000	1 January 2024	

=== Out ===
Pos.	Player	Transferred to	Fee	Date	Source
MF	(Spain) Jason	(Portugal) Arouca	Undisclosed	4 July 2023	
MF	(Spain) Toni Moya	(Spain) Real Zaragoza	Free	6 July 2023	
DF	(France) Florian Lejeune	(Spain) Rayo Vallecano	€2,500,000	28 July 2023	
MF	(Equatorial Guinea) Álex Balboa	(Spain) Huesca	Loan	8 August 2023	
MF	(Spain) Salva Sevilla	Released	Free	13 August 2023	
FW	(Senegal) Mamadou Sylla	(Spain) Real Valladolid	Free	1 September 2023	
FW	(Spain) Miguel de la Fuente	(Spain) Leganés	Loan	1 September 2023	
MF	(Mauritania) Abdallahi Mahmoud	(Switzerland) Bellinzona	Loan	8 September 2023	
FW	(Spain) Jon Karrikaburu	(Spain) Real Sociedad	Loan return	6 January 2024	

Notes
1.Exercised buy option.

== Pre-season and friendlies ==
Win Draw Loss

22 July 2023 Friendly	Racing Santander	1–2	Alavés	Guarnizo
19:00 UTC+2	Cedric 31'	Report	Lejeune 5'; Muñoz 69'	Stadium: Estadio El Pilar

26 July 2023 Friendly	Alavés	1–0	Tenerife	Benidorm
19:00 UTC+2	Sylla 85'			Stadium: Melia Villaitana Football Center

29 July 2023 Friendly	Valencia	2–0	Alavés	Valencia
19:00 UTC+2	Özkacar 41'; Tejón 64'			Stadium: Ciudad Deportiva de Paterna; Referee: Iván Caparrós Hernández

4 August 2023 Friendly	Osasuna	2–3	Alavés	Aranguren
11:00 UTC+2	Budimir 29'; Martínez 36'		Sedlar 11'; De la Fuente 20' (pen.), 46'	Stadium: Tajonar Facilities; Attendance: 600; Referee: Imanol Irurtzun Artola

6 August 2023 Friendly	Burgos	2–1	Alavés	Briviesca
19:00 UTC+2	Del Cerro 36'; López-Pinto 59'		Simeone 86'	Stadium: Campo Municipal de Futbol Briviesca; Attendance: 1,400; Referee: Imanol Irurtzun Artola

== Competitions ==
=== Overall record ===
Competition	First match	Last match	Starting round	Final position	Record							
Competition	First match	Last match	Starting round	Final position	Pld	W	D	L	GF	GA	GD	Win %
La Liga	14 August 2023	26 May 2024	Matchday 1	10th	38	12	10	16	36	46	−10	31.58
Copa del Rey	2 November 2023	16 January 2024	First round	Round of 16	4	3	0	1	12	2	+10	75.00
Total					42	15	10	17	48	48	+0	35.71

Source: Soccerway

=== La Liga ===
==== League table ====
Pos	Team	Pld	W	D	L	GF	GA	GD	Pts
8	Villarreal	38	14	11	13	65	65	0	53
9	Valencia	38	13	10	15	40	45	−5	49
10	Alavés	38	12	10	16	36	46	−10	46
11	Osasuna	38	12	9	17	45	56	−11	45
12	Getafe	38	10	13	15	42	54	−12	43

Source: LaLiga EA Sports
Rules for classification: 1) Points; 2) Head-to-head points; 3) Head-to-head goal difference; 4) Goal difference; 5) Goals scored; 6) Fair-play points
(Note: Head-to-head record is used only after all the matches between the teams in question have been played)

==== Results summary ====
Overall								Home						Away					
Pld	W	D	L	GF	GA	GD	Pts	W	D	L	GF	GA	GD	W	D	L	GF	GA	GD
38	12	10	16	36	46	−10	46	9	4	6	23	19	+4	3	6	10	13	27	−14

Source: La Liga

==== Results by round ====
Round	1	2	3	4	5	6	7	8	9	10	11	12	13	14	15	16	17	18	19	20	21	22	23	24	25	26	27	28	29	30	31	32	33	34	35	36	37	38
Ground	A	H	A	H	A	H	A	H	H	A	A	H	A	H	A	H	A	H	A	A	H	A	H	H	A	H	A	H	A	H	A	H	H	A	H	A	H	A
Result	L	W	L	W	L	L	D	L	D	D	L	W	L	W	D	L	L	L	D	W	W	W	L	D	D	D	L	W	L	L	L	W	W	W	D	L	W	D
Position	16	8	14	10	14	14	15	17	17	15	17	14	15	13	13	12	13	16	15	13	12	11	11	12	12	12	13	13	13	13	14	14	12	11	11	11	10	10

Source: La Liga
A = Away; H = Home; W = Win; D = Draw; L = Loss

==== Matches ====
The league fixtures were unveiled on 22 June 2023.

14 August 2023 1	Cádiz	1–0	Alavés	Cádiz
19:30 CEST (UTC+2)	San Emeterio 7'; L. Hernández (yellow card) 67'; Sobrino (yellow card) 75'; Fali (yellow card) 84'; Escalante (red card) 88'	Report	Sedlar (yellow card) 48'; Duarte (yellow card) 52'	Stadium: Nuevo Mirandilla; Attendance: 19,306; Referee: Isidro Díaz de Mera Escuderos

21 August 2023 2	Alavés	4–3	Sevilla	Vitoria-Gasteiz
19:00 CEST (UTC+2)	Rioja 7'; Duarte 44'; Kike 54', 59'; Gorosabel (yellow card) 90+1'	Report	Abqar 15' (o.g.); Lamela 41'; Gudelj (yellow card) 62'; Mir 90+7'; Torres (yellow card) 90+9'	Stadium: Mendizorrotza; Attendance: 15,308; Referee: Guillermo Cuadra Fernández

28 August 2023 3	Getafe	1–0	Alavés	Getafe
19:30 CEST (UTC+2)	Duarte (yellow card) 72'; Mayoral 84' (pen.)	Report	Abqar (yellow card) 83'; Alkain (yellow card) 83'	Stadium: Coliseum Alfonso Pérez; Attendance: 11,023; Referee: Juan Martínez Munuera

2 September 2023 4	Alavés	1–0	Valencia	Vitoria-Gasteiz
18:30 CEST (UTC+2)	Kike (penalty missed) 5'; Özkacar 6' (o.g.); Guridi (yellow card) 38'; Gorosabel (yellow card) 45+2'; Guevara (yellow card) 81'; Benavídez (yellow card) 89'	Report	Gayà (yellow card) 45+2'; Diakhaby (yellow card) 86'	Stadium: Mendizorrotza; Attendance: 16,641; Referee: Pablo González Fuertes

15 September 2023 5	Rayo Vallecano	2–0	Alavés	Madrid
21:00 CEST (UTC+2)	Aridane (yellow card) 19'; Palazón 43'; De Frutos 82'; De Tomás (yellow card) 90+5'	Report	Duarte (yellow card) 23'; Sola (yellow card) 41'; Hagi (yellow card) 90+5'	Stadium: Campo de Fútbol de Vallecas; Attendance: 12,116; Referee: Víctor García Verdura

22 September 2023 6	Alavés	0–2	Athletic Bilbao	Vitoria-Gasteiz
21:00 CEST (UTC+2)	Kike (yellow card) 45+1'; Abqar (yellow card) 78'	Report	I. Williams 18'; Berenguer (yellow card) 29'; Berchiche (yellow card) 31'; Sancet 76'	Stadium: Mendizorrotza; Attendance: 19,421; Referee: Alejandro Muñiz Ruiz

28 September 2023 7	Celta Vigo	1–1	Alavés	Vigo
19:00 CEST (UTC+2)	De la Torre (yellow card) 15' (yellow-red card) 68'; Marín 35' (o.g.); Beltrán (yellow card) 52'; Aspas (yellow card) 52'; Larsen (yellow card) 69'; Pérez (yellow card) 76'	Report	Omorodion 73'; López (yellow card) 78'; Marín (yellow card) 90+2'; Rioja (yellow card) 90+5'	Stadium: Balaídos; Attendance: 16,852; Referee: César Soto Grado

1 October 2023 8	Alavés	0–2	Osasuna	Vitoria-Gasteiz
16:15 CEST (UTC+2)	Blanco (red card) 49'; Guevara (yellow card) 64'; Omorodion (yellow card) 65'	Report	Arnaiz 36'; Peña (yellow card) 43'; Cruz (yellow card) 55'; Herrera (yellow card) 71'; Budimir 90'	Stadium: Mendizorrotza; Attendance: 19,035; Referee: Jorge Figueroa Vázquez

8 October 2023 9	Alavés	1–1	Real Betis	Vitoria-Gasteiz
18:30 CEST (UTC+2)	Rioja (yellow card) 32'; Bellerín 35' (o.g.); Omorodion (yellow card) 83'; Sedlar (yellow card) 90+3'	Report	Pérez 32'; Rodríguez (yellow card) 34'; Abner (yellow card) 71'; Isco (yellow card) 89'; Willian José (red card) 90+3'	Stadium: Mendizorrotza; Attendance: 18,288; Referee: Alejandro Hernández Hernández

22 October 2023 10	Villarreal	1–1	Alavés	Villarreal
18:30 CEST (UTC+2)	Pedraza (yellow card) 9'; Sørloth (yellow card) 23'; Femenía (yellow card) 35'; Comesaña (yellow card) 58'; Gerard 65' (pen.)	Report	Guevara (yellow card) 14'; Sivera (yellow card) 33'; Abqar (yellow card) 36'; Omorodion 48'	Stadium: Estadio de la Cerámica; Attendance: 17,498; Referee: Jesús Gil Manzano

29 October 2023 11	Atlético Madrid	2–1	Alavés	Madrid
21:00 CET (UTC+1)	Riquelme 26'; Morata 45+1'; Llorente (yellow card) 71'; Hermoso (yellow card) 73'; Oblak (yellow card) 73'	Report	Duarte (yellow card) 72'; Hagi (yellow card) 85'; Guevara 90+6'	Stadium: Cívitas Metropolitano; Attendance: 50,009; Referee: Alejandro Muñiz Ruiz

5 November 2023 12	Alavés	1–0	Almería	Vitoria-Gasteiz
14:00 CET (UTC+1)	Gorosabel (yellow card) 25'; Hagi (penalty missed) 45+1'; Sedlar 79'; Rioja (yellow card) 81'	Report	Melero (yellow card) 14'; Maximiano (yellow card) 52'; Robertone (yellow card) 59'	Stadium: Mendizorrotza; Attendance: 16,380; Referee: Juan Luis Pulido Santana

12 November 2023 13	Barcelona	2–1	Alavés	Barcelona
16:15 CET (UTC+1)	Lewandowski 53', 77' (pen.), (yellow card) 62'; Gündoğan (yellow card) 90+2'	Report	Omorodion 1'; Duarte (yellow card) 75'	Stadium: Estadi Olímpic Lluís Companys; Attendance: 38,183; Referee: Mateo Busquets Ferrer

24 November 2023 14	Alavés	3–1	Granada	Vitoria-Gasteiz
21:00 CET (UTC+1)	Guevara (yellow card) 9'; Torrente 11' (o.g.); Abde 38'; Omorodion 55'	Report	Villar (yellow card) 16'; Boyé (yellow card) 59'; Uzuni 86' (pen.); Sánchez (yellow card) 87'	Stadium: Mendizorrotza; Attendance: 15,705; Referee: Javier Alberola Rojas

3 December 2023 15	Mallorca	0–0	Alavés	Palma
14:00 CET (UTC+1)	Sánchez (yellow card) 24'; Amath (yellow card) 36'; S. Costa (yellow card) 46'; Morlanes (yellow card) 90+7'	Report	Guevara (yellow card) 27'; Abqar (yellow card) 72'	Stadium: Estadi Mallorca Son Moix; Attendance: 15,090; Referee: Jorge Figueroa Vázquez

9 December 2023 16	Alavés	0–1	Las Palmas	Vitoria-Gasteiz
14:00 CET (UTC+1)	Abqar (yellow card) 48'; Gorosabel (yellow card) 90+2'	Report	S. Cardona (yellow card) 9'; Rodríguez 31'; Muñoz (yellow card) 33'; Marvin (yellow card) 90+7'; Herrera (yellow card) 90+8'	Stadium: Mendizorrotza; Attendance: 15,971; Referee: José Luis Munuera Montero

18 December 2023 17	Girona	3–0	Alavés	Girona
21:00 CET (UTC+1)	Dovbyk 23', 59' (pen.); Portu 42'	Report	Tenaglia (yellow card) 39'	Stadium: Montilivi; Attendance: 11,812; Referee: Francisco José Hernández Maeso

21 December 2023 18	Alavés	0–1	Real Madrid	Vitoria-Gasteiz
21:30 CET (UTC+1)	Duarte (yellow card) 45'; López (yellow card) 82'; Tenaglia (yellow card) 90'	Report	Nacho (red card) 54'; Bellingham (yellow card) 85'; Vázquez 90+2'	Stadium: Mendizorrotza; Attendance: 19,275; Referee: Isidro Díaz de Mera Escuderos

2 January 2024 19	Real Sociedad	1–1	Alavés	San Sebastián
19:15 CET (UTC+1)	Remiro (red card) 36'; Zubeldia (yellow card) 45+2'; Fernández (yellow card) 74'; Traoré (yellow card) 74'; Zubimendi 90+6'; Oyarzabal (yellow card) 90+8'; Sadiq (yellow card) 90+11'	Report	Abde (yellow card) 50'; Omorodion (yellow card) 59'; Rioja 76' (pen.); Sivera (yellow card) 87'; Kike (yellow card) 90+3'	Stadium: Reale Arena; Attendance: 34,051; Referee: Víctor García Verdura

12 January 2024 20	Sevilla	2–3	Alavés	Seville
21:00 CET (UTC+1)	Soumaré (yellow card) 50'; Marcão (yellow card) 58'; Navas (yellow card) 63'; Mir 70'; Mariano (yellow card) 73'; Ocampos 82' (pen.)	Report	Marín (yellow card) 23'; Tenaglia 26'; Kike 40', (yellow card) 90+1'; Benavídez (yellow card) 81'; Duarte 90'	Stadium: Ramón Sánchez Pizjuán; Attendance: 34,225; Referee: Alejandro Hernández Hernández

19 January 2024 21	Alavés	1–0	Cádiz	Vitoria-Gasteiz
21:00 CET (UTC+1)	Rioja 51' (pen.)	Report	Guardiola (yellow card) 22'; Alejo (yellow card) 49'; Lucas Pires (yellow card) 50'; Fali (yellow card) 68'	Stadium: Mendizorrotza; Attendance: 15,838; Referee: Alejandro Muñiz Ruiz

26 January 2024 22	Almería	0–3	Alavés	Almería
21:00 CET (UTC+1)	González (yellow card) 45+2'	Report	Gorosabel (yellow card) 3'; Omorodion 10', 88'; Rioja 52' (pen.); Guevara (yellow card) 79'	Stadium: Power Horse Stadium; Attendance: 13,817; Referee: Miguel Ángel Ortiz Arias

3 February 2024 23	Alavés	1–3	Barcelona	Vitoria-Gasteiz
18:30 CET (UTC+1)	Omorodion (yellow card) 12', (goal) 51'; Sola (yellow card) 90+7'	Report	Lewandowski 22'; Gündoğan 49'; Vitor Roque 63', (yellow card) 67' (yellow-red card) 72'	Stadium: Mendizorrotza; Attendance: 19,480; Referee: Juan Martínez Munuera

10 February 2024 24	Alavés	1–1	Villarreal	Vitoria-Gasteiz
14:00 CET (UTC+1)	Omorodion 25'	Report	Cuenca 42', (yellow card) 44'; Sørloth (yellow card) 71'	Stadium: Mendizorrotza; Attendance: 14,523; Referee: Mario Melero López

18 February 2024 25	Real Betis	0–0	Alavés	Seville
21:00 CET (UTC+1)	Ezzalzouli (yellow card) 31'; Roca (yellow card) 45+1'; Papastathopoulos (yellow card) 71'; Pezzella (yellow card) 79'; Miranda (yellow card) 82'	Report	Marín (yellow card) 37'; Abqar (yellow card) 72'	Stadium: Benito Villamarín; Attendance: 43,514; Referee: Mateo Busquets Ferrer

24 February 2024 26	Alavés	1–1	Mallorca	Vitoria-Gasteiz
18:30 CET (UTC+1)	Benavídez 76'	Report	Vidal (yellow card) 54'; Nastasić 88'; Larin (yellow card) 90+6'	Stadium: Mendizorrotza; Attendance: 16,102; Referee: Víctor García Verdura

4 March 2024 27	Osasuna	1–0	Alavés	Pamplona
21:00 CET (UTC+1)	Torró (yellow card) 16'; Herrando (yellow card) 45+1'; Budimir 76'	Report	Vicente (yellow card) 51'	Stadium: El Sadar; Attendance: 17,215; Referee: Jorge Figueroa Vázquez

10 March 2024 28	Alavés	1–0	Rayo Vallecano	Vitoria-Gasteiz
14:00 CET (UTC+1)	Abqar (yellow card) 28'; Gorosabel 44'; Blanco (yellow card) 90+7'	Report	Palazón (yellow card) 13'; Espino (yellow card) 90'	Stadium: Mendizorrotza; Attendance: 16,519; Referee: José Luis Munuera Montero

16 March 2024 29	Athletic Bilbao	2–0	Alavés	Bilbao
21:00 CET (UTC+1)	Guruzeta 32', 37'; N. Williams (yellow card) 54'	Report	Rioja (penalty missed) 31'; Benavídez (yellow card) 80'; Abqar (yellow card) 86'; Blanco (yellow card) 90+2'	Stadium: San Mamés; Attendance: 48,257; Referee: Alejandro Muñiz Ruiz

31 March 2024 30	Alavés	0–1	Real Sociedad	Vitoria-Gasteiz
18:30 CEST (UTC+2)	Guevara (yellow card) 62'; Abqar (yellow card) 86'	Report	Pacheco 59', (yellow card) 89'; Merino (yellow card) 80'	Stadium: Mendizorrotza; Attendance: 18,575; Referee: Francisco José Hernández Maeso

14 April 2024 31	Granada	2–0	Alavés	Granada
16:15 CEST (UTC+2)	Uzuni 9' (pen.), (yellow card) 45'; Boyé 38'; Gumbau (yellow card) 45+3'; Miguel Ángel (yellow card) 60'	Report	Gorosabel (yellow card) 20'; Tenaglia (yellow card) 45'	Stadium: Nuevo Los Cármenes; Attendance: 13,398; Referee: Víctor García Verdura

21 April 2024 32	Alavés	2–0	Atlético Madrid	Vitoria-Gasteiz
18:30 CEST (UTC+2)	Guridi (yellow card) 2'; López (yellow card) 6'; Benavídez 15', (yellow card) 49'; Abqar (yellow card) 33'; Marín (yellow card) 68'; Rioja 90+2'	Report	Correa (yellow card) 45'; Azpilicueta (yellow card) 50'; Savić (yellow card) 68'	Stadium: Mendizorrotza; Attendance: 18,719; Referee: Jesús Gil Manzano

27 April 2024 33	Alavés	3–0	Celta Vigo	Vitoria-Gasteiz
18:30 CEST (UTC+2)	Duarte (yellow card) 20'; Blanco (yellow card) 22'; Simeone 48'; Guridi 54'; Sivera (yellow card) 82'; Benavídez 86'	Report	Pérez (yellow card) 21'; Mingueza (yellow card) 86'; Álvarez (yellow card) 88'	Stadium: Mendizorrotza; Attendance: 18,039; Referee: Juan Luis Pulido Santana

5 May 2024 34	Valencia	0–1	Alavés	Valencia
18:30 CEST (UTC+2)	Duro (yellow card) 78'	Report	Blanco (yellow card) 11'; Tenaglia (yellow card) 22'; López 68'; Omorodion (yellow card) 77'	Stadium: Mestalla; Attendance: 44,643; Referee: Mario Melero López

10 May 2024 35	Alavés	2–2	Girona	Vitoria-Gasteiz
21:00 CEST (UTC+2)	Guridi 12', 90+9'; Rioja (yellow card) 90+4'; Owono (yellow card) 90+4'; Marín (yellow card) 90+9'	Report	E. García 4'; Herrera 44', (yellow card) 90+8'; Martínez (yellow card) 88'	Stadium: Mendizorrotza; Attendance: 17,906; Referee: José Luis Munuera Montero

14 May 2024 36	Real Madrid	5–0	Alavés	Madrid
21:30 CEST (UTC+2)	Bellingham 10'; Vinícius 27', 70', (yellow card) 52'; Valverde 45+1'; Güler 81'	Report	Duarte (yellow card) 50'	Stadium: Santiago Bernabéu; Attendance: 68,954; Referee: Mateo Busquets Ferrer

18 May 2024 37	Alavés	1–0	Getafe	Vitoria-Gasteiz
21:00 CEST (UTC+2)	Vicente 12'; Simeone (yellow card) 15'; Benavídez (yellow card) 37'; Tenaglia (yellow card) 50'; Blanco (yellow card) 80'; Omorodion (yellow card) 90+5'	Report	Carmona (yellow card) 11'; Maksimović (yellow card) 17'; Rico (yellow card) 45'; Latasa (yellow card) 71'; Aleñá (yellow card) 77'; Moriba (yellow card) 78' (yellow-red card) 90+5'	Stadium: Mendizorrotza; Attendance: 18,709; Referee: Jorge Figueroa Vázquez

26 May 2024 38	Las Palmas	1–1	Alavés	Las Palmas
15:15 WEST (UTC+1)	M. Cardona 71'; González (yellow card) 74'; Moleiro (yellow card) 76'	Report	Simeone (penalty missed) 33'; Hagi (yellow card) 37'; Vicente 50'	Stadium: Estadio Gran Canaria; Attendance: 23,043; Referee: Francisco José Hernández Maeso

=== Copa del Rey ===
2 November 2023 First round	Deportivo Murcia	0–10	Alavés	Murcia
21:00 CET (UTC+1)		Report	Abde 7', 38'; Duarte 13'; Blanco (yellow card) 24'; Marín (yellow card) 30'; Alkain 52', 60'; Tenaglia (yellow card) 57'; Hagi 63', 80'; Karrikaburu 68', 75', 89'	Stadium: Nueva Condomina; Attendance: 2,500; Referee: José Luis Munuera Montero
Note: The match was played at the Nueva Condomina in Murcia, instead of Deportivo Murcia's regular stadium, the José Manuel Aroca, which did not meet the broadcasting requirements.

6 December 2023 Second round	Terrassa	0–1	Alavés	Terrassa
16:00 CET (UTC+1)		Report	Alkain 21', (yellow card) 43'; Sola (yellow card) 90+3'	Stadium: Estadi Olímpic; Attendance: 7,000; Referee: Jesús Gil Manzano

6 January 2024 Round of 32	Alavés	1–0	Real Betis	Vitoria-Gasteiz
20:00 CET (UTC+1)	Benavídez 57'; Duarte (yellow card) 88'	Report	Roca (yellow card) 8'; Mendy (yellow card) 72'	Stadium: Mendizorrotza; Attendance: 13,567; Referee: Javier Iglesias Villanueva

16 January 2024 Round of 16	Athletic Bilbao	2–0	Alavés	Bilbao
21:00 CET (UTC+1)	Villalibre 28', 60'	Report	Benavídez (yellow card) 71'; Marín (yellow card) 90'	Stadium: San Mamés; Attendance: 45,233; Referee: César Soto Grado

== Statistics ==
=== Goalscorers ===
Position	Player	La Liga	Copa del Rey	Total
FW	(Spain) Samu Omorodion	8	0	8
MF	(Spain) Luis Rioja	5	0	5
MF	(Uruguay) Carlos Benavídez	3	1	4
MF	(Spain) Xeber Alkain	0	3	3
DF	(Spain) Rubén Duarte	2	1	3
MF	(Spain) Jon Guridi	3	0	3
FW	(Spain) Jon Karrikaburu	0	3	3
FW	(Spain) Kike	3	0	3
MF	(Algeria) Abde Rebbach	1	2	3
MF	(Romania) Ianis Hagi	0	2	2
MF	(Spain) Carlos Vicente	2	0	2
