= 2022–23 Deportivo Alavés season =

Deportivo Alavés
2022–23 season
- President: Alfonso Fernández de Trocóniz
- Head coach: Luis García
- Stadium: Mendizorrotza
- Segunda División: 3rd (promoted via play-offs)
- Copa del Rey: Round of 16
- Top goalscorer: League: Luis Rioja (10); All: Luis Rioja (10)
Home colours	Away colours	Third colours

The 2022–23 season was the 102nd season in the existence of Deportivo Alavés. Alavés played in the Segunda División, the second division of men's professional football in Spain, after being relegated from the Spanish first division La Liga the previous season, finishing in last place.

== Transfers ==
=== Summer window ===
Deals officialized beforehand were effective starting 1 July 2022.

==== In ====
Date	Pos.	Player	Age	Moving from	Fee	Notes	Source
1 July 2022	LW	(Algeria) Abderrahman Rebbach	23	(Spain) Alavés B	Free		
11 July 2022	CM	(Spain) Jon Guridi	27	(Spain) Real Sociedad	Free		
5 July 2022	CB	(Serbia) Aleksandar Sedlar	30	(Spain) Mallorca	Free		
1 July 2022	DM	(Uruguay) Carlos Benavídez	24	(Argentina) Independiente	Free		
1 July 2022	LW	(Spain) Xeber Alkain	25	(Spain) Real Sociedad B	Free		
1 July 2022	CM	(Spain) Salva Sevilla	38	(Spain) Mallorca	Free		

==== Loan in ====
Date	Pos.	Player	Age	Moving from	Fee	Notes	Source
9 July 2022	CB	(Colombia) Anderson Arroyo	22	(England) Liverpool	Free		
11 August 2022	CB	(Serbia) Nikola Maraš	26	(Spain) UD Almería	Free		

==== Loan returns ====
Date	Pos.	Player	Age	Moving from	Fee	Notes	Source
30 June 2022	CB	(Spain) Alberto Rodríguez Baró	24	(Spain) CF Fuenlabrada	Free		
30 June 2022	CF	(Senegal) Mamadou Sylla	28	(Spain) Rayo Vallecano	Free		
30 June 2022	LW	(Panama) José Luis Rodríguez	24	(Spain) Sporting Gijón	Free		

==== Out ====
Date	Pos.	Player	Age	Moving to	Fee	Notes	Source
4 August 2022	RB	(Spain) Carlos Isaac	24	(Portugal) Vizela	Free	After return from loan	
29 July 2022	LB	(Spain) Saúl García	27	(Spain) Racing	Free	After return from loan	
28 July 2022	LW	(Spain) Borja Sainz	21	(Turkey) Giresunspor	Undisclosed	After return from loan	
18 July 2022	RB	(Spain) Martín Aguirregabiria	26	(Portugal) Famalicão	Free	End of contract	
1 July 2022	DM	(Spain) Pere Pons	29	Unattached	Free	End of contract	
2 August 2022	CM	(Spain) Tomás Pina	34	(China) HNS. Longmen	Free	End of contract	
1 July 2022	CB	(Spain) Víctor Laguardia	32	Unattached	Free	End of contract	
1 July 2022	RW	(Spain) Édgar Méndez	32	(Mexico) Necaxa	Free		
1 July 2022	CF	(Spain) Joselu	32	(Spain) Espanyol	Free		
10 August 2022	GK	(Spain) Fernando Pacheco	30	(Spain) UD Almería	Free		
5 August 2022	DM	(Spain) Antonio Perera	25	(Bulgaria) Botev Plovdiv	€113,000		

==== Loans out ====
Date	Pos.	Player	Age	Moving to	Fee	Notes	Source
29 July 2022	CB	(France) Florian Lejeune	31	(Spain) Rayo Vallecano	Free		

==== Loans ended ====
Date	Pos.	Player	Age	Moving to	Fee	Notes	Source
30 June 2022	SS	(Spain) Manu Vallejo	25	(Spain) Valencia	Free		
30 June 2022	CM	(Argentina) Gonzalo Escalante	29	(Italy) Lazio	Free		
30 June 2022	AM	(Spain) Manu García	24	(Spain) Sporting Gijón	Free		
30 June 2022	RW	(Uruguay) Facundo Pellistri	20	(England) Manchester United	Free		
30 June 2022	DM	(Senegal) Mamadou Loum	25	(Portugal) Porto	Free		
30 June 2022	CB	(United States) Matt Miazga	26	(England) Chelsea	Free		

=== Winter window ===
Deals officialized beforehand will be effective starting 1 January 2023.

== Pre-season and friendlies ==
Win Draw Loss Fixtures

16 July 2022 Friendly	Alavés	1–1 (a.e.t.) (4–2 p)	Burgos	Vitoria-Gasteiz, Spain
19:00 CEST (UTC+2)	Rebbach 10'; Balboa (yellow card) 59'	Report	Valcarce 45'; Rodríguez (yellow card) 46'	Stadium: Mendizorroza
	Penalties
	Jason (penalty scored); Mahmoud (penalty scored); Moya (penalty scored); Rioja (penalty scored)		(penalty missed) Malbašić; (penalty scored) Berjón; (penalty scored) Sierra; (penalty missed) Elgezabal

20 July 2022 Friendly	Alavés	0–4	Wolves	Vitoria-Gasteiz, Spain
19:00 CEST (UTC+2)		Report	Jiménez 22' (pen.); Neto 43'; Podence 51'; Kilman 88'	Stadium: Mendizorroza

23 July 2022 Friendly	Alavés	5–0	CF Intercity	Vitoria-Gasteiz, Spain
19:00 CEST (UTC+2)	Sylla 60' (pen.); Guridi 63'; Rioja 71'; Rebbach 72'; Lejeune 80'	Report		Stadium: Mendizorroza

26 July 2022 Friendly	Beşiktaş	1–2	Alavés	Beşiktaş, Turkey
19:00 CEST (UTC+2)	Muleka 2'; Vardar (yellow card) 24'; Welinton (yellow card) 41'; Rosier (yellow card) 86'; Saïss (yellow card) 92'	Report	Guridi 54'; de la Fuente (yellow card) 55'; Duarte (yellow card) 60'; de la Fuente 66'	Stadium: Vodafone Park

30 July 2022 Friendly	Alavés	0–0	Real Oviedo	Vitoria-Gasteiz, Spain
18:00 CEST (UTC+2)	de la Fuente (yellow card) 40'	Report		Stadium: Mendizorroza

3 August 2022 Friendly	Alavés	1–1 (a.e.t.) (9–8 p)	Sporting Gijón	Vitoria-Gasteiz, Spain
18:30 CEST (UTC+2)	Abqar 10'; Arroyo (yellow card) 44'; Rebbach (yellow card) 62'	Report	Argüelles 56'	Stadium: Mendizorroza
	Penalties
	Moya (penalty scored); de la Fuente (penalty scored); Rebbach (penalty scored); Rioja (penalty missed); Benavídez (penalty scored); Guridi (penalty scored); Tenaglia (penalty scored); Sedlar (penalty scored); López (penalty scored); Abqar (penalty scored)		(penalty missed) Otero; (penalty scored) Izquierdoz; (penalty scored) Díaz; (penalty scored) Campuzano; (penalty scored) Đurđević; (penalty scored) Rosas; (penalty scored) Somolinos; (penalty scored) Ángel; (penalty scored) Rivera; (penalty missed) Argüelles

6 August 2022 Friendly	Athletic Bilbao	1–1	Alavés	Bilbao, Basque Country, Spain
11:00 CEST (UTC+2)	Villalibre 25'	Report	Sylla 83'	Stadium: San Mamés Stadium

== Competitions ==
=== Overall record ===
Competition	First match	Last match	Starting round	Final position	Record							
Competition	First match	Last match	Starting round	Final position	Pld	W	D	L	GF	GA	GD	Win %
Segunda División	13 August 2022	27 May 2023	Matchday 1	4th	42	19	14	9	47	33	+14	45.24
Copa del Rey	13 November 2022	17 January 2023	First round	Round of 16	4	3	0	1	3	1	+2	75.00
Total					46	22	14	10	50	34	+16	47.83

Source: FBREF

=== Segunda División ===
==== League table ====
Pos	Team	Pld	W	D	L	GF	GA	GD	Pts	Qualification or relegation
2	Las Palmas (P)	42	18	18	6	49	29	+20	72 (Note: Overall goal difference: Las Palmas +20, Levante +16.)	Promotion to La Liga
3	Levante	42	18	18	6	46	30	+16	72	Qualification for promotion play-offs
4	Alavés (O, P)	42	19	14	9	47	33	+14	71 (Note: Alavés finished ahead of Eibar on head-to-head points: Eibar 0–0 Alavés, Alavés 2–0 Eibar.)	Qualification for promotion play-offs
5	Eibar	42	19	14	9	45	36	+9	71	Qualification for promotion play-offs
6	Albacete	42	17	16	9	58	47	+11	67	Qualification for promotion play-offs

Source: LaLiga SmartBank
Rules for classification: 1) points; 2) head-to-head points; 3) head-to-head goal difference; 4) goal difference; 5) number of goals scored
(O) Play-off winners; (P) Promoted
Notes:

Notes

1. Reserve teams are not eligible for promotion to the same league as the first team.

==== Results summary ====
Overall								Home						Away					
Pld	W	D	L	GF	GA	GD	Pts	W	D	L	GF	GA	GD	W	D	L	GF	GA	GD
42	19	14	9	47	33	+14	71	13	7	1	28	11	+17	6	7	8	19	22	−3

Source: LaLiga SmartBank

==== Results by round ====
Round	1	2	3	4	5	6	7	8	9	10	11	12	13	14	15	16	17	18	19	20	21	22	23	24	25	26	27	28	29	30	31	32	33	34	35	36	37	38	39	40	41	42
Ground	A	H	A	H	A	H	A	H	A	H	A	H	H	A	H	A	H	A	A	H	A	H	A	H	A	H	A	H	H	A	H	A	H	A	H	A	H	A	H	A	H	A
Result	W	W	D	D	W	W	D	W	L	D	W	D	W	D	W	D	W	L	L	L	L	W	L	W	W	W	W	W	D	L	D	L	W	W	D	D	W	L	D	D	W	D
Position	4	3	4	5	2	1	2	1	1	2	2	2	2	2	1	1	1	3	3	5	5	4	5	4	4	4	3	2	3	5	5	5	5	4	4	4	2	4	3	3	3	4

Source: BDFútbol
A = Away; H = Home; W = Win; D = Draw; L = Loss; = Promotion to La Liga; = Qualification to promotion play-offs; = Relegation to Primera Federación

==== Matches ====
13 August 2022 1	Leganés	1–2	Alavés	Leganés
21:00 CEST (UTC+2)	Miramón (yellow card) 31'; Pardo (yellow card) 66'; García 68'; Nyom (yellow card) 74'	Report	de la Fuente 20'; Abqar (yellow card) 38'; Alkain (yellow card) 60'; Sedlar (yellow card) 74'; Sylla 75'	Stadium: Estadio Municipal de Butarque; Referee: Victor García Verdura

19 August 2022 2	Alavés	1–0	Mirandés	Vitoria-Gasteiz
22:00 CEST (UTC+2)	Alkain 43'; Lopez (yellow card) 60'; Rioja (yellow card) 61'	Report	Parra (yellow card) 40'; Martín (yellow card) 88'; Michelis (yellow card) 90+1'	Stadium: Mendizorrotza; Attendance: 11,310; Referee: Iván Caparros Hernández

28 August 2022 3	Ibiza	1–1	Alavés	Ibiza
22:00 CEST (UTC+2)	Camara 10'; Morante (yellow card) 35'; Carlos (yellow card) 69'; Shashoua (yellow card) 77'; García (yellow card) 85'	Report	Abqar (yellow card) 43'; Maras (yellow card) 51'; Rioja 54'	Stadium: Can Misses; Attendance: 2,855; Referee: Luis Mario Milla Alvendiz

3 September 2022 4	Alavés	1–1	Las Palmas	Vitoria-Gasteiz
14:00 CEST (UTC+2)	Rebbach 24'	Report	Mfulu (yellow card) 44'; Suárez (yellow card) 49'; Cardona 54'	Stadium: Mendizorrotza; Attendance: 11,388; Referee: Óliver De la Fuente Ramos

10 September 2022 5	Lugo	1–2	Alavés	Lugo
14:00 CEST (UTC+2)	Chris Ramos 16'; Bruno Pirri (yellow card) 25'; El Hacen (yellow card) 73' (yellow-red card) 90+9'	Report	Sedlar (yellow card) 48'; Hara 65'; Tenaglia 68'; Sivera (yellow card) 72'; Salva Sevilla (yellow card) 73'; Jon Guridi (yellow card) 81'; Rober (yellow card) 85'; Rubén Duarte (yellow card) 90+1'; Luis Rioja (red card) 90+10'	Stadium: Estadio Anxo Carro; Attendance: 2,347; Referee: (Spain) Iosu Galech

18 September 2022 6	Alavés	2–1	Huesca	Vitoria-Gasteiz
16:15 CEST (UTC+2)	Xeber Alkain 42'; Tenaglia 52'; Rubén Duarte (yellow card) 77'	Report	Óscar Sielva 66' (yellow card) 90+3'; David Timor (yellow card) 78'	Stadium: Mendizorrotza; Attendance: 12,818; Referee: (Spain) Raúl González

26 September 2022 7	Cartagena	1–1	Alavés	Cartagena
21:00 CEST (UTC+2)	Jairo Izquierdo (yellow card) 14'; Borja Valle (yellow card) 36'; Sadiku 45+2' (pen.); Datković (yellow card) 88'	Report	de la Fuente 47'; Benavídez (yellow card) 63'	Stadium: Estadio Cartagonova; Referee: (Spain) Saúl Ais

2 October 2022 8	Alavés	3–1	Ponferradina	Vitoria-Gasteiz
16:15 CEST (UTC+2)	Luis Rioja 10'; de la Fuente 29'; Salva Sevilla (yellow card) 35'; Rubén Duarte (yellow card) 45+2'; Yuri 71' (o.g.)	Report	Paris Adot (yellow card) 22'; Dani Ojeda 45+4'; Nwakali (yellow card) 61'; Pașcanu (yellow card) 90+1'	Stadium: Mendizorrotza; Attendance: 12,209; Referee: (Spain) Mateo Busquets

8 October 2022 9	Burgos	3–0	Alavés	Burgos
21:00 CEST (UTC+2)	Gaspar Campos 53'; Pablo Valcarce (yellow card) 64'; Grego (yellow card) 72'; Miki Muñoz 81'; Aitor Córdoba (yellow card) 83'; Curro Sánchez 90+6'	Report	de la Fuente (yellow card) 16'; Benavídez (yellow card) 22'	Stadium: Estadio El Plantío; Attendance: 10,891; Referee: (Spain) Andrés Fuentes

12 October 2022 10	Alavés	0–0	Albacete	Vitoria-Gasteiz
18:30 CEST (UTC+2)	Toni Moya (yellow card) 31'; Salva Sevilla (yellow card) 45+2'; Benavídez (yellow card) 90+2'; de la Fuente (yellow card) 90+3'	Report	Álvaro Rodríguez (yellow card) 33'; Riki (yellow card) 49'; Antonio Glauder (yellow card) 64'; Higinio Marín (yellow card) 90+1'	Stadium: Mendizorrotza; Attendance: 13,890; Referee: (Spain) Francisco Hernández

15 October 2022 11	Andorra	0–1	Alavés	Andorra la Vella
16:15 CEST (UTC+2)	Sergio Molina (yellow card) 57'	Report	Rubén Duarte (yellow card) 29'; Benavídez (yellow card) 64'; Luis Rioja 75'	Stadium: Estadi Nacional; Attendance: 2,240; Referee: (Spain) David Gálvez

22 October 2022 12	Alavés	0–0	Sporting Gijón	Vitoria-Gasteiz
18:30 CEST (UTC+2)	Luis Rioja (yellow card) 16'; Benavídez (yellow card) 34'	Report	Pablo Insua (yellow card) 62'; Daniel Queipo (yellow card) 72'; Christian Rivera (yellow card) 85'	Stadium: Mendizorrotza; Attendance: 16,468; Referee: (Spain) Rubén Ávalos

29 October 2022 13	Alavés	2–1	Oviedo	Vitoria-Gasteiz
18:30 CEST (UTC+2)	Abqar 16'; Rubén Duarte (yellow card) 87'; Salva Sevilla 90+9' (pen.)	Report	Luismi (yellow card) 24'; Borja Bastón 71'; Ángel Montoro (yellow card) 90+4'; David Costas (yellow card) 90+6'	Stadium: Mendizorrotza; Attendance: 14,209; Referee: (Spain) Saúl Ais

1 November 2022 14	Racing	1–1	Alavés	Santander
18:30 CEST (UTC+2)	Iñigo Vicente (yellow card) 20'; Arturo Molina 23'; Eneko Satrústegui (yellow card) 90+2'	Report	Benavídez (yellow card) 19'; de la Fuente 40'; Abqar (yellow card) 64'; Salva Sevilla (yellow card) 72'; Xeber Alkain (red card) 90+5'	Stadium: Campos de Sport de El Sardinero; Attendance: 12,914; Referee: (Spain) Álvaro Moreno

4 November 2022 15	Alavés	1–0	Zaragoza	Vitoria-Gasteiz
21:00 CEST (UTC+2)	Benavídez (red card) 36'; Tenaglia (yellow card) 41'; Abqar (yellow card) 45+4'; Rubén Duarte (yellow card) 55'; Jason 62'	Report	Vada (yellow card) 41'; Jair Amador (yellow card) 60'	Stadium: Mendizorrotza; Attendance: 12,133; Referee: (Spain) Francisco Hernández

20 November 2022 16	Eibar	0–0	Alavés	Eibar
19:00 CEST (UTC+2)		Report	de la Fuente (yellow card) 30'	Stadium: Ipurua Municipal Stadium; Attendance: 6,517; Referee: (Spain) Dámaso Arcediano

26 November 2022 17	Alavés	2–0	Villarreal B	Vitoria-Gasteiz
16:15 CEST (UTC+2)	Jon Guridi (yellow card) 32'; Salva Sevilla 44' (pen.); Sedlar (yellow card) 55'; Benavídez 85'	Report	Diego Collado (yellow card) 62'; Dani Tasende (yellow card) 64'; Sergio Lozano (yellow card) 79'; Álex Millán (yellow card) 89'; Fall (yellow card) 89' (yellow-red card) 89'	Stadium: Mendizorrotza; Attendance: 13,403; Referee: (Spain) José Guzmán

2 December 2022 18	Granada	3–1	Alavés	Granada
21:30 CEST (UTC+2)	Uzuni 23' 31'; Petrović (yellow card) 33'; Óscar Melendo (yellow card) 50'; Jorge Molina 51'; Rubén Rochina (yellow card) 68'	Report	Xeber Alkain 11' (red card) 34'; Rubén Duarte (yellow card) 28'; Abqar (yellow card) 40'; Salva Sevilla (yellow card) 40'; Luis Rioja (yellow card) 45+6'; Tenaglia (yellow card) 65'; Hara (yellow card) 69'	Stadium: Nuevo Estadio de Los Cármenes; Attendance: 12,246; Referee: (Spain) José López

7 December 2022 19	Tenerife	2–1	Alavés	Tenerife
21:00 CEST (UTC+2)	Teto 38'; Mellot (yellow card) 44'; Enric Gallego 51' (yellow card) 90+7'; Nacho (yellow card) 84'	Report	Maraš (yellow card) 32'; Toni Moya (yellow card) 78'; Sylla 81'	Stadium: Estadio Heliodoro Rodríguez López; Attendance: 6,749; Referee: (Spain) Adrián Cordero

12 December 2022 20	Alavés	0–2	Levante	Vitoria-Gasteiz
21:00 CEST (UTC+2)	Arroyo (yellow card) 28'; Rubén Duarte (yellow card) 45+5'; Sedlar (yellow card) 61'; Sylla (red card) 90+7'	Report	Bouldini 18' (yellow card) 54'; Álex Muñoz (yellow card) 29'; Son 45+1'; Pepelu (yellow card) 48'	Stadium: Mendizorrotza; Attendance: 10,436; Referee: (Spain) Luis Milla

18 December 2022 21	Málaga	1–0	Alavés	Málaga
21:00 CEST (UTC+2)	Burgos (yellow card) 33'; Chavarría 51'; Loren Zúñiga (yellow card) 90+6'	Report	Sedlar (yellow card) 40'; Toni Moya (yellow card) 67'; Benavídez (yellow card) 75'	Stadium: La Rosaleda Stadium; Attendance: 14,813; Referee: (Spain) Daniel Trujillo

7 January 2023 22	Alavés	1–0	Burgos	Vitoria-Gasteiz
21:00 CEST (UTC+2)	Tenaglia (yellow card) 4'; Salva Sevilla (yellow card) 23'; Benavídez (yellow card) 32'; Rubén Duarte (yellow card) 50'; Rebbach 75'; Álex Balboa (yellow card) 90+4'	Report	Miguel Atienza (yellow card) 42'; Raúl Navarro (yellow card) 50'; Grego (yellow card) 68'; Curro Sánchez (yellow card) 71'; Aitor Córdoba (yellow card) 88'	Stadium: Mendizorrotza; Attendance: 19,039; Referee: (Spain) Alejandro Quintero

13 January 2023 23	Oviedo	1–0	Alavés	Oviedo
21:00 CEST (UTC+2)	Luismi (yellow card) 70'; Rodrigo Tarín 79'; Borja Bastón (yellow card) 83'	Report	Abqar (yellow card) 18' (red card) 72'; Benavídez (yellow card) 36'; Tenaglia (yellow card) 88'; Hara (yellow card) 90+6'	Stadium: Estadio Carlos Tartiere; Attendance: 12,702; Referee: (Spain) Andrés Fuentes

21 January 2023 24	Alavés	3–0	Racing	Vitoria-Gasteiz
21:00 CEST (UTC+2)	Luis Rioja 13'; Salva Sevilla 66' (pen.); Antonio Blanco (yellow card) 68'; Rober (red card) 75'; Sylla 79'	Report	Aritz Aldasoro (yellow card) 57'; Rubén González (yellow card) 83'	Stadium: Mendizorrotza; Attendance: 14,625; Referee: (Spain) Dámaso Arcediano

29 January 2023 25	Mirandés	1–3	Alavés	Miranda de Ebro
14:00 CEST (UTC+2)	Roberto López 36'; Juan Durán (yellow card) 63'	Report	Jason 41'; Abqar (yellow card) 58'; Luis Rioja 59'; Toni Moya 65'	Stadium: Estadio Municipal de Anduva; Attendance: 4,486; Referee: (Spain) Francisco Hernández

4 February 2023 26	Alavés	2–0	Eibar	Vitoria-Gasteiz
21:00 CEST (UTC+2)	Antonio Blanco (yellow card) 20'; Sylla (yellow card) 40'; Tenaglia (yellow card) 55'; Asier Villalibre 70' 90+2'; Luis Rioja (yellow card) 81'	Report	José Corpas (yellow card) 7'; Javi Muñoz (yellow card) 53'; Sergio Álvarez (red card) 57'; Peru Nolaskoain (yellow card) 90+4'; Stoichkov (yellow card) 90+4'	Stadium: Mendizorrotza; Attendance: 16,375; Referee: (Spain) José López

11 February 2023 27	Zaragoza	1–4	Alavés	Zaragoza
16:15 CEST (UTC+2)	Alejandro Francés (yellow card) 46'; Carlos Nieto (yellow card) 55'; Simeone (yellow card) 72'; Bebé 79'	Report	Abqar (yellow card) 18'; Sylla 20'; Toni Moya 53'; Sivera (yellow card) 65'; Asier Villalibre 67'; Rubén Duarte (yellow card) 89'; Luis Rioja 90'	Stadium: La Romareda; Attendance: 20,677; Referee: (Spain) Iván Caparrós

19 February 2023 28	Alavés	4–2	Ibiza	Vitoria-Gasteiz
16:15 CEST (UTC+2)	Rober (yellow card) 6'; Luis Rioja 11' 23' 36' (pen.); Abqar (yellow card) 53'; Xeber Alkain 90+5'	Report	Escobar (yellow card) 27'; Diop 41'; Martín Pascual (yellow card) 44'; Ekain Zenitagoia 51' (pen.); Iván Morante (yellow card) 82'; Grillo (red card) 85'; Mauro (red card) 90+1'	Stadium: Mendizorrotza; Attendance: 13,592; Referee: (Spain) Álvaro Moreno

25 February 2023 29	Alavés	0–0	Cartagena	Vitoria-Gasteiz
16:15 CEST (UTC+2)	Abqar (yellow card) 55'; Antonio Blanco (yellow card) 66'	Report	Datković (yellow card) 30'; Aarón Escandell (yellow card) 89'	Stadium: Mendizorrotza; Attendance: 12,703; Referee: (Spain) Víctor García

6 March 2023 30	Villarreal B	1–0	Alavés	Villarreal
21:00 CEST (UTC+2)	Pablo Íñiguez (yellow card) 12'; Alberto del Moral 30'; Dani Tasende (yellow card) 36'	Report	Laguardia (yellow card) 33'; Rubén Duarte (yellow card) 39'; Salva Sevilla (yellow card) 65'; Antonio Blanco (yellow card) 77'	Stadium: Ciudad Deportiva Villarreal CF; Attendance: 2,026; Referee: (Spain) Luis Milla

11 March 2023 31	Alavés	0–0	Lugo	Vitoria-Gasteiz
18:30 CEST (UTC+2)	Jason (yellow card) 83'; Miguel de la Fuente (yellow card) 83'; Rebbach (yellow card) 87'	Report	Gui (yellow card) 83'; Marc Carbó (yellow card) 84'; Juanpe (red card) 85'; Miguel Loureiro (yellow card) 90'	Stadium: Mendizorrotza; Attendance: 13,127; Referee: (Spain) Daniel Trujillo

18 March 2023 32	Ponferradina	1–0	Alavés	Ponferradina
21:00 CEST (UTC+2)	Nwakali (yellow card) 42'; Hugo Vallejo 66'	Report	Tenaglia (yellow card) 21'; Sedlar (yellow card) 25'; Asier Villalibre (yellow card) 37'; Antonio Blanco (yellow card) 68'	Stadium: Estadio El Toralín; Attendance: 5,675; Referee: (Spain) Rafael Sánchez

25 March 2023 33	Alavés	1–0	Tenerife	Vitoria-Gasteiz
18:30 CEST (UTC+2)	Laguardia (yellow card) 20'; Tenaglia (yellow card) 24'; Jon Guridi 69' (yellow card) 71'; Rubén Duarte (yellow card) 89'	Report	Nacho (yellow card) 28' (yellow-red card) 90+8'; Mellot (yellow card) 36'; Sergio González (yellow card) 45'; Waldo Rubio (yellow card) 52'	Stadium: Mendizorrotza; Attendance: 13,722; Referee: (Spain) Adrián Cordero

2 April 2023 34	Huesca	0-1	Alavés	Huesca
14:00 CEST (UTC+2)	Enzo Lombardo (yellow card) 53'	Report	Aleksandar Sedlar (yellow card) 56'; Salva Sevilla (yellow card) 58'; Nahuel Tenaglia 72'; Jon Guridi (yellow card) 80'	Stadium: Estadio El Alcoraz; Attendance: 5,413; Referee: Raúl González

9 April 2023 35	Alavés	0-0	Andorra	Vitoria-Gasteiz
14:00 CEST (UTC+2)	Salva Sevilla (yellow card) 42'; Miguel (yellow card) 63'; Rubén Duarte (yellow card) 75'	Report	Carlos Martínez (yellow card) 43'; Sinan Bakiş (yellow card) 65'	Stadium: Mendizorrotza; Attendance: 12,311; Referee: Saúl Ais

16 April 2023 36	Sporting Gijón	0-0	Alavés	Gijón
16:15 CEST (UTC+2)	Jonathan Varane (yellow card) 82'	Report	Javi López (yellow card) 16'; Antonio Blanco (yellow card) 28'; Salva Sevilla (yellow card) 45+2'	Stadium: El Molinón; Attendance: 18,476; Referee: Alejandro Quintero

23 April 2023 37	Alavés	2-1	Leganés	Vitoria-Gasteiz
14:00 CEST (UTC+2)	Jason (yellow card) 15'; Roberto González 40'; Roberto González (yellow card) 44'; Antonio Blanco (yellow card) 75'; Roberto González 83'	Report	Seydouba Cissé (yellow card) 37'; Jorge Miramón 54'; Gaku Shibasaki (yellow card) 58'; Kenneth Omeruo (yellow card) 70'; Yacine Qasmi (yellow card) 88'	Stadium: Mendizorrotza; Attendance: 12,218; Referee: Iosu Galech

30 April 2023 38	Levante	2-0	Alavés	Valencia
16:15 CEST (UTC+2)	José Luis García Vayá 7'; Vicente Iborra (yellow card) 29'; Wesley Moraes 32'; Joni Montiel (yellow card) 44'; Francisco Javier Hidalgo Gómez (yellow card) 82'; Charly Musonda Jr. (yellow card) 83'; Roberto Soldado (yellow card) 88'; Sergio Postigo (yellow card) 90+2'	Report	Antonio Blanco (yellow card) 34'; Jon Guridi (yellow card) 46'	Stadium: Estadi Ciutat de València; Attendance: 20,297; Referee: Mateo Busquets

7 May 2023 39	Alavés	1-1	Granada	Vitoria-Gasteiz
21:00 CEST (UTC+2)	Antonio Sivera (yellow card) 20'; Salva Sevilla (yellow card) 33'; Rubén Duarte (yellow card) 35'; Luis García (yellow card) 36'; Asier Villalibre (yellow card) 63'; Luis Rioja 66'; Rubén Duarte (yellow card) 88' (red card)	Report	Myrto Uzuni 22' (pen.); Carlos Neva (yellow card) 24'; Sergio Ruiz (yellow card) 53'; Sergio Ruiz (yellow card) 59' (red card); Antonio Puertas (yellow card) 63'; Joaquín José Marín Ruiz (yellow card) 63'; Ignasi Miquel (yellow card) 64'; Pol Lozano (yellow card) 77'	Stadium: Mendizorrotza; Attendance: 19,202; Referee: Iván Caparrós

14 May 2023 40	Albacete	1-1	Alavés	Albacete
18:30 CEST (UTC+2)	Maikel Mesa 39'; Riki Rodríguez (yellow card) 48'; Bernabé Barragán (yellow card) 65'; Antonio Cristian Glauder García (yellow card) 71'; Julio Alonso (yellow card) 80'	Report	Jason Remeseiro (yellow card) 36'; Luis Rioja (yellow card) 61'; Víctor Laguardia (yellow card) 65'; Asier Villalibre (yellow card) 80'; Carlos Benavídez (yellow card) 87'; Abderrahman Rebbach (yellow card) 90'; Higinio Marín 90+2' (o.g.)	Stadium: Estadio Carlos Belmonte; Attendance: 15,633; Referee: José López

21 May 2023 41	Alavés	2-1	Málaga	Vitoria-Gasteiz
18:30 CEST (UTC+2)	Nahuel Tenaglia (yellow card) 45+1' Asier Villalibre 46' Toni Maya (yellow card) 73' Antonio Blanco (yellow card) 82' Toni Moya 87'	Report	Alberto Escassi (yellow card) 9' Julián Delmás (yellow card) 39' Luis Muñoz (yellow card) 69' Luis Muñoz 77'	Stadium: Mendizorrotza; Attendance: 19,450; Referee: Daniel Trujillo

28 May 2023 42	Las Palmas	0-0	Alavés	Las Palmas
20:00 CEST (UTC+2)	Marvin (yellow card) 90'	Report	Antonio Blanco (yellow card) 31' Carlos Benavídez (yellow card) 42' Rubén Duarte (yellow card) 60' Luis Rioja (yellow card) 90+1' Salva Sevilla (yellow card) 90+5'	Stadium: Estadio Gran Canaria; Attendance: 31,790; Referee: Víctor García Verdura

=== Promotion Play-offs ===
3 June 2023 Semi-finals First Leg	SD Eibar	1-1	Alavés	Eibar
18:00	Juan Berrocal (yellow card) 30' Gustavo Blanco Leschuk (yellow card) 40' Juan Diego Molina Martínez 45+1' Javier Muñoz (yellow card) 48' Anaitz Arbilla (yellow card) 60' Anaitz Arbilla (yellow card) 73' (red card)	Report	Mamadou Sylla 9'	Stadium: Ipurua Municipal Stadium; Attendance: 7,300; Referee: David Gálvez

8 June 2023 Semi-finals Second Leg	Alavés	2-0 (3-1 agg.)	SD Eibar	Vitoria-Gasteiz
21:00	Abderrahman Rebbach 1' Asier Villalibre 88'	Report		Stadium: Mendizorrotza Stadium; Attendance: 19,060; Referee: Adrián Cordero

11 June 2023 Final First leg	Alavés	0-0	Levante UD	Vitoria-Gasteiz
21:00	Mamadou Sylla (yellow card) 43' Abdel Abqar (yellow card) 65' Asier Villalibre (yellow card) 89'	Report	Sergio Postigo (yellow card) 80'	Stadium: Mendizorrotza Stadium; Attendance: 19,069; Referee: Víctor García Verdura

17 June 2023 Final Second leg	Levante UD	0-1 (a.e.t.) (0-1 agg.)	Alavés	Valencia
21:00	Joni Montiel (yellow card) 90+1' José Luis García Vayá (yellow card) 97' Roberto Soldado (yellow card) 105+5' Vicente Iborra (yellow card) 105+5' Shkodran Mustafi (yellow card) 120+7'	Report	Rubén Duarte (yellow card) 20' Joaquín Panichelli (yellow card) 100' Abdel Abqar (yellow card) 112' Carlos Benavídez (yellow card) 114' Antonio Sivera (yellow card) 120+3' Asier Villalibre 120+9' (pen.)	Stadium: Estadi Ciutat de València; Attendance: 22,919; Referee: Francisco Hernández

=== Copa del Rey ===
13 November 2022 First round	Lleida Esportiu	0–1	Alavés	Lleida
18:00		Report	Hara 47'	Stadium: Camp d'Esports; Referee: José Luis Guzmán Mansilla

21 December 2022 Second round	Mérida	0–1	Alavés	Mérida
19:00		Report	Sevilla 25'	Stadium: Romano; Referee: Óliver de la Fuente Ramos

4 January 2023 Round of 32	Alavés	1–0	Valladolid	Vitoria-Gasteiz
21:00	Sylla 11'	Report		Stadium: Mendizorrotza; Attendance: 8,800; Referee: Miguel Ángel Ortiz Arias

17 January 2023 Round of 16	Alavés	0–1	Sevilla	Vitoria-Gasteiz
21:00		Report	Rakitić 48'	Stadium: Mendizorrotza; Attendance: 12,217; Referee: César Soto Grado

== Squad statistics ==
As of 4 June 2024

No.	Pos.	Nat.	Name	League				Copa Del Rey				Total			
No.	Pos.	Nat.	Name	Apps.	Goals	Yellow card	Red card	Apps.	Goals	Yellow card	Red card	Apps.	Goals	Yellow card	Red card
1	GK	(Spain)	Antonio Sivera	41	0	3	0	0	0	0	0	41	0	3	0
2	DF	(Colombia)	Anderson Arroyo	17	0	1	0	4	0	1	0	21	0	2	0
3	DF	(Spain)	Rubén Duarte	37	0	16	1	3	0	2	1	40	0	18	2
4	DF	(Serbia)	Aleksandar Sedlar	30	0	7	0	3	0	2	0	33	0	9	0
5	DF	(Spain)	Víctor Laguardia	14	0	3	0	4	0	1	0	18	0	4	0
6	MF	(Spain)	Toni Moya	39	3	4	0	3	0	0	0	42	3	4	0
7	FW	(Senegal)	Mamadou Sylla	19	4	1	1	3	1	0	0	22	5	1	1
8	MF	(Spain)	Salva Sevilla	36	3	12	0	4	1	1	0	40	4	13	0
9	FW	(Spain)	Miguel de la Fuente Escudero	33	4	5	0	1	0	0	0	34	4	5	0
10	MF	(Spain)	David Remeseiro Salgueiro	32	2	3	0	4	0	1	0	36	2	4	0
11	FW	(Spain)	Luis Rioja	38	10	6	1	4	0	1	0	42	10	7	1
12	FW	(Spain)	Asier Villalibre Molina	16	4	3	0	0	0	0	0	14	4	3	0
14	DF	(Argentina)	Nahuel Tenaglia	34	3	9	0	1	0	0	0	35	3	9	0
17	FW	(Spain)	Xeber Alkain	25	4	1	2	2	0	0	0	27	4	1	2
18	MF	(Spain)	Jon Guridi	38	1	5	0	2	0	1	0	40	1	6	0
19	DF	(Serbia)	Nikola Maraš	20	0	2	0	0	0	0	0	20	0	2	0
20	MF	(Spain)	Roberto González	28	2	3	1	4	0	1	0	32	2	4	1
21	FW	(Algeria)	Abderrahman Rebbach	19	2	2	0	3	0	0	0	22	2	2	0
22	DF	(Morocco)	Abdelkabir Abqar	35	1	10	1	1	0	0	0	36	1	10	1
23	MF	(Uruguay)	Carlos Benavídez	29	1	10	1	3	0	0	0	32	1	10	1
26	DF	(Spain)	José David Álvarez Adsuar	0	0	0	0	0	0	0	0	0	0	0	0
27	DF	(Spain)	Javi López	30	0	2	0	3	0	0	0	33	0	2	0
28	MF	(Equatorial Guinea)	Alex Balboa	11	0	1	0	4	0	1	0	15	0	2	0
29	MF	(Argentina)	Joaquín Panichelli	2	0	0	0	0	0	0	0	2	0	0	0
30	MF	(Spain)	Thomás Mendes	0	0	0	0	0	0	0	0	0	0	0	0
31	GK	(Equatorial Guinea)	Jesús Owono	1	0	0	0	4	0	1	0	5	0	0	0
33	GK	(Argentina)	Adrián Rodríguez	0	0	0	0	0	0	0	0	0	0	0	0
34	FW	(Spain)	Unai Ropero	0	0	0	0	0	0	0	0	0	0	0	0
35	FW	(Spain)	Alan Godoy	0	0	0	0	0	0	0	0	0	0	0	0
36	FW	(Spain)	Marc Tenas	0	0	0	0	0	0	0	0	0	0	0	0
37	MF	(Spain)	Antonio Blanco	17	0	10	0	1	0	0	0	18	0	10	0
38	DF	(Spain)	Adrián Pérez	0	0	0	0	0	0	0	0	0	0	0	0
40	MF	(Dominican Republic)	José de León	0	0	0	0	0	0	0	0	0	0	0	0
41	GK	(Spain)	Asier Gago	0	0	0	0	0	0	0	0	0	0	0	0
	FW	(Mauritania)	Abdallahi Mahmoud	3	0	0	0	1	0	0	0	0	0	0	0
