= 2020–21 Deportivo Alavés season =

Deportivo Alavés
2020–21 season
- President: Alfonso Fernández de Trocóniz
- Head coach: Pablo Machín (until 12 January); Abelardo (from 12 January until 5 April); Javier Calleja (from 5 April)
- Stadium: Mendizorrotza Stadium
- La Liga: 16th
- Copa del Rey: Round of 32
- Top goalscorer: League: Joselu (9); All: Joselu (9)
- Biggest win: Valladolid 0–2 Alavés; Rincón 0–2 Alavés; Elche 0–2 Alavés
- Biggest defeat: Almería 5–0 Alavés
Home colours	Away colours	Third colours

The 2020–21 season was the 100th season in the existence of Deportivo Alavés and the club's fifth consecutive season in the top flight of Spanish football. In addition to the domestic league, Alavés participated in this season's edition of the Copa del Rey. The season covered the period from 20 July 2020 to 30 June 2021, with the late start to the season due to the COVID-19 pandemic in Spain.

== Players ==
=== First-team squad ===
As of 1 February 2021

Note: Flags indicate national team as defined under FIFA eligibility rules; some limited exceptions apply. Players may hold more than one non-FIFA nationality.

No.	Pos.	Nation	Player
1	GK	ESP	Fernando Pacheco (3rd captain)
2	DF	ESP	Tachi
3	DF	ESP	Rubén Duarte
4	DF	BRA	Rodrigo Ely
5	DF	ESP	Víctor Laguardia (vice-captain)
6	MF	ARG	Rodrigo Battaglia (on loan from Sporting CP)
7	FW	ESP	Lucas Pérez
8	MF	ESP	Tomás Pina
9	FW	ESP	Joselu
10	FW	SWE	John Guidetti
11	FW	ESP	Luis Rioja
13	GK	ESP	Antonio Sivera
14	FW	BRA	Deyverson (on loan from Palmeiras)

No.	Pos.	Nation	Player
16	MF	ESP	Édgar Méndez
17	FW	ESP	Iñigo Córdoba (on loan from Athletic Bilbao)
18	MF	ESP	Burgui
19	MF	ESP	Manu García (captain)
20	MF	ESP	Pere Pons
21	DF	ESP	Martín Aguirregabiria
22	DF	FRA	Florian Lejeune (on loan from Newcastle United)
23	DF	ESP	Ximo Navarro
24	MF	ESP	Jota
26	DF	ESP	Javi López
29	MF	ESP	Borja Sainz
31	GK	ESP	Aritz Castro
37	MF	URU	Facundo Pellistri (on loan from Manchester United)

=== Under contract ===
Note: Flags indicate national team as defined under FIFA eligibility rules; some limited exceptions apply. Players may hold more than one non-FIFA nationality.

No.	Pos.	Nation	Player

=== Reserve team ===
Note: Flags indicate national team as defined under FIFA eligibility rules; some limited exceptions apply. Players may hold more than one non-FIFA nationality.

No.	Pos.	Nation	Player
27	MF	ESP	Sergi García
28	MF	ESP	Pepe Blanco

No.	Pos.	Nation	Player
30	DF	MTN	Abdallahi Mahmoud
39	DF	CMR	Stephane Paul Keller

=== Out on loan ===
Note: Flags indicate national team as defined under FIFA eligibility rules; some limited exceptions apply. Players may hold more than one non-FIFA nationality.

No.	Pos.	Nation	Player
—	DF	ESP	Carlos Isaac (at (Spain) Albacete until 30 June 2021)
—	DF	ESP	Einar Galilea (at (Croatia) Istra 1961 until 30 June 2021)
—	DF	BEN	Olivier Verdon (at (Bulgaria) Ludogorets Razgrad until 30 June 2021)
—	DF	ESP	Rafa Navarro (at (Croatia) Istra 1961 until 30 June 2021)
—	DF	ESP	Rafa Páez (at (Croatia) Istra 1961 until 30 June 2021)

No.	Pos.	Nation	Player
—	DF	ESP	Saúl García (at (Spain) Sporting Gijón until 30 June 2021)
—	MF	ESP	Antonio Perera (at (Croatia) Istra 1961 until 30 June 2022)
—	MF	ESP	Javi Muñoz (at (Spain) Mirandés until 30 June 2021)
—	MF	PAN	José Luis Rodríguez (at (Spain) Lugo until 30 June 2021)
—	FW	ARG	Ramón Miérez (at (Croatia) Osijek until 30 June 2021)

== Transfers ==
=== In ===
Date	Player	From	Type	Fee	Ref
30 June 2020	(Sweden) John Guidetti	(Germany) Hannover 96	Loan return		
30 June 2020	(Benin) Olivier Verdon	(Belgium) Eupen	Loan return		
21 July 2020	(Spain) Adrián Diéguez	Alcorcón	Loan return		
21 July 2020	(Spain) Saúl García	Rayo Vallecano	Loan return		
21 July 2020	(Argentina) Ramón Miérez	Tenerife	Loan return		
21 July 2020	(Spain) Javier Muñoz	Tenerife	Loan return		
27 July 2020	(Ghana) Patrick Twumasi	(Turkey) Gazişehir Gaziantep	Loan return		
4 August 2020	(Bosnia and Herzegovina) Ermedin Demirović	(Switzerland) St. Gallen	Loan return		
8 August 2020	(Angola) Anderson Emanuel	Fuenlabrada	Loan return		
17 August 2020	(Spain) Burgui	Zaragoza	Loan return		
17 August 2020	(Spain) Antonio Sivera	Almería	Loan return		
23 August 2020	(Brazil) Deyverson	(Brazil) Palmeiras	Loan		

=== Out ===
Date	Player	To	Type	Fee	Ref
20 July 2020	(Scotland) Oliver Burke	(England) West Bromwich Albion	Loan return		
20 July 2020	(Spain) Víctor Camarasa	Real Betis	Loan return		
20 July 2020	(Serbia) Ljubomir Fejsa	(Portugal) Benfica	Loan return		
20 July 2020	(Argentina) Lisandro Magallán	(Netherlands) Ajax	Loan return		
20 July 2020	(Spain) Roberto	(England) West Ham United	Loan return		
20 July 2020	(Spain) Aleix Vidal	Sevilla	Loan return		
4 August 2020	(Bosnia and Herzegovina) Ermedin Demirović	(Germany) Freiburg	Transfer	€3.7M	

== Pre-season and friendlies ==
Win Draw Loss

26 August 2020 Friendly	Alavés	1–2	Huesca	Vitoria-Gasteiz, Spain
19:00 CEST (UTC+2)	Joselu 5'	Report	Okazaki 8'; Mir 62'	Stadium: Ciudad Deportiva José Luis Compañón

29 August 2020 Friendly	Osasuna	2–1	Alavés	Pamplona, Spain
11:00 CEST (UTC+2)	Adrián 8'; Martínez 51'	Report	Méndez 16'	Stadium: Tajonar Facilities

2 September 2020 Friendly	Athletic Bilbao	2–1	Alavés	Lezama, Spain
11:00 CEST (UTC+2)	Muniain 29' (pen.); Morcillo 35'	Report	Deyverson 50'	Stadium: Lezama Facilities; Attendance: 0 Referee: Ekhiotz Sánchez Asla

5 September 2020 Friendly	Real Sociedad	2–2	Alavés	Zubieta, Spain
11:00 CEST (UTC+2)	Bautista 59' (pen.); Aldasoro 65'		Pérez 7'; Joselu 75'	Stadium: Campo José Luis Orbegozo; Attendance: 0

8 October 2020 Friendly	Alavés	0–0	Osasuna	Vitoria-Gasteiz, Spain
11:00 CEST (UTC+2)		Report		Stadium: Ciudad Deportiva José Luis Compañón; Attendance: 0 Referee: Aitor Barrio Salas

== Competitions ==
=== Overview ===
Competition	First match	Last match	Starting round	Final position	Record							
Competition	First match	Last match	Starting round	Final position	Pld	W	D	L	GF	GA	GD	Win %
La Liga	13 September 2020	23 May 2021	Matchday 1	16th	38	9	11	18	36	57	−21	23.68
Copa del Rey	16 December 2020	16 January 2021	First round	Round of 32	3	2	0	1	3	5	−2	66.67
Total					41	11	11	19	39	62	−23	26.83

Last updated: 23 May 2021
Source: Soccerway

=== La Liga ===
==== League table ====
Pos	Team	Pld	W	D	L	GF	GA	GD	Pts	Qualification or relegation
14	Levante	38	9	14	15	46	57	−11	41	
15	Getafe	38	9	11	18	28	43	−15	38	
16	Alavés	38	9	11	18	36	57	−21	38	
17	Elche	38	8	12	18	34	55	−21	36	
18	Huesca (R)	38	7	13	18	34	53	−19	34	Relegation to Segunda División

Source: La Liga
Rules for classification: 1) Points; 2) Head-to-head points; 3) Head-to-head goal difference; 4) Goal difference; 5) Goals scored; 6) Fair-play points (Note: Head-to-head record is used only after all the matches between the teams in question have been played)
(R) Relegated

==== Results summary ====
Overall								Home						Away					
Pld	W	D	L	GF	GA	GD	Pts	W	D	L	GF	GA	GD	W	D	L	GF	GA	GD
38	9	11	18	36	57	−21	38	6	6	7	21	25	−4	3	5	11	15	32	−17

Last updated: 23 May 2021.
Source: La Liga

==== Results by round ====
Round	1	2	3	4	5	6	7	8	9	10	11	12	13	14	15	16	17	18	19	20	21	22	23	24	25	26	27	28	29	30	31	32	33	34	35	36	37	38
Ground	H	A	H	A	H	H	A	H	A	H	A	H	A	A	H	A	H	A	H	H	A	H	A	A	H	A	H	A	H	A	H	A	H	A	H	A	H	A
Result	L	L	D	L	W	L	W	D	D	D	W	D	L	L	W	D	L	L	L	L	D	W	L	L	L	L	D	L	L	D	W	D	W	L	D	W	W	L
Position	17	19	19	20	18	18	15	14	15	15	13	12	15	17	13	13	14	16	17	18	18	16	16	16	18	19	18	19	20	19	16	16	16	16	16	15	15	16

Updated to match(es) played on 23 May 2021. Source: La Liga
A = Away; H = Home; W = Win; D = Draw; L = Loss

==== Matches ====
The league fixtures were announced on 31 August 2020.

13 September 2020 1	Alavés	0–1	Real Betis	Vitoria-Gasteiz
14:00 CEST (UTC+2)	Rioja (yellow card) 23'; López (yellow card) 69'; Pina (yellow card) 81'	Report	Emerson (yellow card) 63'; Moreno (yellow card) 72'; Iglesias (yellow card) 81'; Tello 90+5'	Stadium: Mendizorrotza; Attendance: 0 (Note: The match was played behind closed doors due to the COVID-19 pandemic in Spain.); Referee: Pablo González Fuertes

20 September 2020 2	Granada	2–1	Alavés	Granada
18:30 CEST (UTC+2)	Soldado 7'; Machís 79'	Report	Joselu 22'; Méndez (yellow card) 24'; Battaglia (yellow card) 26'; Lejeune (yellow card) 49'	Stadium: Nuevo Los Cármenes; Attendance: 0 Referee: Carlos del Cerro Grande

26 September 2020 3	Alavés	0–0	Getafe	Vitoria-Gasteiz
13:00 CEST (UTC+2)	Battaglia (yellow card) 65'; Lejeune (yellow card) 74'	Report	Djené (yellow card) 59'; Suárez (yellow card) 83'	Stadium: Mendizorrotza; Attendance: 0 Referee: Javier Alberola Rojas

30 September 2020 4	Villarreal	3–1	Alavés	Villarreal
19:00 CEST (UTC+2)	Alcácer 13', 67'; Gerard 45' (pen.)	Report	Méndez 36'; Laguardia (yellow card) 74'; Navarro (yellow card) 82'	Stadium: Estadio de la Cerámica; Attendance: 0 Referee: David Medié Jiménez

4 October 2020 5	Alavés	1–0	Athletic Bilbao	Vitoria-Gasteiz
14:00 CEST (UTC+2)	Ely 74'; Duarte (yellow card) 85' (yellow-red card) 86'	Report	D. García (yellow card) 19'; Núñez (yellow card) 62'; Martínez (yellow card) 64'	Stadium: Mendizorrotza; Attendance: 0 Referee: José María Sánchez Martínez

18 October 2020 6	Alavés	0–2	Elche	Vitoria-Gasteiz
18:30 CEST (UTC+2)	Lejeune (yellow card) 30'; Ely (yellow card) 67'	Report	Marcone (yellow card) 26'; Calvo (yellow card) 33'; Milla 39'; Morente (yellow card) 47', (goal) 86'; Josan (yellow card) 61'; Rigoni (yellow card) 78'	Stadium: Mendizorrotza; Attendance: 0 Referee: Adrián Cordero Vega

25 October 2020 7	Valladolid	0–2	Alavés	Valladolid
14:00 CET (UTC+1)	Nacho (red card) 21'; Toni (yellow card) 43'	Report	Pérez (penalty missed) 22'; Pina 55'; Sainz 85'	Stadium: Estadio José Zorrilla; Attendance: 0 Referee: José Luis Munuera Montero

31 October 2020 8	Alavés	1–1	Barcelona	Vitoria-Gasteiz
21:00 CET (UTC+1)	Jota (yellow card) 15' (yellow-red card) 62'; Deyverson (yellow card) 22'; Rioja 31'; Duarte (yellow card) 87'	Report	Messi (yellow card) 39'; Lenglet (yellow card) 44'; Busquets (yellow card) 44'; Griezmann 63'	Stadium: Mendizorrotza; Attendance: 0 Referee: Alejandro Hernández Hernández

8 November 2020 9	Levante	1–1	Alavés	Valencia
18:30 CET (UTC+1)	Morales 51'; Clerc (yellow card) 90+4'	Report	Pérez 4'; Pina (yellow card) 10'; Méndez (yellow card) 24' (yellow-red card) 34'; Battaglia (yellow card) 78'; Rioja (yellow card) 81'; Pacheco (yellow card) 83'	Stadium: Ciutat de València; Attendance: 0 Referee: Isidro Díaz de Mera Escuderos

22 November 2020 10	Alavés	2–2	Valencia	Vitoria-Gasteiz
21:00 CET (UTC+1)	Navarro 2'; Pérez 16' (pen.); Lejeune (yellow card) 37'	Report	Guillamón (yellow card) 53', (goal) 77'; Vallejo 72'	Stadium: Mendizorrotza; Attendance: 0 Referee: Santiago Jaime Latre

28 November 2020 11	Real Madrid	1–2	Alavés	Madrid
21:00 CET (UTC+1)	Casemiro (yellow card) 18', (goal) 86'; Kroos (yellow card) 61'	Report	Pérez 5' (pen.); Joselu 49'; Rioja (yellow card) 67'; Duarte (yellow card) 76'; Méndez (yellow card) 88'	Stadium: Alfredo Di Stéfano; Attendance: 0 Referee: Adrián Cordero Vega

6 December 2020 12	Alavés	0–0	Real Sociedad	Vitoria-Gasteiz
21:00 CET (UTC+1)	Lejeune (yellow card) 42'; Battaglia (red card) 61'	Report		Stadium: Mendizorrotza; Attendance: 0 Referee: José Luis Munuera Montero

12 December 2020 13	Huesca	1–0	Alavés	Huesca
18:30 CET (UTC+1)	Ontiveros (yellow card) 58', (goal) 66'	Report	Duarte (yellow card) 37'; Jota (yellow card) 52'; Tachi (yellow card) 70'; Joselu (yellow card) 83'	Stadium: Estadio El Alcoraz; Attendance: 0 Referee: Mario Melero López

20 December 2020 14	Celta Vigo	2–0	Alavés	Vigo
14:00 CET (UTC+1)	Méndez 19', 79'; Araujo (yellow card) 55'; Nolito (yellow card) 61'	Report	Battaglia (yellow card) 20'; Pina (yellow card) 35'	Stadium: Balaídos; Attendance: 0 Referee: Javier Alberola Rojas

23 December 2020 15	Alavés	2–1	Eibar	Vitoria-Gasteiz
22:00 CET (UTC+1)	Méndez (yellow card) 38', (goal) 41'; Deyverson 45+2'; Battaglia (yellow card) 56'; Pina (yellow card) 62'; Laguardia (yellow card) 89'	Report	León 4'; Gil (yellow card) 81'; Arietaleanizbeaskoa (yellow card) 88'	Stadium: Mendizorrotza; Attendance: 0 Referee: Carlos del Cerro Grande

31 December 2020 16	Osasuna	1–1	Alavés	Pamplona
16:15 CET (UTC+1)	Rubén (red card) 8'; Calleri (yellow card) 41'; Herrera (yellow card) 64'; Torres 67'; Oier (yellow card) 73'	Report	Pina (yellow card) 37'; Deyverson (yellow card) 40'; Lejeune (yellow card) 55'; Pérez 75' (pen.); Jota (yellow card) 82'	Stadium: El Sadar; Attendance: 0 Referee: Santiago Jaime Latre

3 January 2021 17	Alavés	1–2	Atlético Madrid	Vitoria-Gasteiz
16:15 CET (UTC+1)	Laguardia (red card) 63'; Felipe 84' (o.g.)	Report	Carrasco (yellow card) 29'; Llorente 41'; Suárez 90', (yellow card) 90+4'	Stadium: Mendizorrotza; Attendance: 0 Referee: Juan Martínez Munuera

10 January 2021 18	Cádiz	3–1	Alavés	Cádiz
16:15 CET (UTC+1)	Álex 15'; Fali (yellow card) 22'; Lozano 56'; Negredo 68'	Report	Joselu 23' (pen.); Pina (yellow card) 40'; Deyverson (yellow card) 44'; Tachi (yellow card) 45+2' (yellow-red card) 50'	Stadium: Ramón de Carranza; Attendance: 0 Referee: José María Sánchez Martínez

19 January 2021 19	Alavés	1–2	Sevilla	Vitoria-Gasteiz
21:30 CET (UTC+1)	Méndez 12', (yellow card) 56'; Lejeune (yellow card) 48'; Pons (yellow card) 72'; Joselu (penalty missed) 90+1'	Report	En-Nesyri 3', (yellow card) 81'; Suso 30'; Bono (yellow card) 89'; Navas (yellow card) 90'	Stadium: Mendizorrotza; Attendance: 0 Referee: Isidro Díaz de Mera Escuderos

23 January 2021 20	Alavés	1–4	Real Madrid	Vitoria-Gasteiz
21:00 CET (UTC+1)	Navarro (yellow card) 10'; García (yellow card) 49'; Joselu 59'; Laguardia (yellow card) 79'; Sainz (yellow card) 85'; Méndez (yellow card) 90+2'	Report	Casemiro 15'; Benzema 41', 70', (yellow card) 87'; Hazard 45+1'; Militão (yellow card) 59'; Mendy (yellow card) 86'	Stadium: Mendizorrotza; Attendance: 0 Referee: Alejandro Hernández Hernández

31 January 2021 21	Getafe	0–0	Alavés	Getafe
14:00 CET (UTC+1)	Arambarri (yellow card) 9'; Suárez (yellow card) 78'; Yáñez (yellow card) 83'	Report	Lejeune (yellow card) 24'; García (yellow card) 57'; Navarro (yellow card) 90+3'	Stadium: Coliseum Alfonso Pérez; Attendance: 0 Referee: Santiago Jaime Latre

5 February 2021 22	Alavés	1–0	Valladolid	Vitoria-Gasteiz
21:00 CET (UTC+1)	Pina (yellow card) 10'; Navarro (yellow card) 40'; García (yellow card) 63'; Joselu 66'; Méndez (yellow card) 90+2'	Report	Bruno (yellow card) 43'; Joaquín (yellow card) 48'; San Emeterio (yellow card) 82'; Alcaraz (yellow card) 88'	Stadium: Mendizorrotza; Attendance: 0 Referee: César Soto Grado

13 February 2021 23	Barcelona	5–1	Alavés	Barcelona
21:00 CET (UTC+1)	Trincão 29', 74'; Messi 45+1', 75'; Firpo 80'	Report	Aguirregabiria (yellow card) 17'; Tachi (yellow card) 53'; Rioja 57'	Stadium: Camp Nou; Attendance: 0 Referee: Jorge Figueroa Vázquez

21 February 2021 24	Real Sociedad	4–0	Alavés	San Sebastián
16:15 CET (UTC+1)	Isak 41', 49', 62'; Merino (yellow card) 51'; Illarramendi (yellow card) 54'; Portu 73'; Bautista (yellow card) 85'	Report	García (yellow card) 52'; Pina (yellow card) 61'	Stadium: Anoeta; Attendance: 0 Referee: José Luis Munuera Montero

27 February 2021 25	Alavés	0–1	Osasuna	Vitoria-Gasteiz
18:30 CET (UTC+1)	Pina (yellow card) 44'; Laguardia (yellow card) 68'; Pérez (yellow card) 82'	Report	U. García (yellow card) 30'; Vidal (yellow card) 40'; D. García (yellow card) 65'; Cruz (yellow card) 73'; Barja 77'	Stadium: Mendizorrotza; Attendance: 0 Referee: José María Sánchez Martínez

8 March 2021 26	Real Betis	3–2	Alavés	Seville
21:00 CET (UTC+1)	Iglesias 61' (pen.), 88'; Joaquín 81'	Report	Joselu 12'; Méndez (yellow card) 23', (goal) 24'; Battaglia (yellow card) 31'; Navarro (yellow card) 77'	Stadium: Benito Villamarín; Attendance: 0 Referee: Javier Alberola Rojas

13 March 2021 27	Alavés	1–1	Cádiz	Vitoria-Gasteiz
14:00 CET (UTC+1)	Joselu 36' (pen.); Pina (yellow card) 70'; García (yellow card) 80' (yellow-red card) 81'	Report	Salvi (yellow card) 34'; Fali (yellow card) 74'; Álex 84' (pen.); Šaponjić (yellow card) 90+2'	Stadium: Mendizorrotza; Attendance: 0 Referee: Isidro Díaz de Mera Escuderos

21 March 2021 28	Atlético Madrid	1–0	Alavés	Madrid
18:30 CET (UTC+1)	Suárez 54'; Carrasco (yellow card) 76'; Savić (yellow card) 85'; Saúl (yellow card) 90+2'	Report	Jota (yellow card) 33'; Joselu (penalty missed) 86'; Battaglia (yellow card) 88'	Stadium: Wanda Metropolitano; Attendance: 0 Referee: Juan Martínez Munuera

4 April 2021 29	Alavés	1–3	Celta Vigo	Vitoria-Gasteiz
14:00 CEST (UTC+2)	Laguardia (yellow card) 20'; Lejeune (yellow card) 52', (goal) 86'; Navarro (yellow card) 65'; Méndez (yellow card) 85'	Report	Murillo (yellow card) 2' (yellow-red card) 54'; Nolito 8'; Aspas 14'; Mina 20'; Aidoo (yellow card) 24'; Kevin (yellow card) 86'; Tapia (yellow card) 89'; Mallo (yellow card) 90+4'	Stadium: Mendizorrotza; Attendance: 0 Referee: Antonio Mateu Lahoz

10 April 2021 30	Athletic Bilbao	0–0	Alavés	Bilbao
16:15 CEST (UTC+2)	Vesga (yellow card) 2'; Capa (yellow card) 90+1'	Report	Lejeune (yellow card) 46'; García (yellow card) 90+2'	Stadium: San Mamés; Attendance: 0 Referee: Mario Melero López

18 April 2021 33	Alavés	1–0	Huesca	Vitoria-Gasteiz
16:15 CEST (UTC+2)	Battaglia (yellow card) 60', (goal) 85'	Report	Vavro (yellow card) 30'; Escriche (yellow card) 84'	Stadium: Mendizorrotza; Attendance: 0 Referee: Alejandro Hernández Hernández
Note: The match was originally scheduled for 28 April 2021, but was brought forward by La Liga.

21 April 2021 31	Alavés	2–1	Villarreal	Vitoria-Gasteiz
21:00 CEST (UTC+2)	Joselu 17'; García (yellow card) 69'; Méndez (yellow card) 74', (goal) 80'	Report	Alcácer 50'; Pedraza (yellow card) 63'	Stadium: Mendizorrotza; Attendance: 0 Referee: Adrián Cordero Vega

24 April 2021 32	Valencia	1–1	Alavés	Valencia
18:30 CEST (UTC+2)	Gayà (yellow card) 4', (goal) 89'; Guillamón (yellow card) 37'; Vallejo (yellow card) 81'; Soler (yellow card) 83'	Report	Guidetti 84'; López (red card) 87'	Stadium: Mestalla; Attendance: 0 Referee: Guillermo Cuadra Fernández

1 May 2021 34	Eibar	3–0	Alavés	Eibar
14:00 CEST (UTC+2)	Kike 3', 50', 59'	Report	Pina (yellow card) 44'; Battaglia (yellow card) 57'	Stadium: Ipurua; Attendance: 0 Referee: José Luis Munuera Montero

8 May 2021 35	Alavés	2–2	Levante	Vitoria-Gasteiz
14:00 CEST (UTC+2)	Pons 30'; Rioja (yellow card) 44'; Battaglia (yellow card) 79'; Joselu 87'	Report	Morales 36', 42'; Cantero (yellow card) 51'	Stadium: Mendizorrotza; Attendance: 0 Referee: Carlos del Cerro Grande

11 May 2021 36	Elche	0–2	Alavés	Elche
20:00 CEST (UTC+2)	Mfulu (yellow card) 13'; Gazzaniga (yellow card) 90+3'	Report	Méndez (yellow card) 2'; Joselu 40'; Rioja 54'; Tachi (yellow card) 67'; Pina (yellow card) 85'; Deyverson (yellow card) 90+3'	Stadium: Martínez Valero; Attendance: 0 Referee: Pablo González Fuertes

16 May 2021 37	Alavés	4–2	Granada	Vitoria-Gasteiz
18:30 CEST (UTC+2)	Pons 8'; R. Duarte 21'; Joselu 66'; Rioja 72'; Guidetti (yellow card) 90+3'; García (yellow card) 90+3'	Report	Pérez (yellow card) 20'; Eteki (yellow card) 30'; Molina 31'; D. Duarte (yellow card) 45'; Quini (yellow card) 47'; Puertas 63'	Stadium: Mendizorrotza; Attendance: 0 Referee: José María Sánchez Martínez

23 May 2021 38	Sevilla	1–0	Alavés	Seville
21:00 CEST (UTC+2)	Vidal (yellow card) 29'; Gómez 90+2'	Report		Stadium: Ramón Sánchez Pizjuán; Attendance: 0 Referee: Isidro Díaz De Mera Escuderos

=== Copa del Rey ===
16 December 2020 First round	Rincón	0–2	Alavés	Málaga (Note: Rincón did not play its game in its main stadium Francisco Romero, in Rincón de la Victoria, as it does not meet the requirements to broadcast the match.)
21:00 CET (UTC+1)		Report	Guidetti 32', 59'	Stadium: La Rosaleda; Referee: Juan Martínez Munuera

6 January 2021 Second round	Deportivo La Coruña	0–1	Alavés	A Coruña
19:00 CET (UTC+1)	Mosquera (yellow card) 48'	Report	Marín (yellow card) 31'; Rioja 75'	Stadium: Riazor; Referee: Pablo González Fuertes

16 January 2021 Round of 32	Almería	5–0	Alavés	Almería
12:00 CET (UTC+1)	Sadiq 8', 45+1', (yellow card) 70'; Costa (yellow card) 37'; Corpas (yellow card) 42'; Aketxe 45'; Battaglia 52' (o.g.); Villar 81' (pen.)	Report	Pina (red card) 35'	Stadium: Estadio de los Juegos Mediterráneos; Referee: Javier Alberola Rojas

== Statistics ==
=== Appearances and goals ===
Last updated on 23 May 2021.

No.	Pos	Nat	Player	Total		La Liga		Copa del Rey	
No.	Pos	Nat	Player	Apps	Goals	Apps	Goals	Apps	Goals
Goalkeepers
1	GK	(Spain) ESP	Fernando Pacheco	38	0	37+1	0	0	0
13	GK	(Spain) ESP	Antonio Sivera	4	0	1	0	3	0
Defenders
2	DF	(Spain) ESP	Tachi	14	0	8+4	0	2	0
3	DF	(Spain) ESP	Rubén Duarte	31	1	29+2	1	0	0
4	DF	(Brazil) BRA	Rodrigo Ely	8	1	6+2	1	0	0
5	DF	(Spain) ESP	Víctor Laguardia	34	0	30+2	0	2	0
21	DF	(Spain) ESP	Martín Aguirregabiria	29	0	16+10	0	3	0
22	DF	(France) FRA	Florian Lejeune	36	1	34	1	1+1	0
23	DF	(Spain) ESP	Ximo Navarro	32	1	28+3	1	1	0
26	DF	(Spain) ESP	Javi López	11	0	1+8	0	2	0
27	DF	(Spain) ESP	Sergi García	3	0	0+2	0	0+1	0
30	DF	(Mauritania) MTN	Abdallahi Mahmoud	2	0	1+1	0	0	0
39	DF	(Cameroon) CMR	Stephane Paul Keller	1	0	0+1	0	0	0
Midfielders
6	MF	(Argentina) ARG	Rodrigo Battaglia	35	1	29+3	1	1+2	0
8	MF	(Spain) ESP	Tomás Pina	35	1	31+2	1	2	0
16	MF	(Spain) ESP	Édgar Méndez	36	5	26+7	5	1+2	0
18	MF	(Spain) ESP	Burgui	3	0	0+1	0	0+2	0
19	MF	(Spain) ESP	Manu García	27	0	10+15	0	1+1	0
20	MF	(Spain) ESP	Pere Pons	23	2	12+10	2	1	0
24	MF	(Spain) ESP	Jota	25	0	18+5	0	1+1	0
29	MF	(Spain) ESP	Borja Sainz	24	1	2+19	1	2+1	0
37	MF	(Uruguay) URU	Facundo Pellistri	12	0	5+7	0	0	0
Forwards
7	FW	(Spain) ESP	Lucas Pérez	28	4	19+9	4	0	0
9	FW	(Spain) ESP	Joselu	38	11	34+3	11	1	0
10	FW	(Sweden) SWE	John Guidetti	13	3	1+9	1	3	2
11	FW	(Spain) ESP	Luis Rioja	36	5	25+10	4	1	1
14	FW	(Brazil) BRA	Deyverson	25	1	11+12	1	1+1	0
17	FW	(Spain) ESP	Iñigo Córdoba	7	0	3+4	0	0	0
Players who have left the club during the season
15	MF	(Spain) ESP	Javier Muñoz	0	0	0	0	0	0
17	DF	(Spain) ESP	Adrián Marín	8	0	1+4	0	2+1	0
37	DF	(Portugal) POR	Tomás Tavares	5	0	0+3	0	2	0

=== Goalscorers ===
As of 31 December 2020

Rank	No.	Pos	Nat	Name	La Liga	Copa del Rey	Total
1	7	FW	(Spain)	Lucas Pérez	4	0	4
2	9	FW	(Spain)	Joselu	2	0	2
2	10	FW	(Sweden)	John Guidetti	0	2	2
2	16	MF	(Spain)	Édgar Méndez	2	0	2
5	4	DF	(Brazil)	Rodrigo Ely	1	0	1
5	23	DF	(Spain)	Ximo Navarro	1	0	1
5	8	MF	(Spain)	Tomás Pina	1	0	1
5	29	MF	(Spain)	Borja Sainz	1	0	1
5	11	FW	(Spain)	Luis Rioja	1	0	1
5	14	FW	(Brazil)	Deyverson	1	0	1
Totals					14	2	16
