= Javi López (footballer, born 2002) =

Spanish footballer (born 2002)

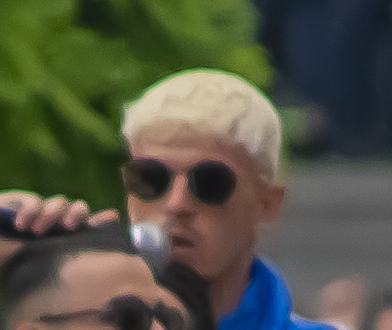
- López in 2023

Personal information
- Full name: Javier López Carballo
- Date of birth: 25 March 2002 (age 24)
- Place of birth: La Orotava, Spain
- Height: 1.83 m (6 ft 0 in)
- Position: Left-back

Team information
- Current team: Feyenoord (on loan from Real Sociedad)
- Number: 16

Youth career
- Orotava
- Tenerife
- 2017–2019: Alavés

Senior career*
Years	Team	Apps	(Gls)
2018–2020	Alavés B	17	(0)
2020–2024	Alavés	83	(1)
2024–	Real Sociedad	29	(0)
2025–2026	→ Oviedo (loan)	25	(0)
2026–	→ Feyenoord (loan)	8	(1)

International career^{‡}
2018	Spain U16		
2018–2020	Spain U17	20	(0)
2020	Spain U18	1	(0)
2024	Spain U21	5	(0)
- * Club domestic league appearances and goals as of 31 October 2026 ‡ National team caps and goals as of 03:45, 21 November 2024 (UTC)

Javier "Javi" López Carballo (born 25 March 2002) is a Spanish professional footballer who plays as a left-back for Eredivisie club Feyenoord, on loan from La Liga club Real Sociedad.

== Club career ==
=== Alavés ===
Born in La Orotava, Santa Cruz de Tenerife, Canary Islands, López represented UD Orotava and CD Tenerife before joining Deportivo Alavés' youth setup in 2017. The following March, he renewed his contract until 2020.

López made his senior debut with the reserves on 22 September 2018 at the age of just 16, by starting in a 0–0 Tercera División home draw against Real Sociedad C. In March of the following year, he further extended his contract until 2023, being definitely promoted to the main squad ahead of the 2020–21 campaign.

On 21 June 2020, aged 18, López made his first team – and La Liga – debut, starting in a 0–6 away loss against RC Celta de Vigo. A backup to Rubén Duarte, he suffered relegation in 2022 before achieving promotion in the following year.

López scored his first professional goal on 5 May 2024, netting the winner in a 1–0 away success over Valencia CF.

=== Real Sociedad ===
On 21 July 2024, López signed a six-year deal with Real Sociedad also in the top tier.

==== Loan to Oviedo ====
On 31 August 2025, López was loaned to Real Oviedo in the first division, for one year.

==== Loan to Feyenoord ====
on 17 August 2026, López was loaned to Eredivisie club Feyenoord with an option to buy.

== Career statistics ==
=== Club ===
As of match played 3 November 2026

Appearances and goals by club, season and competition
Club	Season	League			Copa del Rey		Europe		Total	
Club	Season	Division	Apps	Goals	Apps	Goals	Apps	Goals	Apps	Goals
Alavés B	2018–19	Tercera División	1	0	—		—		1	0
Alavés B	2019–20	Segunda División B	16	0	—		—		16	0
Alavés B	Total		17	0	0	0	0	0	17	0
Alavés	2019–20	La Liga	1	0	0	0	—		1	0
Alavés	2020–21	La Liga	9	0	2	0	—		11	0
Alavés	2021–22	La Liga	9	0	2	0	—		11	0
Alavés	2022–23	La Liga	32	0	3	0	—		35	0
Alavés	2023–24	La Liga	32	1	2	0	—		34	1
Alavés	Total		83	1	9	0	0	0	92	1
Real Sociedad	2024–25	La Liga	29	0	3	0	6 (Note: Appearances in UEFA Europa League)	0	38	0
Real Sociedad	2026–27	La Liga	0	0	0	0	0	0	0	0
Real Sociedad	Total		29	0	3	0	6	0	38	0
Oviedo (loan)	2025–26	La Liga	25	0	1	0	—		26	0
Feyenoord (loan)	2026–27	Eredivisie	8	1	0	0	4 (Note: Appearances in UEFA Champions League)	0	12	1
Career total			162	2	13	0	10	0	185	2
