= Eneko Ortiz =

Spanish footballer

Personal information
- Full name: Eneko Ortiz Díaz
- Date of birth: 23 May 2003 (age 23)
- Place of birth: Miranda de Ebro, Spain
- Position: Left-back

Team information
- Current team: Villarreal B
- Number: 3

Youth career
- Mirandés
- 2019–2022: Alavés

Senior career*
Years	Team	Apps	(Gls)
2022–2025	Alavés B	83	(2)
2023–2025	Alavés	1	(0)
2025–	Villarreal B	34	(0)
- * Club domestic league appearances and goals as of 25 May 2026

Eneko Ortiz Díaz (born 26 May 2003) is a Spanish professional footballer who plays as a left-back for Villarreal CF B.

== Career ==
Born in Miranda de Ebro, Burgos, Castile and León, Ortiz joined Deportivo Alavés' youth sides from hometown side CD Mirandés in 2019. On 11 April 2022, while still a youth, he renewed his contract with the club until 2025.

Ortiz made his senior debut with the reserves on 30 April 2022, coming on as a late substitute for Stephane Keller in a 2–2 Tercera División RFEF away draw against Urduliz FT, as his side was already promoted. Definitely promoted to the B-side ahead of the 2022–23 Segunda Federación, he scored his first senior goal on 12 February 2023, netting the fourth in a 4–0 away routing of CD Arnedo.

Ortiz made his first team – and La Liga – debut on 26 May 2024, replacing fellow youth graduate Javi López in a 1–1 away draw against UD Las Palmas. On 23 June of the following year, he moved to another reserve team, Villarreal CF B in Primera Federación.
