= Antonio Blanco (footballer) =

Spanish footballer (born 2000)

Personal information
- Full name: Antonio Blanco Conde
- Date of birth: 23 July 2000 (age 26)
- Place of birth: Montalbán de Córdoba, Spain
- Height: 1.76 m (5 ft 9 in)
- Position: Defensive midfielder

Team information
- Current team: Alavés
- Number: 8

Youth career
- 2007–2010: Montalbán
- 2010–2013: Séneca
- 2013–2019: Real Madrid

Senior career*
Years	Team	Apps	(Gls)
2019–2022	Real Madrid B	64	(2)
2021–2023	Real Madrid	5	(0)
2022–2023	→ Cádiz (loan)	3	(0)
2023	→ Alavés (loan)	17	(0)
2023–	Alavés	104	(2)

International career^{‡}
2016–2017	Spain U17	20	(2)
2018–2019	Spain U19	13	(2)
2021–2023	Spain U21	13	(1)
2021	Spain	1	(0)
Medal record
Representing Spain
UEFA European Under-21 Championship
Runner-up	2023 Georgia–Romania	Team
UEFA European Under-19 Championship
Winner	2019 Armenia	Team
FIFA U-17 World Cup
Runner-up	2017 India	Team
UEFA European Under-17 Championship
Winner	2017 Croatia	Team
- * Club domestic league appearances and goals as of 27 May 2026 ‡ National team caps and goals as of 8 June 2021

Antonio Blanco Conde (born 23 July 2000) is a Spanish professional footballer who plays mainly as a defensive midfielder for La Liga club Alavés, and the Spain national team. Blanco was included in The Guardian's "Next Generation 2017".

== Club career ==
=== Real Madrid ===
Blanco made his La Liga debut for Real Madrid on 18 April 2021, in a goalless draw against Getafe, coming on as a substitute. He was handed his first start three days later, in a 3–0 win over Cádiz.

==== Loans to Cádiz and Alavés ====
In August 2022, he moved to Cádiz on a season-long loan deal. Blanco was recalled in January 2023 and joined Segunda División club Alavés until the end of the season.

=== Alavés ===
On 25 July 2023, Blanco signed for Alavés permanently until June 2027.

== International career ==
Due to the isolation of some national team players following the positive COVID-19 test of Sergio Busquets, Spain's under-21 squad were called up for the international friendly against Lithuania on 8 June 2021. Blanco made his senior debut in the match as Spain won 4–0.

== Career statistics ==
=== Club ===
As of match played 2 January 2024

Appearances and goals by club, season and competition
Club	Season	League			Cup		Continental		Other		Total	
Club	Season	Division	Apps	Goals	Apps	Goals	Apps	Goals	Apps	Goals	Apps	Goals
Real Madrid Castilla	2019–20	Segunda División B	23	1	—		—		—		23	1
Real Madrid Castilla	2020–21	Segunda División B	19	0	—		—		0	0	19	0
Real Madrid Castilla	2021–22	Primera División RFEF	22	1	—		—		—		22	1
Real Madrid Castilla	Total		64	2	—		—		0	0	64	2
Real Madrid	2020–21	La Liga	4	0	0	0	0	0	0	0	4	0
Real Madrid	2021–22	La Liga	1	0	0	0	1	0	0	0	2	0
Real Madrid	Total		5	0	0	0	1	0	0	0	6	0
Cádiz (loan)	2022–23	La Liga	3	0	1	0	—		—		4	0
Alavés (loan)	2022–23	Segunda División	18	0	1	0	—		—		19	0
Alavés	2023–24	La Liga	17	0	1	0	—		—		18	0
Career total	Total		107	2	3	0	1	0	0	0	111	2

=== International ===
As of 8 June 2021

Appearances and goals by national team and year
National team	Year	Apps	Goals
Spain	2021	1	0
Total		1	0

== Honours ==
Real Madrid

- La Liga: 2021–22
- UEFA Champions League: 2021–22

Spain U17

- UEFA European Under-17 Championship: 2017
- FIFA Under-17 World Cup runner-up: 2017

Spain U19

- UEFA European Under-19 Championship: 2019

Spain U21

- UEFA European Under-21 Championship runner-up: 2023

Individual

- UEFA European Under-19 Championship Team of the Tournament: 2019
- UEFA European Under-21 Championship Team of the Tournament: 2023
