= Tachi (footballer) =

Spanish footballer (born 1997)

Personal information
- Full name: Alberto Rodríguez Baró
- Date of birth: 10 September 1997 (age 29)
- Place of birth: Fuenlabrada, Spain
- Height: 1.84 m (6 ft 0 in)
- Position: Centre-back

Team information
- Current team: Zaragoza
- Number: 5

Youth career
- Getafe
- 2013–2016: Atlético Madrid

Senior career*
Years	Team	Apps	(Gls)
2016–2019	Atlético Madrid B	88	(4)
2019–2022	Alavés	23	(0)
2022	→ Fuenlabrada (loan)	11	(0)
2023	Wisła Kraków	15	(1)
2023–2025	Mirandés	56	(0)
2025–	Zaragoza	12	(1)
- * Club domestic league appearances and goals as of 9 June 2026

Alberto Rodríguez Baró (born 10 September 1997), commonly known as Tachi, is a Spanish professional footballer who plays as a central defender for Real Zaragoza.

== Club career ==
Born in Fuenlabrada, Madrid, Tachi joined Atlético Madrid's youth setup in 2013, from Getafe CF. Promoted to the reserves ahead of the 2016–17 season, he made his senior debut on 28 August 2016 by starting in a 1–0 Tercera División away win against Fútbol Alcobendas Sport.

Tachi scored his senior goal on 7 May 2017, netting the opener in a 3–1 away defeat of AD Parla. He contributed with 33 appearances during his first campaign, as his side achieved promotion to Segunda División B.

On 19 July 2019, after being a regular starter for Atleti's B-side, Tachi signed a four-year contract with La Liga side Deportivo Alavés. He made his professional debut on 18 August, coming on as a late substitute for fellow debutant Luis Rioja in a 1–0 home defeat of Levante UD.

On 26 January 2022, after featuring rarely, Tachi moved to hometown side CF Fuenlabrada on loan for the remainder of the 2021–22 Segunda División season. On 31 August, he terminated his contract with the Babazorros.

After staying unemployed throughout the rest of 2022, on 20 January 2023 Tachi joined Polish I liga side Wisła Kraków on a deal until June 2024. On 3 August, he left the club by mutual consent, and signed a one-year deal with CD Mirandés back in his home country's second division the following day.

On 9 July 2025, free agent Tachi agreed to a two-year contract with Real Zaragoza also in division two.

== Career statistics ==
=== Club ===
As of match played 21 February 2021

Appearances and goals by club, season and competition
Club	Season	League			National Cup		Continental		Other		Total	
Club	Season	Division	Apps	Goals	Apps	Goals	Apps	Goals	Apps	Goals	Apps	Goals
Atlético Madrid B	2016–17	Tercera División	31	1	—		—		2 (Note: Appearance(s) in Promotion Playoffs)	0	33	1
Atlético Madrid B	2017–18	Segunda División B	24	0	—		—		—		24	0
Atlético Madrid B	2018–19	Segunda División B	33	3	—		—		2	0	35	3
Atlético Madrid B	Total		88	4	0	0	0	0	4	0	92	4
Atlético Madrid	2018–19	La Liga	0	0	0	0	0	0	—		0	0
Alavés	2019–20	La Liga	6	0	1	0	—		—		7	0
Alavés	2020–21	La Liga	8	0	2	0	—		—		10	0
Alavés	Total		14	0	3	0	0	0	0	0	17	0
Career total			102	4	3	0	0	0	4	0	109	0
