= Andoni Gorosabel =

Spanish footballer (born 1996)

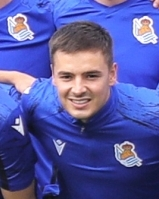
- Gorosabel with Real Sociedad in 2021

Personal information
- Full name: Andoni Gorosabel Espinosa
- Date of birth: 4 August 1996 (age 30)
- Place of birth: Arrasate, Spain
- Height: 1.74 m (5 ft 9 in)
- Position: Right-back

Team information
- Current team: Espanyol (on loan from Athletic Bilbao)

Youth career
- –2010: Aretxabaleta
- 2010–2014: Real Sociedad

Senior career*
Years	Team	Apps	(Gls)
2014–2017	Real Sociedad C	34	(1)
2014–2015	→ Beasain (loan)	33	(1)
2016–2017	→ Real Unión (loan)	29	(1)
2017–2018	Real Sociedad B	23	(1)
2017–2023	Real Sociedad	114	(0)
2023–2024	Alavés	37	(1)
2024–	Athletic Bilbao	44	(0)
2026–	→ Espanyol (loan)	0	(0)

International career^{‡}
2024–	Basque Country	1	(0)
- * Club domestic league appearances and goals as of 27 May 2026 ‡ National team caps and goals as of 24 March 2024

Andoni Gorosabel Espinosa (born 4 August 1996) is a Spanish professional footballer who plays as a right-back for La Liga club RCD Espanyol, on loan from Athletic Bilbao.

== Club career ==
=== Real Sociedad ===
Born in Arrasate, Gipuzkoa, Basque Country, Gorosabel represented UD Aretxabaleta and Real Sociedad as a youth, appearing in the UEFA Youth League in 2013. On 11 July 2014, after finishing his formation, he was loaned to SD Beasain in Tercera División, making his senior debut during the season.

Upon returning, Gorosabel was assigned to farm team Berio FT, also in the fourth tier. On 9 July 2016, he was loaned to Segunda División B side Real Unión for one year.

On 16 June 2017, Gorosabel renewed his Real Sociedad contract until 2019 and was promoted to the reserves, also competing in the third level. He made his first team – and La Liga – debut on 21 September, starting in a 3–0 away loss against Levante UD.

On 5 December 2017, Gorosabel renewed his contract until 2021, and spent the remainder of the campaign as a second-choice to Álvaro Odriozola, overtaking longtime incumbent Carlos Martínez. In July 2018, as both Odriozola and Martínez left, he was definitely promoted to the main squad.

In March 2022, he reached the milestone of 100 appearances for Real Sociedad.

=== Alavés ===
On 11 August 2023, Gorosabel signed a one-year deal with Deportivo Alavés, newly-promoted to the top tier. A regular starter for the club, he scored his first professional goal on 10 March 2024, netting the winner in a 1–0 home success over Rayo Vallecano.

=== Athletic Bilbao ===
On 19 June 2024, Athletic Bilbao announced the signing of Gorosabel on a four-year contract. On 1 September 2026, he was loaned to fellow top tier side RCD Espanyol, with an obligatory buyout clause on certain conditions.

== International career ==
Gorosabel was called up to the Basque Country national team for a friendly match against Palestine on 15 November 2025.

== Career statistics ==
=== Club ===
As of match played 23 May 2026

Appearances and goals by club, season and competition
Club	Season	League			National cup		Europe		Other		Total	
Club	Season	Division	Apps	Goals	Apps	Goals	Apps	Goals	Apps	Goals	Apps	Goals
Real Unión (loan)	2016–17	Segunda División B	29	1	—		—		—		29	1
Real Sociedad B	2017–18	Segunda División B	23	1	—		—		2 (Note: Appearances in Segunda División B play-offs)	0	25	1
Real Sociedad	2017–18	La Liga	2	0	1	0	2 (Note: Appearances in UEFA Europa League)	0	—		5	0
Real Sociedad	2018–19	La Liga	7	0	0	0	—		—		7	0
Real Sociedad	2019–20	La Liga	14	0	5 (Note: Includes appearance in 2020 Copa del Rey final (played in 2021))	0	—		—		19	0
Real Sociedad	2020–21	La Liga	32	0	1	0	6	0	1 (Note: Appearance in Supercopa de España)	0	40	0
Real Sociedad	2021–22	La Liga	32	0	2	0	6	0	—		40	0
Real Sociedad	2022–23	La Liga	27	0	3	0	5	0	—		35	0
Real Sociedad	Total		114	0	12	0	19	0	1	0	146	0
Alavés	2023–24	La Liga	36	1	1	0	—		—		37	1
Athletic Bilbao	2024–25	La Liga	20	0	1	0	9	0	0	0	30	0
Athletic Bilbao	2025–26	La Liga	24	0	3	0	7 (Note: Appearances in UEFA Champions League)	0	0	0	34	0
Athletic Bilbao	Total		44	0	4	0	16	0	0	0	64	0
Career total			246	3	17	0	35	0	3	0	301	3

== Honours ==
Real Sociedad

- Copa del Rey: 2019–20
