= Abdallahi Mahmoud =

Mauritanian footballer

Personal information
- Full name: Abdallahi Mohamed Mahmoud
- Date of birth: 4 May 2000 (age 26)
- Place of birth: Dar-Naim, Mauritania
- Height: 1.87 m (6 ft 2 in)
- Positions: Centre back; midfielder

Team information
- Current team: Al-Arabi

Youth career
- FC Nouadhibou

Senior career*
Years	Team	Apps	(Gls)
2017–2018	FC Nouadhibou		
2018–2023	Alavés B	38	(2)
2020–2024	Alavés	8	(0)
2021–2022	→ Istra 1961 (loan)	24	(3)
2023	→ Istra 1961 (loan)	18	(1)
2023–2024	→ Bellinzona (loan)	21	(1)
2024–	Al-Arabi	0	(0)

International career^{‡}
2018	Mauritania U20		
2018–	Mauritania	40	(2)
- * Club domestic league appearances and goals as of 5 September 2024 ‡ National team caps and goals as of 13 August 2025 (UTC)

Abdallahi Mohamed Mahmoud (born 4 May 2000) is a Mauritanian professional footballer who plays as either a central defender or a midfielder for Kuwaiti club Al-Arabi and the Mauritania national team.

== Club career ==
Born in Dar-Naim, Mahmoud started his career with FC Nouadhibou, first playing for their main squad in 2017. On 8 August 2018, after impressing with the under-20 national team in the L'Alcúdia International Football Tournament, he signed for La Liga side Deportivo Alavés, being initially assigned to the youth setup.

Midway through the 2018–19 season, Mahmoud started to appear with the reserves in Tercera División, and contributed with one goal in 12 appearances (play-offs included) as his side achieved promotion to Segunda División B. On 11 May 2020, he was one of the five B-team players called up to train with the main squad for the remainder of the campaign after the COVID-19 pandemic.

Mahmoud made his first team – and La Liga – debut on 27 June 2020, starting in a 1–2 loss at Atlético Madrid. On 18 August of the following year, moved on loan to Croatian club NK Istra 1961, for one year.

On 8 September 2023, Mahmoud moved to Swiss Challenge League side AC Bellinzona on loan for the 2023–24 season.

In September 2024, Mahmoud signed for Kuwait Premier League club Al-Arabi.

== International career ==
After representing Mauritania at under-20 level in the 2018 COTIF tournament, Mahmoud was first called up for the full side on 27 August 2018, for a 2019 Africa Cup of Nations qualification match against Burkina Faso. He made his international debut on 8 September, coming on as a late substitute for Abdoulaye Gaye in the 2–0 win.

== Career statistics ==
=== Club ===
As of 5 January 2023

Appearances and goals by club, season and competition
Club	Season	League			National Cup		Other		Total	
Club	Season	Division	Apps	Goals	Apps	Goals	Apps	Goals	Apps	Goals
Alavés B	2018–19	Tercera División	8	1	—		4 (Note: Appearances in the promotion play-offs.)	0	12	1
Alavés B	2019–20	Segunda División B	20	1	—		—		20	1
Alavés B	2020–21	Segunda División B	9	0	—		—		9	0
Alavés B	2022–23	Segunda Federación	1	0	—		—		1	0
Alavés B	Total		38	2	0	0	4	0	42	2
Alavés	2019–20	La Liga	3	0	0	0	—		3	0
Alavés	2020–21	La Liga	2	0	0	0	—		2	0
Alavés	2022–23	Segunda División	3	0	1	0	—		4	0
Alavés	Total		8	0	1	0	0	0	9	0
Istra 1961 (loan)	2021–22	Prva liga	24	3	3	0	—		27	3
Istra 1961 (loan)	2022–23	Prva liga	0	0	0	0	—		0	0
Career total			70	5	4	0	4	0	78	5

=== International ===
As of 22 March 2025

Appearances and goals by national team and year
National team	Year	Apps	Goals
Mauritania	2018	1	0
Mauritania	2019	2	0
Mauritania	2020	3	0
Mauritania	2021	9	0
Mauritania	2022	8	1
Mauritania	2023	6	0
Mauritania	2024	8	0
Mauritania	2025	1	1
Total		38	2

==== International goals ====
Scores and results list Mauritania's goal tally first, score column indicates score after each Mahmoud goal.

List of international goals scored by Thievy Bifouma
No.	Date	Venue	Opponent	Score	Result	Competition
1	4 June 2022	Stade Cheikha Ould Boïdiya, Nouakchott, Mauritania	Sudan	3–0	3–0	2023 Africa Cup of Nations qualification
2	22 March 2025	Stade de Kégué, Lomé, Togo	Togo	2–1	2–2	2026 FIFA World Cup qualification
