= Luis Rioja =

Spanish footballer (born 1993)

Personal information
- Full name: Luis Jesús Rioja González
- Date of birth: 16 October 1993 (age 33)
- Place of birth: Las Cabezas de San Juan, Spain
- Height: 1.76 m (5 ft 9 in)
- Position: Winger

Team information
- Current team: Valencia
- Number: 11

Youth career
- 1999–2012: Cabecense

Senior career*
| Years | Team | Apps | (Gls) |
| 2012–2013 | Cabecense | 35 | (4) |
| 2013–2014 | Real Madrid C | 33 | (0) |
| 2014–2017 | Celta B | 65 | (8) |
| 2017–2018 | Marbella | 46 | (5) |
| 2018–2019 | Almería | 39 | (4) |
| 2019–2024 | Alavés | 180 | (21) |
| 2024– | Valencia | 73 | (8) |
- * Club domestic league appearances and goals as of 27 May 2026

Luis Jesús Rioja González (born 16 October 1993) is a Spanish professional footballer who plays as a left winger and left back for Valencia CF.

== Career ==
Rioja was born in Las Cabezas de San Juan, Seville, Andalusia, and was a CD Cabecense youth graduate. He made his senior debut on 2 September 2012, playing the last 22 minutes of a 2–0 Tercera División home win against Cádiz CF B.

Rioja scored his first senior goal on 18 November 2012, in a 4–0 home routing of Arcos CF, and finished the campaign with four goals in 35 appearances. On 27 June of the following year, he signed a three-year deal with Real Madrid and was assigned to the C-team in Segunda División B.

On 27 July 2014, Rioja joined another reserve team, Celta de Vigo B in the third division. On 4 January 2017, he moved to fellow league team Marbella FC.

On 23 July 2018, Rioja agreed to a two-year contract with Segunda División side UD Almería. He made his professional debut on 17 August, starting in a 1–0 away loss against Cádiz CF.

Rioja scored his first professional goal on 26 August 2018, netting the opener in a 1–1 home draw against CD Tenerife. He was a regular starter for the club during the campaign, contributing four goals in 39 appearances.

On 1 July 2019, Rioja signed a four-year deal with La Liga side Deportivo Alavés, as the club activated his release clause. He made his debut in the league on 18 August, starting in a 1–0 home defeat of Levante UD.

On 22 August 2024, Rioja signed a two-year contract with Valencia CF.

== Career statistics ==
As of match played 17 June 2023

Appearances and goals by club, season and competition
| Club | Season | League | | | National cup | | Other | | Total | |
| Club | Season | Division | Apps | Goals | Apps | Goals | Apps | Goals | Apps | Goals |
|---|---|---|---|---|---|---|---|---|---|---|
| Cabecense | 2012–13 | Tercera División | 35 | 4 | — | | — | | 35 | 4 |
| Real Madrid C | 2013–14 | Segunda División B | 33 | 0 | — | | — | | 33 | 0 |
| Celta B | 2014–15 | Segunda División B | 28 | 4 | — | | — | | 28 | 4 |
| Celta B | 2015–16 | Segunda División B | 37 | 4 | — | | — | | 37 | 4 |
| Celta B | 2016–17 | Segunda División B | 0 | 0 | — | | — | | 0 | 0 |
| Celta B | Total | | 65 | 8 | 0 | 0 | 0 | 0 | 65 | 8 |
| Marbella | 2016–17 | Segunda División B | 16 | 0 | — | | — | | 16 | 0 |
| Marbella | 2017–18 | Segunda División B | 30 | 5 | 2 | 0 | 2 (Note: Appearance(s) in Promotion Playoff) | 0 | 34 | 5 |
| Marbella | Total | | 46 | 5 | 2 | 0 | 2 | 0 | 50 | 5 |
| Almería | 2018–19 | Segunda División | 39 | 4 | 2 | 1 | — | | 41 | 5 |
| Alavés | 2019–20 | La Liga | 28 | 0 | 1 | 0 | — | | 29 | 0 |
| Alavés | 2020–21 | La Liga | 35 | 4 | 1 | 1 | — | | 36 | 5 |
| Alavés | 2021–22 | La Liga | 37 | 1 | 2 | 1 | — | | 39 | 2 |
| Alavés | 2022–23 | Segunda División | 38 | 10 | 3 | 0 | 4 | 0 | 45 | 10 |
| Alavés | 2023–24 | La Liga | 37 | 5 | 2 | 0 | 0 | 0 | 39 | 5 |
| Alavés | 2024–25 | La Liga | 1 | 0 | 0 | 0 | — | | 1 | 0 |
| Alavés | Total | | 176 | 20 | 9 | 2 | 4 | 0 | 189 | 22 |
| Career total | | | 394 | 41 | 13 | 3 | 6 | 0 | 413 | 44 |

== Honours ==
Alavés

- Segunda División play-offs: 2023

Individual

- Segunda División Player of the Month: February 2023
