= Rubén Duarte =

Spanish footballer (born 1995)

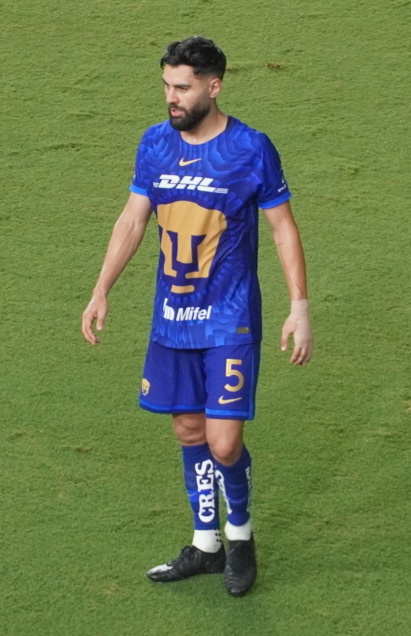
- Duarte with Pumas in 2025

Personal information
- Full name: Rubén Duarte Sánchez
- Date of birth: 18 October 1995 (age 31)
- Place of birth: Almería, Spain
- Height: 1.78 m (5 ft 10 in)
- Position: Defender

Team information
- Current team: Pumas
- Number: 5

Youth career
- Los Molinos
- 2008–2009: Poli Ejido
- 2009–2012: Espanyol

Senior career*
Years	Team	Apps	(Gls)
2012–2015	Espanyol B	72	(1)
2015–2017	Espanyol	3	(0)
2017–2024	Alavés	218	(3)
2024–	Pumas	76	(3)

International career
2011	Spain U16	4	(1)
2012	Spain U17	2	(1)
2013	Spain U18	2	(0)
2013–2014	Spain U19	10	(0)
2015–2016	Spain U21	9	(0)
- * Club domestic league appearances and goals as of 20:24, 24 October 2026 (UTC)

Rubén Duarte Sánchez (born 18 October 1995) is a Spanish professional footballer who plays for Liga MX club Pumas. Mainly a left-back, he can also play as a central defender.

He made his La Liga debut with Espanyol, and spent most of his career with Alavés, totalling 231 appearances in seven seasons.

== Club career ==
=== Espanyol ===
Born in Almería, Andalusia, Duarte joined RCD Espanyol's youth system in 2009, aged 13, after spells at Los Molinos CF and Polideportivo Ejido. In 2012, he was linked to Manchester City, and made his senior debut with the reserves in the Segunda División B.

On 7 January 2015, Duarte made his first-team debut, playing the full 90 minutes in a 2–1 away loss against Valencia CF in the round of 16 of the Copa del Rey. His maiden La Liga appearance occurred on 8 February, against the same opponent and with the same scoreline, but at the Estadi Cornellà-El Prat.

Duarte renewed his contract with the Catalan club on 11 June 2015, signing until 2019 and being promoted to the main squad.

=== Alavés ===
On 29 May 2017, after falling down the pecking order, Duarte signed a three-year deal at Deportivo Alavés in the same league. He played 24 matches in his first season, in a 14th-place finish.

Duarte scored his first goal in the Spanish top division – and as a professional – on 16 May 2021, in a 4–2 home win over Granada CF. In July 2023, after helping to another promotion to the main tier, he renewed his contract until 2026.

On 9 July 2024, Duarte became a free agent.

=== Pumas ===
Hours after leaving Alavés, Duarte moved abroad for the first time in his career, being announced at Liga MX side Pumas UNAM. He scored his first goal on 10 August 2025, through a header in the 1–1 home draw with Club Necaxa.

== International career ==
After playing for Spain at under-16, under-17, under-18, under-19 and under-21 levels, Duarte was first called to the full side on 26 May 2015 for a friendly with Costa Rica and a UEFA Euro 2016 qualifying match against Belarus.

== Career statistics ==
As of match played on 26 May 2024

Appearances and goals by club, season and competition
Club	Season	League			National Cup		Other		Total	
Club	Season	Division	Apps	Goals	Apps	Goals	Apps	Goals	Apps	Goals
Espanyol B	2012–13	Segunda División B	21	0	—		—		21	0
Espanyol B	2013–14	Segunda División B	32	1	—		—		32	1
Espanyol B	2014–15	Segunda División B	19	0	—		—		19	0
Espanyol B	Total		72	1	0	0	0	0	72	1
Espanyol	2014–15	La Liga	11	0	4	0	—		15	0
Espanyol	2015–16	La Liga	22	0	3	0	—		25	0
Espanyol	2016–17	La Liga	3	0	2	0	—		5	0
Espanyol	Total		36	0	9	0	0	0	45	0
Alavés	2017–18	La Liga	24	0	2	0	—		26	0
Alavés	2018–19	La Liga	33	0	0	0	—		33	0
Alavés	2019–20	La Liga	31	0	0	0	—		31	0
Alavés	2020–21	La Liga	31	1	0	0	—		31	1
Alavés	2021–22	La Liga	34	0	0	0	0	0	34	0
Alavés	2022–23	Segunda División	37	2	3	0	4	0	44	2
Alavés	2023–24	La Liga	28	2	4	1	0	0	32	3
Alavés	Total		218	5	9	1	4	0	231	6
Career total			326	6	18	1	4	0	348	7
