= Egoitz Muñoz =

Spanish footballer (born 2004)

Personal information
- Full name: Egoitz Muñoz Larrea
- Date of birth: 14 April 2004 (age 22)
- Place of birth: Vitoria-Gasteiz, Spain
- Height: 1.79 m (5 ft 10 in)
- Position: Right-back

Team information
- Current team: Córdoba (on loan from Alavés)
- Number: 27

Youth career
- 2016–2023: Alavés

Senior career*
Years	Team	Apps	(Gls)
2023–2026	Alavés B	89	(8)
2024–	Alavés	0	(0)
2026–	→ Córdoba (loan)	1	(0)
- * Club domestic league appearances and goals as of 16 August 2026

Egoitz Muñoz Larrea (born 14 April 2004) is a Spanish footballer who plays as a right-back for Córdoba CF, on loan from Deportivo Alavés.

== Career ==
Muñoz was born in Vitoria-Gasteiz, Álava, Basque Country, and represented Deportivo Alavés as a youth, having joined the side in the Infantil squad. Promoted to the reserves ahead of the 2023–24 season in Segunda Federación, he made his senior debut on 10 September 2023, starting in a 1–0 home win over Real Sociedad C.

Muñoz quickly established himself as a starter for the B-team, before making his first team debut on 29 October 2024, starting in a 1–0 away win over SD Compostela, for the campaign's Copa del Rey. The following 22 July, he renewed his contract with the Babazorros until 2027.

On 19 June 2026, Muñoz was loaned to Segunda División side Córdoba CF, for one year. He made his professional debut on 16 August, starting in a 3–2 away loss to Burgos CF.

== Personal life ==
Muñoz's grandfather Luis Ramón Larrea was also a footballer. A midfielder, he also played for Alavés in the 1970s.
