= Carlos Protesoni =

Uruguayan footballer (born 1998)

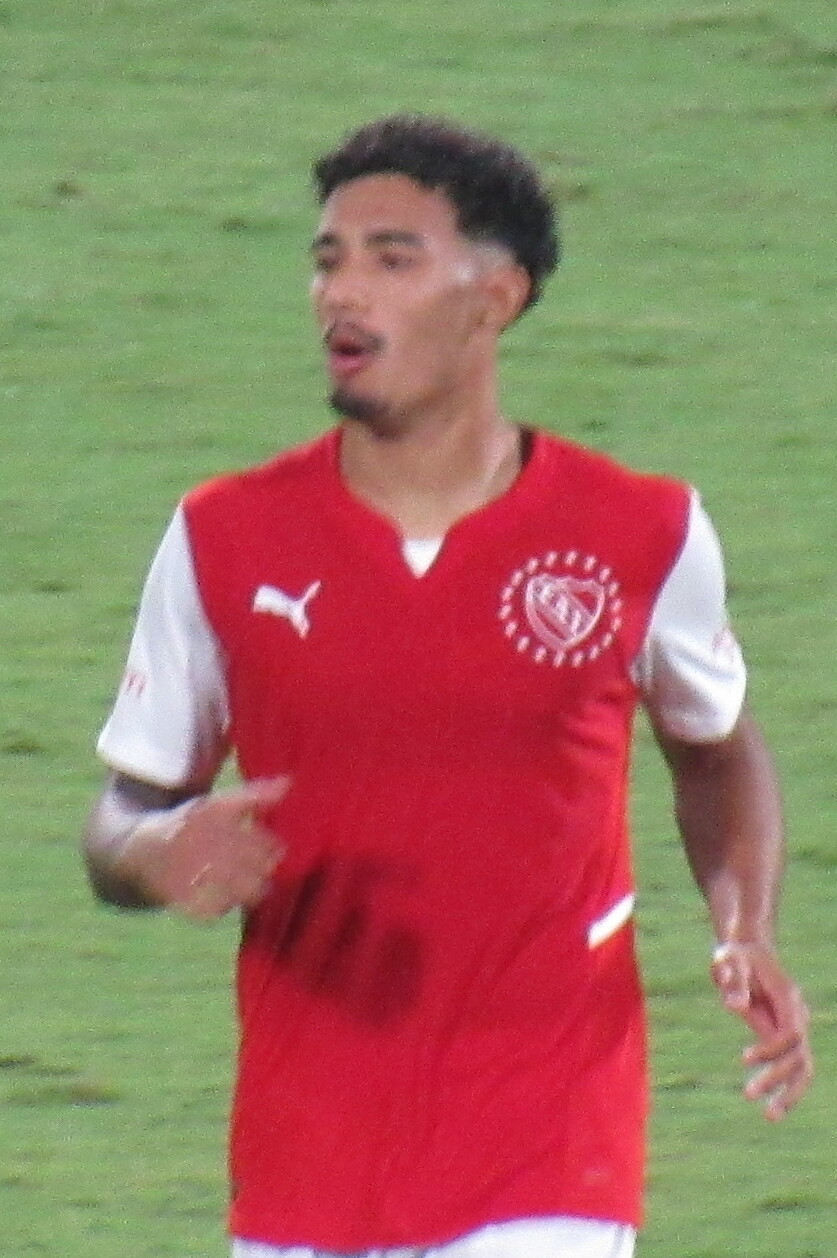
- Protesoni in 2022

Personal information
- Full name: Carlos Nahuel Benavídez Protesoni
- Date of birth: 30 March 1998 (age 28)
- Place of birth: Montevideo, Uruguay
- Height: 1.85 m (6 ft 1 in)
- Position: Central midfielder

Team information
- Current team: Alavés
- Number: 23

Youth career
- Defensor Sporting

Senior career*
Years	Team	Apps	(Gls)
2016–2018	Defensor Sporting	52	(2)
2018–2022	Independiente	26	(3)
2022–	Alavés	89	(5)

International career^{‡}
2016–2017	Uruguay U20	29	(4)
2020	Uruguay U23	5	(0)
Medal record
Men's football
Representing Uruguay
South American U-20 Championship
Winner	2017 Ecuador
- * Club domestic league appearances and goals as of 27 May 2026 ‡ National team caps and goals as of 25 January 2020

Carlos Nahuel Benavídez Protesoni (born 30 March 1998) is a Uruguayan professional footballer who plays as central midfielder for La Liga club Deportivo Alavés.

== Club career ==
Born in Montevideo, Protesoni began his career with hometown side Defensor Sporting, making his first team debut in 2016 at the age of 18. He became a regular starter in 2017, and moved to Argentine Primera División side Independiente.

On 1 July 2022, Protesoni signed a two-year contract with Spanish side Deportivo Alavés of the Segunda División.

== Personal life ==
Originally playing under the name Carlos Benavídez, he opted to play under his maternal surname Protesoni in August 2024 to honour his mother who raised him by herself. Through his mother, he is of Italian descent and holds dual Uruguayan-Italian citizenship.
