= Jon Guridi =

Spanish footballer (born 1995)

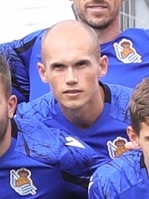
- Guridi with Real Sociedad in 2021

Personal information
- Full name: Jon Guridi Aldalur
- Date of birth: 28 February 1995 (age 31)
- Place of birth: Azpeitia, Spain
- Height: 1.79 m (5 ft 11 in)
- Positions: Midfielder; right wing-back

Team information
- Current team: Sevilla
- Number: 18

Youth career
- Real Sociedad

Senior career*
Years	Team	Apps	(Gls)
2014–2019	Real Sociedad B	82	(8)
2017–2022	Real Sociedad	30	(1)
2019–2020	→ Mirandés (loan)	48	(5)
2022–2026	Alavés	135	(7)
2026–	Sevilla	0	(0)

International career^{‡}
2025–	Basque Country	1	(0)
- * Club domestic league appearances and goals as of 27 May 2026 ‡ National team caps and goals as of 15 November 2025

Jon Guridi Aldalur (born 28 February 1995) is a Spanish professional footballer who plays for La Liga club Sevilla. Often deployed as a midfielder, he can also play as a right-back or right wing-back.

== Career ==
=== Real Sociedad ===
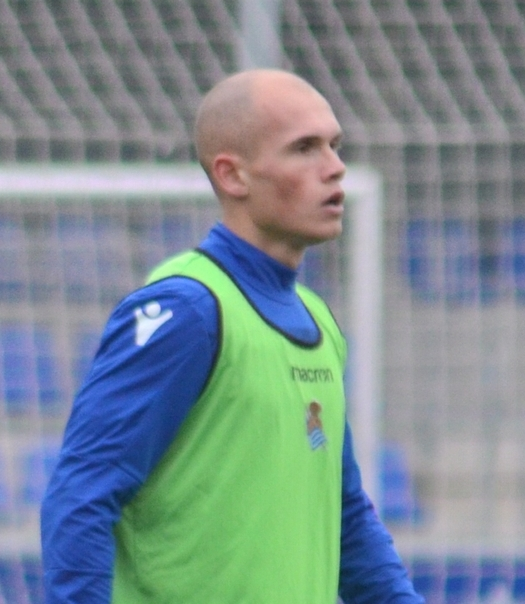
Guridi training with Real Sociedad in 2018

Born in Azpeitia, Gipuzkoa, Basque Country, Guridi was a Real Sociedad youth graduate. On 11 July 2014 he was promoted to the reserve team in Segunda División B, and made his senior debut on 13 September by starting in a 3–2 away loss against Sestao River.

Guridi scored his first professional goal on 10 October 2015, netting a last-minute equalizer in a 1–1 home draw against the same opponent. The following 10 February, he renewed his contract until 2018.

Guridi made his first team – and La Liga – debut on 18 March 2017, starting in a 1–0 away loss against local rivals Deportivo Alavés. Ahead of the 2017–18 season, he was definitely promoted to the main squad.

Guridi scored his first professional goal on 3 November 2019, netting his team's first in a 4–2 loss at Elche CF, and was a regular starter as Mirandés avoided relegation.

==== Loan to Mirandés ====
In January 2019, Guridi was loaned to CD Mirandés, achieving promotion from the third division at the end of the season. His loan was extended for the entire 2019–20 campaign.

==== Return from loan ====
Upon returning from loan, Guridi was assigned to the main squad in the top tier, and scored his first goal in the category on 22 May 2022, netting his team's only in a 2–1 home loss against Atlético Madrid.

=== Alavés ===
On 11 July 2022, free agent Guridi signed a four-year contract with Deportivo Alavés, recently relegated to the second division. An undispued starter, he helped the club return to the top tier at first attempt.

=== Sevilla ===
On 10 June 2026, Sevilla FC announced the signing of Guridi on a two-year deal.

== International career ==
Guridi was called up to the Basque Country national team for a friendly match against Palestine on 15 November 2025.

== Career statistics ==
As of match played 22 May 2022

Appearances and goals by club, season and competition
Club	Season	League			National Cup		Continental		Other		Total	
Club	Season	Division	Apps	Goals	Apps	Goals	Apps	Goals	Apps	Goals	Apps	Goals
Real Sociedad B	2014–15	Segunda División B	11	0	—		—		—		11	0
Real Sociedad B	2015–16	Segunda División B	34	3	—		—		—		34	3
Real Sociedad B	2016–17	Segunda División B	28	3	—		—		—		28	3
Real Sociedad B	2018–19	Segunda División B	9	2	—		—		—		9	2
Real Sociedad B	Total		82	8	0	0	0	0	0	0	82	8
Real Sociedad	2016–17	La Liga	1	0	0	0	—		—		1	0
Real Sociedad	2017–18	La Liga	4	0	0	0	0	0	—		4	0
Real Sociedad	2020–21	La Liga	17	0	2	0	2 (Note: Appearance(s) in UEFA Europa League)	0	1 (Note: Appearance(s) in Supercopa de España)	0	22	0
Real Sociedad	2021–22	La Liga	8	1	1	1	0	0	—		9	2
Real Sociedad	Total		30	1	3	1	2	0	1	0	36	2
Mirandés (loan)	2018–19	Segunda División B	12	2	0	0	—		6 (Note: Appearance(s) in Segunda División B play-offs)	0	18	2
Mirandés (loan)	2019–20	Segunda División	36	3	5	0	—		—		41	3
Mirandés (loan)	Total		48	5	5	0	0	0	6	0	59	5
Career total			160	14	8	1	2	0	7	0	177	15
