= Toni Moya =

Spanish footballer

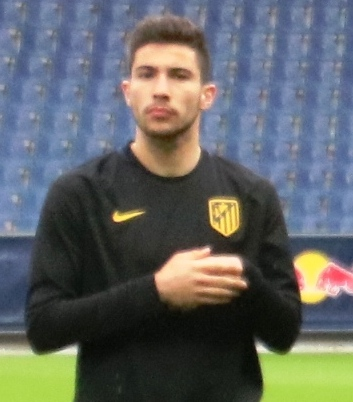
- Moya in 2017

Personal information
- Full name: Antonio Moya Vega
- Date of birth: 20 March 1998 (age 28)
- Place of birth: Mérida, Spain
- Height: 1.85 m (6 ft 1 in)
- Position: Central midfielder

Youth career
- Serverense
- Manacor
- Mallorca
- 2013–2018: Atlético Madrid

Senior career*
Years	Team	Apps	(Gls)
2016–2021	Atlético Madrid B	109	(12)
2018–2021	Atlético Madrid	3	(0)
2021–2023	Alavés	67	(3)
2023–2026	Zaragoza	97	(2)

International career
2014	Spain U16	2	(0)
2015	Spain U17	6	(0)
2016	Spain U19	2	(0)
- * Club domestic league appearances and goals as of 31 May 2026

Antonio "Toni" Moya Vega (born 20 March 1998) is a Spanish professional footballer who plays for Thai League 1 club Buriram United as a central midfielder.

== Career ==
Born in Mérida, Badajoz, Extremadura, but raised in Son Servera, Majorca, Balearic Islands, Moya joined Atlético Madrid's youth setup in 2013 at the age of 15, from RCD Mallorca. He made his senior debut with the reserves on 16 October 2016, starting in a 2–0 Tercera División home win against Internacional de Madrid CF.

Moya scored his first senior goal on 18 December 2016, netting his team's second in a 3–2 away win against Villaverde San Andrés. He contributed with 19 appearances during the campaign, as his side returned to Segunda División B after a two-year absence.

Moya made his first team debut on 25 October 2017, coming on as a second-half substitute for Keidi Bare in a 1–1 away draw against Elche CF, for the season's Copa del Rey. His La Liga debut came the following 1 April, replacing Thomas Partey in a 1–0 home win against Deportivo de La Coruña.

On 1 June 2021, Moya signed a two-year contract with Deportivo Alavés in the top tier. He scored his first professional goal on 29 January 2023, netting his team's third in a 3–1 Segunda División away win over CD Mirandés.

On 6 July 2023, free agent Moya agreed to a two-year deal with Real Zaragoza in division two.

== Career statistics ==
=== Club ===
As of 30 July 2021

Appearances and goals by club, season and competition
Club	Season	League			National Cup		Continental		Other		Total	
Club	Season	Division	Apps	Goals	Apps	Goals	Apps	Goals	Apps	Goals	Apps	Goals
Atlético Madrid B	2016–17	Tercera División	18	1	—		—		1 (Note: Appearance(s) in Promotion Playoffs)	0	19	1
Atlético Madrid B	2017–18	Segunda División B	28	5	—		—		—		28	5
Atlético Madrid B	2018–19	Segunda División B	26	1	—		—		2	0	28	1
Atlético Madrid B	2019–20	Segunda División B	18	2	—		—		1	0	19	2
Atlético Madrid B	2020–21	Segunda División B	19	3	—		—		—		19	3
Atlético Madrid B	Total		109	12	0	0	0	0	4	0	113	12
Atlético Madrid	2017–18	La Liga	1	0	1	0	0	0	—		2	0
Atlético Madrid	2018–19	La Liga	1	0	1	0	0	0	—		2	0
Atlético Madrid	2019–20	La Liga	1	0	0	0	0	0	—		1	0
Atlético Madrid	2020–21	La Liga	0	0	0	0	0	0	—		0	0
Atlético Madrid	Total		3	0	2	0	0	0	0	0	5	0
Alavés	2021–22	La Liga	0	0	0	0	—		—		0	0
Career total			112	12	2	0	0	0	4	0	118	2
