= Abdel Abqar =

Moroccan footballer (born 1999)

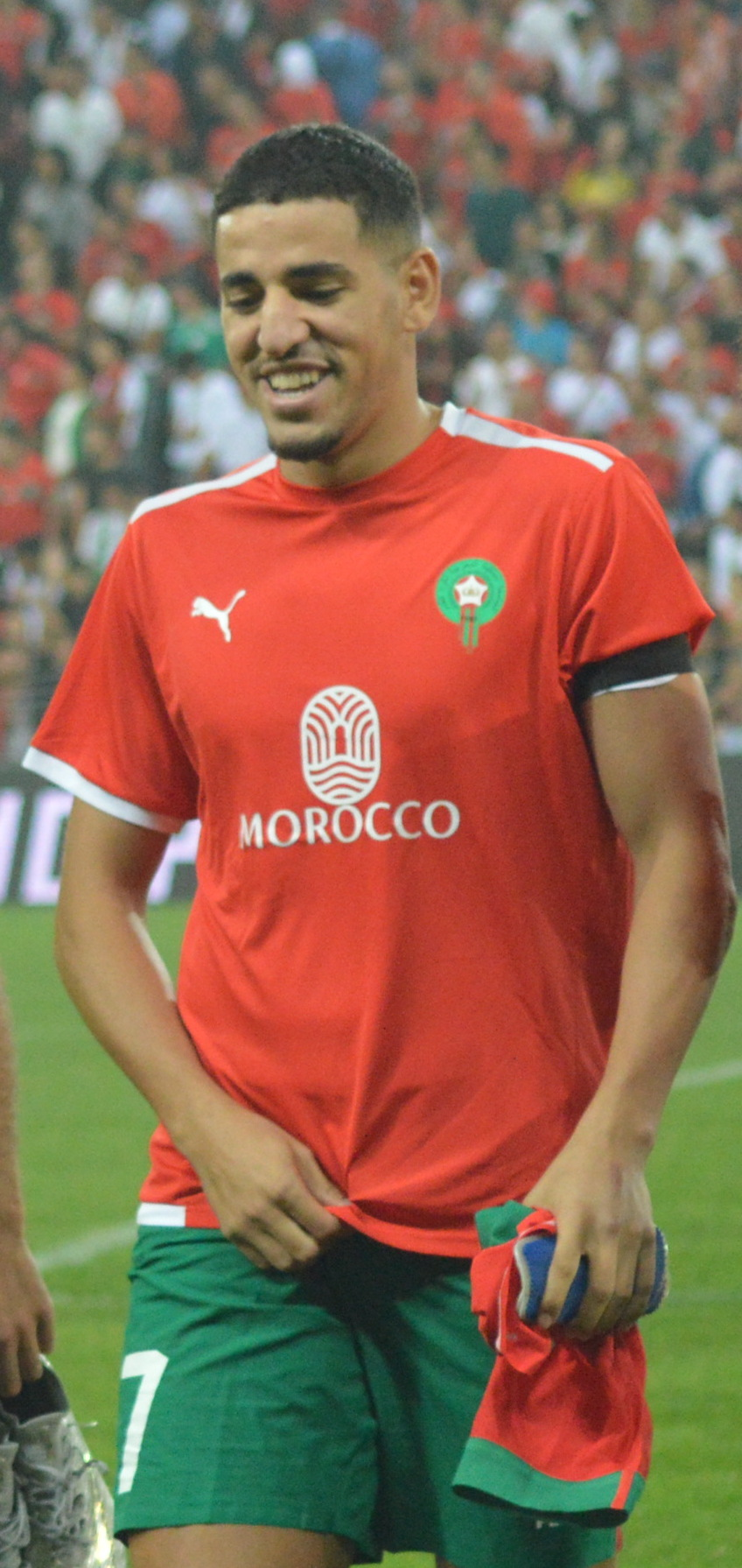
- Abqar with Morocco in 2023

Personal information
- Full name: Abdelkabir Abqar
- Date of birth: 10 March 1999 (age 27)
- Place of birth: Settat, Morocco
- Height: 1.88 m (6 ft 2 in)
- Position: Centre-back

Team information
- Current team: Getafe
- Number: 5

Youth career
- Mohammed VI Academy
- 2017–2018: Málaga

Senior career*
Years	Team	Apps	(Gls)
2017–2020	Málaga B	57	(1)
2018	Málaga	0	(0)
2020–2022	Alavés B	24	(0)
2021–2025	Alavés	91	(1)
2025–	Getafe	23	(0)

International career^{‡}
2024–	Morocco	3	(0)
- * Club domestic league appearances and goals as of 27 May 2026 ‡ National team caps and goals as of 22:45, 19 December 2024 (UTC)

Abdelkabir "Abdel" Abqar (Arabic: عبد الكبير أبقار; born 10 March 1999) is a Moroccan professional footballer who plays as a centre-back for Spanish club Getafe CF and the Morocco national team.

== Club career ==
Born in Settat, Abqar joined Málaga CF's youth setup in 2017 from Mohammed VI Football Academy. He made his senior debut with the former's reserves on 12 November 2017, starting in a 1–0 Tercera División away loss against CD Huétor Tájar.

Abqar made his first-team debut on 11 September 2018, starting in a 2–1 home loss against UD Almería for the season's Copa del Rey. It was his maiden appearance for the main squad, as he continued to feature regularly with the B's and suffering relegation at the end of the campaign.

On 22 July 2020, Abqar signed for another reserve team, Deportivo Alavés B in Segunda División B. The following 6 May, he renewed his contract until 2025.

Abqar first appeared with Alavés' main squad on 30 November 2021, playing the entire second half in a 3–0 away win over Unami CP, also for the national cup. He was definitely promoted to the first team for the 2022–23 season, with the club now in Segunda División, and became a first-choice as the club returned to La Liga at first attempt; his first professional goal occurred on 29 October 2022, as he scored the opener in a 2–1 home win over Real Oviedo.

Abqar made his top tier debut on 14 August 2023, starting in a 1–0 away loss to Cádiz CF. On 29 July 2025, he moved to fellow first division side Getafe CF on a three-year deal.

== International career ==
On 13 March 2023, Abqar was called up to the full squad by manager Walid Regragui, for friendlies against Brazil and Peru.

On 28 December 2023, Abqar was amongst the 27 players selected by coach Walid Regragui to represent Morocco in the 2023 Africa Cup of Nations.

He made his debut on 22 March 2024 in a friendly against Angola.

== Career statistics ==
=== International ===
As of match played 12 October 2024

Appearances and goals by national team and year
National team	Year	Apps	Goals
Morocco	2024	3	0
Total		3	0
