= 2023–24 CD Mirandés season =

CD Mirandés
2023–24 season
- President: Alfredo de Miguel Crespo
- Head coach: Alessio Lisci
- Stadium: Estadio Municipal de Anduva
- Segunda División: 18th
- Copa del Rey: Second round
- Top goalscorer: League: Carlos Martín (15); All: Carlos Martín (15)
- Biggest win: Mirandés 4–0 Alcorcón
- Biggest defeat: Sporting Gijón 3–0 Mirandés

The 2023–24 season was CD Mirandés's 97th season in existence and fifth consecutive season in the Segunda División, the second division of association football in Spain. They also competed in the Copa del Rey.

== Players ==
=== First-team squad ===
As of 31 August 2023.

Note: Flags indicate national team as defined under FIFA eligibility rules; some limited exceptions apply. Players may hold more than one non-FIFA nationality.

No.	Pos.	Nation	Player
1	GK	ESP	Ramón Juan (captain)
2	DF	ESP	David Vicente
3	DF	ESP	Álex Barbu
4	DF	ESP	Sergio Barcia
5	DF	ESP	Tachi
7	FW	ESP	Gabri Martínez (on loan from Girona)
8	MF	ESP	Álvaro Sanz
9	FW	ESP	Carlos Martín (on loan from Atlético Madrid)
10	MF	ESP	Alberto Reina
11	FW	MAR	Ilyas Chaira (on loan from Girona)
13	GK	ESP	Luis López
14	FW	CRO	Ivan Durdov (on loan from Oostende)
15	MF	ESP	Pablo Tomeo

No.	Pos.	Nation	Player
17	MF	RUS	Nikita Iosifov
18	FW	ESP	Javier Martón (on loan from Athletic Bilbao)
19	MF	FRA	Mathis Lachuer
20	DF	POR	Diogo Verdasca
21	DF	ESP	Diego Moreno (on loan from Osasuna)
22	MF	ESP	Miguel Baeza (on loan from Celta)
24	DF	USA	Jonathan Gómez (on loan from Real Sociedad)
26	DF	ESP	Juan María Alcedo (on loan from Albacete)
27	DF	ESP	Pablo Ramón (on loan from Real Madrid)
29	FW	ESP	Alan Godoy (on loan from Alavés)
31	GK	ESP	Iago Domínguez
32	DF	ESP	Rubén Sánchez (on loan from Espanyol)

=== Reserve team ===
Note: Flags indicate national team as defined under FIFA eligibility rules; some limited exceptions apply. Players may hold more than one non-FIFA nationality.

No.	Pos.	Nation	Player
28	FW	ESP	Ekhiotz Orobio
30	MF	ESP	Asier Ortiz

No.	Pos.	Nation	Player
34	DF	ESP	Diego Rosales

=== Out on loan ===
Note: Flags indicate national team as defined under FIFA eligibility rules; some limited exceptions apply. Players may hold more than one non-FIFA nationality.

No.	Pos.	Nation	Player
—	DF	GRE	Nikos Michelis (at Osasuna B until 30 June 2024)

== Transfers ==
=== In ===
Pos.	Player	Transferred from	Fee	Date	Source
MF	(Russia) Nikita Iosifov	(Belgium) Villarreal B	Free	5 July 2023	
DF	(Portugal) Diogo Verdasca	(Poland) Śląsk Wrocław	Free	27 July 2023	
FW	(Spain) Carlos Martín	(Spain) Atlético Madrid	Loan	4 August 2023	
DF	(Spain) Tachi	(Poland) Wisła Kraków	Free	4 August 2023	
FW	(Croatia) Ivan Durdov	(Belgium) Oostende	Loan	17 August 2023	

=== Out ===
Pos.	Player	Transferred to	Fee	Date	Source
MF	(Spain) César Gelabert	(France) Toulouse	Free	1 July 2023	
MF	(Spain) Oriol Rey	(Spain) Levante	Free	1 July 2023	
DF	(Spain) Álex Martín	(Spain) Elche	Free	6 July 2023	

== Pre-season and friendlies ==
Win Draw Loss Fixtures

15 July 2023 Friendly	Amorebieta	3–1	Mirandés	Amorebieta-Etxano
12:00 CEST (UTC+2)	Edwards 53'; Jauregi 65'; Quintero 82'	Report	Martínez 14'	Stadium: Urritxe; Referee: López Parra

22 July 2023 Friendly	Huesca	0–0	Mirandés	Tafalla
19:00 CEST (UTC+2)		Report		Stadium: Campo San Francisco; Referee: Miguel Sesma Espinosa

26 July 2023 Friendly	Real Madrid Castilla	1–0	Mirandés
19:00 CEST (UTC+2)	Zidane 86'

29 July 2023 Friendly	Mirandés	1–0	Valladolid
19:00 CEST (UTC+2)		Report

2 August 2023 Friendly	Osasuna B	1–0	Mirandés	Tajonar
19:00 CEST (UTC+2)		Report		Stadium: Tajonar Facilities

5 August 2023 Friendly	Logroñés	0–2	Mirandés	Cenicero
19:30 CEST (UTC+2)		Report		Stadium: Estadio de Las Viñas

== Competitions ==
=== Overall record ===
Competition	First match	Last match	Starting round	Record							
Competition	First match	Last match	Starting round	Pld	W	D	L	GF	GA	GD	Win %
Segunda División	14 August 2023	May 2024	Matchday 1	18	6	5	7	27	28	−1	33.33
Copa del Rey	TBD			1	1	0	0	2	1	+1	100.00
Total				19	7	5	7	29	29	+0	36.84

Last updated: 26 November 2023
Source: Soccerway

=== Segunda División ===
==== League table ====
Pos	Team	Pld	W	D	L	GF	GA	GD	Pts	Qualification or relegation
16	Eldense	42	12	14	16	46	56	−10	50	
17	Huesca	42	11	16	15	36	33	+3	49 (Note: Huesca finished ahead of Mirandés on head-to-head points: Huesca 1–1 Mirandés, Mirandés 0–3 Huesca)	
18	Mirandés	42	12	13	17	47	55	−8	49	
19	Amorebieta (R)	42	11	12	19	37	53	−16	45	Relegation to Primera Federación
20	Alcorcón (R)	42	10	14	18	32	53	−21	44	Relegation to Primera Federación

Updated to match(es) played on 2 Jun 2024. Source: LaLiga HyperMotion
Rules for classification: 1) Points; 2) Head-to-head points; 3) Head-to-head goal difference; 4) Goal difference; 5) Goals scored; 6) Fair-play points
(Note: Head-to-head record is used only after all the matches between the teams in question have been played)
(R) Relegated

==== Results summary ====
Overall								Home						Away					
Pld	W	D	L	GF	GA	GD	Pts	W	D	L	GF	GA	GD	W	D	L	GF	GA	GD
42	12	13	17	47	55	−8	49	9	5	7	30	26	+4	3	8	10	17	29	−12

Source: LaLiga.com

==== Results by round ====
Round	1	2	3	4	5	6	7	8	9	10	11	12	13	14	15	16	17	18
Ground	H	A	H	A	H	A	H	A	H	A	H	A	H	A	H	A	H	H
Result	W	L	L	D	W	L	L	W	L	L	D	W	W	D	L	D	W	D
Position	2	8	12	13	8	14	19	13	14	17	18	14	13	14	15	15	13	

Updated to match(es) played on 26 November 2023. Source: LaLiga.com
A = Away; H = Home; W = Win; D = Draw; L = Loss

==== Matches ====
The league fixtures were unveiled on 28 June 2023.

14 August 2023 1	Mirandés	4–0	Alcorcón	Miranda de Ebro
19:00 CEST (UTC+2)	Barcia 16' (pen.); Carlos Martín 37', 73'; Martínez 59'; Ramón (yellow card) 90+2'	Report	López (yellow card) 45+2'	Stadium: Estadio Municipal de Anduva; Attendance: 2,634; Referee: Miguel González Díaz

20 August 2023 2	Sporting Gijón	3–0	Mirandés	Gijón
19:30 CEST (UTC+2)	Otero 27'; Đurđević 34'; Campos 38'; Pașcanu (yellow card) 62'; Sánchez (yellow card) 84'	Report	Barbu (yellow card) 26'; Godoy (yellow card) 45+3'	Stadium: El Molinón; Attendance: 18,394; Referee: Salvador Lax Franco

27 August 2023 3	Mirandés	0–1	Espanyol	Miranda de Ebro
19:30 CEST (UTC+2)	Alcedo (yellow card) 27'; Ramón (yellow card) 68'; Moreno (yellow card) 69'; Rodríguez (yellow card) 84'	Report	Lozano (yellow card) 47'; Jofre 58'; Bare (yellow card) 68'	Stadium: Estadio Municipal de Anduva; Attendance: 3,452; Referee: Saúl Ais Reig

3 September 2023 4	Huesca	1–1	Mirandés	Huesca
21:00 CEST (UTC+2)	Martínez 55'	Report	Martín 84' (pen.)	Stadium: El Alcoraz; Referee: Rubén Ávalos Barrera

10 September 2023 5	Mirandés	4–3	Andorra	Miranda de Ebro
18:30 CEST (UTC+2)	Martínez 32'; Martín 43', 90+8'; Godoy 87'	Report	Alende 66'; Gil 90+1'; Pampín 90+3'	Stadium: Estadio Municipal de Anduva; Referee: Iván Caparrós Hernández

17 September 2023 6	Amorebieta	2–0	Mirandés	Lezama
14:00 CEST (UTC+2)	Edwards 7', 8'	Report		Stadium: Instalaciones de Lezama Campo 2 Referee: Daniel Jesús Trujillo Suárez

24 September 2023 7	Mirandés	1–3	Leganés	Miranda de Ebro
18:30 CEST (UTC+2)	Chaira 34'	Report	Djouahra 44'; De la Fuente 55'; García 90+5'	Stadium: Estadio Municipal de Anduva; Referee: Miguel González Díaz

1 October 2023 8	Zaragoza	0–1	Mirandés	Zaragoza
18:30 CEST (UTC+2)				Stadium: La Romareda

5 October 2023 9	Mirandés	1–3	Eibar	Miranda de Ebro
19:00 CEST (UTC+2)				Stadium: Estadio Municipal de Anduva

8 October 2023 10	Valladolid	3–2	Mirandés	Valladolid
16:15 CEST (UTC+2)				Stadium: José Zorrilla

14 October 2023 11	Mirandés	1–1	Tenerife	Miranda de Ebro
16:15 CEST (UTC+2)		Report		Stadium: Estadio Municipal de Anduva; Referee: Miguel Sesma Espinosa

21 October 2023 12	Villarreal B	0–3	Mirandés	Villarreal
16:15 CEST (UTC+2)		Report		Stadium: Ciudad Deportiva Villarreal CF; Referee: Jon Ander González Esteban

29 October 2023 13	Mirandés	2–1	Cartagena	Miranda de Ebro
14:00 CET (UTC+1)		Report		Stadium: Estadio Municipal de Anduva; Referee: Saúl Ais Reig

4 November 2023 14	Levante	2–2	Mirandés	Valencia
18:30 CET (UTC+1)		Report		Stadium: Estadi Ciutat de València; Referee: Raúl Martín González Francés

11 November 2023 15	Mirandés	1–2	Racing Ferrol	Miranda de Ebro
18:30 CET (UTC+1)		Report		Stadium: Estadio Municipal de Anduva; Referee: Rafael Sánchez López

19 November 2023 16	Eldense	2–2	Mirandés	Elda
16:15 CET (UTC+1)		Report		Stadium: Nuevo Pepico Amat; Referee: Manuel Jesús Orellana Cid

26 November 2023 17	Mirandés	2–1	Oviedo	Miranda de Ebro
16:15 CET (UTC+1)	Martón 27'; Chaira 90'	Report	Bastón 86'	Stadium: Estadio Municipal de Anduva; Referee: Andrés Fuentes Molina

3 December 2023 18	Mirandés	0–0	Racing Santander	Miranda de Ebro
18:30 CET (UTC+1)		Report		Stadium: Estadio Municipal de Anduva; Referee: Rubén Ávalos Barrera

9 December 2023 19	Burgos	v	Mirandés	Burgos
21:00 CET (UTC+1)		Report		Stadium: El Plantío

2 June 2024 42	Mirandés	v	Amorebieta	Miranda de Ebro
				Stadium: Estadio Municipal de Anduva

=== Copa del Rey ===
1 November 2023 First round	Utebo	1–2 (a.e.t.)	Mirandés	Utebo
18:00 CET (UTC+1)	Moreno 42' (o.g.)		Tomeo 52'; Durdov 94'	Stadium: Estadio Santa Ana; Referee: Adrián Cordero Vega

6 December 2023 Second round	Lugo	v	Mirandés	Lugo
19:00 CET (UTC+1)				Stadium: Anxo Carro
