= 2022–23 CD Mirandés season =

CD Mirandés
2022–23 season
- Owner: President
- Chairman: Alfredo de Miguel Crespo
- Head coach: Joseba Etxeberria
- Stadium: Estadio Municipal de Anduva
- Segunda División: 16th
- Copa del Rey: Second round
- Top goalscorer: League: Raúl García (19); All: Raúl García (19)
Home colours	Away colours	Third colours

The 2022–23 season was the 96th season in the history of CD Mirandés and their fourth consecutive season in the second division. The club participated in the Segunda División and the Copa del Rey.

== Players ==
As of 11 September 2022.

Note: Flags indicate national team as defined under FIFA eligibility rules; some limited exceptions apply. Players may hold more than one non-FIFA nationality.

No.	Pos.	Nation	Player
1	GK	ESP	Ramón Juan (captain)
2	DF	ESP	Sergio Santos (on loan from Real Madrid)
3	DF	ESP	Raúl Parra (on loan from Cádiz)
4	DF	ESP	Álex Martín
5	MF	ESP	Javi Serrano (on loan from Atlético Madrid)
6	MF	ESP	Beñat Prados (on loan from Athletic Bilbao)
7	FW	ESP	Nico Serrano (on loan from Athletic Bilbao)
8	MF	ESP	Juanlu (on loan from Sevilla)
9	FW	ESP	Raúl García (on loan from Real Betis)
10	MF	ESP	César Gelabert
11	FW	ESP	Simón Moreno
12	DF	ESP	José Salinas (on loan from Elche)

No.	Pos.	Nation	Player
13	GK	ESP	Alfonso Herrero
14	FW	ESP	Óscar Pinchi (on loan from Las Palmas)
16	DF	ESP	Raúl Navas
17	FW	SVK	Samuel Mráz (on loan from Spezia)
19	MF	ESP	Manu García
20	MF	ESP	Oriol Rey (vice-captain)
21	MF	ESP	Roberto López (on loan from Real Sociedad)
22	FW	ESP	Jofre Carreras (on loan from Espanyol)
23	FW	POR	Marcos Paulo (on loan from Atlético Madrid)
26	DF	ESP	Álex Barbu
27	DF	GRE	Nikos Michelis
31	GK	ESP	Iago Domínguez

=== Reserve team ===
Note: Flags indicate national team as defined under FIFA eligibility rules; some limited exceptions apply. Players may hold more than one non-FIFA nationality.

No.	Pos.	Nation	Player
29	DF	ESP	Juan Durán
30	FW	GBS	Salifo Caropitche
32	MF	ESP	Nacho Castillo

No.	Pos.	Nation	Player
33	DF	ESP	Nico Gudiño
34	DF	ESP	Adrián Pica
35	DF	ESP	Manolo Ferreres

== Transfers ==
=== In ===
Date	Player	From	Type	Fee	Ref
1 July 2022	(Spain) Roberto López	Real Sociedad B	Loan	Free	
14 July 2022	(Spain) Beñat Prados	Athletic Bilbao	Loan		
30 July 2022	(Spain) José Salinas	Elche	Loan		
4 August 2022	(Spain) Raúl Parra	Cádiz	Loan		
8 August 2022	(Spain) Juanlu Sánchez	Sevilla	Loan		
11 August 2022	(Spain) Nico Serrano	Athletic Bilbao	Loan		
14 August 2022	(Spain) Jofre Carreras	Espanyol	Loan		
1 September 2022	(Portugal) Marcos Paulo	Atlético Madrid	Loan		

=== Out ===
Date	Player	To	Type	Fee	Ref
7 July 2022	(Spain) Raúl Lizoain	Andorra	Transfer	Free	
10 August 2022	(Spain) Víctor Meseguer	Granada	Transfer	Undisclosed	

== Pre-season and friendlies ==
Win Draw Loss Fixtures

23 July 2022 Friendly	SD Logroñés	1–1	Mirandés
CEST (UTC+2)

27 July 2022 Friendly	Athletic Bilbao B	0–0	Mirandés
CEST (UTC+2)

31 July 2022 Friendly	Mirandés	0–3	Athletic Bilbao
CEST (UTC+2)

5 August 2022 Friendly	Mirandés	1–2	Osasuna
CEST (UTC+2)

== Competitions ==
=== Overall record ===
Competition	First match	Last match	Starting round	Final position	Record							
Competition	First match	Last match	Starting round	Final position	Pld	W	D	L	GF	GA	GD	Win %
Segunda División	13 August 2022	27 May 2023	Matchday 1	16th	42	13	13	16	48	54	−6	30.95
Copa del Rey	13 November 2022	20 December 2022	First round	Second round	2	1	0	1	2	2	+0	50.00
Total					44	14	13	17	50	56	−6	31.82

Source: Soccerway

=== Segunda División ===
==== League table ====
Pos	Team	Pld	W	D	L	GF	GA	GD	Pts	Qualification or relegation
14	Leganés	42	14	11	17	37	42	−5	53 (Note: Zaragoza finished ahead of Leganés on head-to-head goal difference: Leganés 2–1 Zaragoza, Zaragoza 3–0 Leganés.)	
15	Huesca	42	11	19	12	36	36	0	52 (Note: Huesca finished ahead of Mirandés on head-to-head points: Mirandés 1–1 Huesca, Huesca 1–0 Mirandés.)	
16	Mirandés	42	13	13	16	48	54	−6	52	
17	Sporting Gijón	42	11	17	14	43	48	−5	50 (Note: Overall goal difference: Sporting Gijón −5, Villarreal B −6.)	
18	Villarreal B	42	13	11	18	49	55	−6	50	Not eligible for promotion

Source: LaLiga SmartBank
Rules for classification: 1) points; 2) head-to-head points; 3) head-to-head goal difference; 4) goal difference; 5) number of goals scored
Notes:

Notes

1. Reserve teams are not eligible for promotion to the same league as the first team.

==== Results summary ====
Overall								Home						Away					
Pld	W	D	L	GF	GA	GD	Pts	W	D	L	GF	GA	GD	W	D	L	GF	GA	GD
0	0	0	0	0	0	0	0	0	0	0	0	0	0	0	0	0	0	0	0

Last updated: November 2022.
Source: LaLiga SmartBank

==== Results by round ====
Round	1
Ground	
Result	
Position	

Updated to match(es) played on November 2022. Source: LaLiga SmartBank
A = Away; H = Home; W = Win; D = Draw; L = Loss

==== Matches ====
The league fixtures were announced on 23 June 2022.
