= Julen Martínez =

Spanish footballer (born 2005)

Personal information
- Full name: Julen Martínez Landa
- Date of birth: 20 April 2005 (age 21)
- Place of birth: Berantevilla, Spain
- Height: 1.81 m (5 ft 11 in)
- Position: Forward

Team information
- Current team: Mirandés
- Number: 42

Youth career
- 2018–2024: Alavés

Senior career*
| Years | Team | Apps | (Gls) |
| 2024–2025 | Alavés C | 24 | (1) |
| 2025–2026 | Mirandés B | 6 | (2) |
| 2026– | Mirandés | 5 | (0) |
- * Club domestic league appearances and goals as of 31 May 2026

Julen Martínez Landa (born 20 April 2005) is a Spanish footballer who plays as a forward for CD Mirandés.

== Career ==
Born in Berantevilla, Álava, Basque Country, Martínez joined Deportivo Alavés' youth sides in 2018. He suffered a serious injury in 2023, before making his senior debut with the C-team in Tercera Federación in 2024.

In July 2025, Martínez left Alavés and signed for CD Mirandés, being initially assigned to the reserves but making the pre-season with the first team. In the following month, however, he suffered an injury in a pre-season match against Real Sociedad B, only returning to action in March 2026.

Martínez made his professional debut with the Jabatos on 26 April 2026, coming on as a late substitute for Unax del Cura in a 2–1 Segunda División home win over Cultural y Deportiva Leonesa.
