= List of Spanish football transfers summer 2023 =

This is a list of Spanish football transfers for the summer sale prior to the 2023–24 season of La Liga and Segunda División. Only moves from La Liga and Segunda División are listed.

== La Liga ==
=== Alavés ===
==== In ====
Date	Player	From	Type	Fee	Ref
1 July 2023	(Serbia) Nikola Maraš	Almería	Buyout clause	Undisclosed	
9 July 2023	(Spain) Ander Guevara	Real Sociedad	Transfer	Undisclosed	
21 July 2023	(Argentina) Giuliano Simeone	Atlético Madrid	Loan		
25 July 2023	(Spain) Antonio Blanco	Real Madrid	Transfer	Undisclosed	
28 July 2023	(Spain) Rafa Marín	Real Madrid	Loan		
11 August 2023	(Spain) Andoni Gorosabel	Real Sociedad	Transfer	Undisclosed	
13 August 2023	(Spain) Kike García	Osasuna	Transfer	Undisclosed	
20 August 2023	(Argentina) Nahuel Tenaglia	(Argentina) Talleres	Transfer	Undisclosed	
26 August 2023	(Spain) Samu Omorodion	Atlético Madrid	Loan		
27 August 2023	(Romania) Ianis Hagi	(Scotland) Rangers	Loan		
2 September 2023	(Spain) Jon Karrikaburu	Real Sociedad	Loan		
2 September 2023	(Spain) Álex Sola	Real Sociedad	Loan		

==== Out ====
Date	Player	To	Type	Fee	Ref
1 July 2023	(Spain) Antonio Blanco	Real Madrid	Loan return		
1 July 2023	(Spain) Rober	Real Betis	Loan return		
1 July 2023	(Argentina) Nahuel Tenaglia	(Argentina) Talleres	Loan return		
1 July 2023	(Spain) Asier Villalibre	Athletic Bilbao	Loan return		
3 July 2023	(Japan) Taichi Hara	(Japan) Kyoto Sanga	Transfer	Undisclosed	
4 July 2023	(Spain) Jason	Released			
5 July 2023	(Spain) Toni Moya	Released			
15 July 2023	(Spain) Víctor Laguardia	Retired			
18 July 2023	(Colombia) Anderson Arroyo	(England) Liverpool	Loan return		
24 July 2023	(Spain) Imanol Baz	Real Unión	Transfer	Undisclosed	
28 July 2023	(France) Florian Lejeune	Rayo Vallecano	Transfer	€2.5m	
28 July 2023	(Spain) Julio Martínez	Real Unión	Transfer	Undisclosed	
4 August 2023	(Spain) Alan Godoy	Mirandés	Loan		
8 August 2023	(Equatorial Guinea) Álex Balboa	Huesca	Loan		
13 August 2023	(Spain) Salva Sevilla	Released			
1 September 2023	(Senegal) Mamadou Sylla	Valladolid	Transfer	Free	

=== Almería ===
==== In ====
Date	Player	From	Type	Fee	Ref
3 July 2023	(Colombia) Luis Suárez	(France) Marseille	Transfer	Undisclosed	
6 July 2023	(Spain) Edgar González	Real Betis	Transfer	Undisclosed	
5 August 2023	(Senegal) Dion Lopy	(France) Reims	Transfer	Undisclosed	
9 August 2023	(Spain) Sergio Arribas	Real Madrid	Transfer	Undisclosed	
9 August 2023	(Spain) Marc Pubill	Levante	Transfer	Undisclosed	
10 August 2023	(Ghana) Iddrisu Baba	Mallorca	Loan		
16 August 2023	(Mali) Ibrahima Koné	(France) Lorient	Transfer	Undisclosed	
16 August 2023	(Portugal) Luís Maximiano	(Italy) Lazio	Loan		
1 September 2023	(Mexico) César Montes	Espanyol	Transfer	Undisclosed	

==== Out ====
Date	Player	To	Type	Fee	Ref
1 July 2023	(Serbia) Nikola Maraš	Alavés	Buyout clause	Undisclosed	
21 July 2023	(Uruguay) Juan Manuel Gutiérrez	(Uruguay) Boston River	Loan		
21 July 2023	(Spain) Arnau Solà	Cartagena	Loan		
29 July 2023	(Mali) El Bilal Touré	(Italy) Atalanta	Transfer	€30m	
3 August 2023	(Spain) Carlos Rojas	Murcia	Loan		
4 August 2023	(Uruguay) Cristian Olivera	(United States) LAFC	Transfer	Undisclosed	
21 August 2023	(Serbia) Srđan Babić	(Russia) Spartak Moscow	Transfer	Undisclosed	
25 August 2023	(England) Arvin Appiah	(England) Rotherham United	Loan		
1 September 2023	(Portugal) Gui Guedes	(Portugal) Porto B	Loan		

=== Athletic Bilbao ===
==== In ====
Date	Player	From	Type	Fee	Ref
1 July 2023	(Spain) Asier Villalibre	Alavés	Loan return		
5 July 2023	(Spain) Javier Martón	Real Sociedad B	Transfer	Free	

==== Out ====
Date	Player	To	Type	Fee	Ref
1 July 2023	(Spain) Oier Zarraga	(Italy) Udinese	Transfer	Free	
5 July 2023	(Spain) Iñigo Martínez	Barcelona	Transfer	Free	
24 July 2023	(Spain) Álex Petxarroman	Andorra	Transfer	Undisclosed	
25 July 2023	(Spain) Juan Artola	Alcorcón	Loan		
5 August 2023	(Spain) Unai Vencedor	Eibar	Loan		
10 August 2023	(Spain) Nico Serrano	(Netherlands) PEC Zwolle	Loan		
23 August 2023	(Spain) Jon Morcillo	Amorebieta	Loan		
1 September 2023	(Spain) Javier Martón	Mirandés	Loan		

=== Atlético Madrid ===
==== In ====
Date	Player	From	Type	Fee	Ref
3 July 2023	(Spain) Javi Galán	Celta Vigo	Transfer	Undisclosed	
5 July 2023	(Turkey) Çağlar Söyüncü	(England) Leicester City	Transfer	Free	
6 July 2023	(Spain) César Azpilicueta	(England) Chelsea	Transfer	Free	
6 July 2023	(Uruguay) Santiago Mouriño	(Uruguay) Racing Montevideo	Transfer	Undisclosed	
21 August 2023	(Spain) Samu Omorodion	Granada	Transfer	Undisclosed	

==== Out ====
Date	Player	To	Type	Fee	Ref
1 July 2023	(Brazil) Matheus Cunha	(England) Wolverhampton Wanderers	Transfer	€51.216m	
1 July 2023	(Central African Republic) Geoffrey Kondogbia	(France) Marseille	Transfer	Undisclosed	
1 July 2023	(Spain) Javi Serrano	(Austria) Sturm Graz	Loan		
3 July 2023	(Spain) Manu Sánchez	Celta Vigo	Transfer	Undisclosed	
14 July 2023	(Brazil) Renan Lodi	(France) Marseille	Transfer	€13m	
20 July 2023	(Republic of Ireland) Matt Doherty	(England) Wolverhampton Wanderers	Transfer	Free	
21 July 2023	(Argentina) Giuliano Simeone	Alavés	Loan		
3 August 2023	(Spain) Víctor Mollejo	Zaragoza	Loan		
4 August 2023	(Spain) Carlos Martín	Mirandés	Loan		
8 August 2023	(Spain) Germán Valera	Zaragoza	Loan		
11 August 2023	(Uruguay) Santiago Mouriño	Zaragoza	Loan		
17 August 2023	(Spain) Sergio Camello	Rayo Vallecano	Transfer	Undisclosed	
26 August 2023	(Spain) Samu Omorodion	Alavés	Loan		
1 September 2023	(Portugal) João Félix	Barcelona	Loan		
1 September 2023	(Spain) Borja Garcés	Elche	Loan		
5 September 2023	(Belgium) Yannick Carrasco	(Saudi Arabia) Al Shabab	Transfer	€15m	

=== Barcelona ===
==== In ====
Date	Player	From	Type	Fee	Ref
1 July 2023	(Germany) İlkay Gündoğan	(England) Manchester City	Transfer	Free	
5 July 2023	(Spain) Iñigo Martínez	Athletic Bilbao	Transfer	Free	
19 July 2023	(Spain) Oriol Romeu	Girona	Transfer	Undisclosed	
1 September 2023	(Portugal) João Cancelo	(England) Manchester City	Loan		
1 September 2023	(Senegal) Mamadou Fall	(United States) LAFC	Loan		
1 September 2023	(Portugal) João Félix	Atlético Madrid	Loan		

==== Out ====
Date	Player	To	Type	Fee	Ref
17 July 2023	(Spain) Sergio Busquets	(United States) Inter Miami	Transfer	Free	
18 July 2023	(Spain) Pablo Torre	Girona	Loan		
21 July 2023	(Spain) Jordi Alba	(United States) Inter Miami	Transfer	Free	
21 July 2023	(France) Samuel Umtiti	(France) Lille	Transfer	Free	
26 July 2023	(Morocco) Chadi Riad	Real Betis	Loan		
27 July 2023	(Spain) Álex Collado	Real Betis	Transfer	Undisclosed	
29 July 2023	(Spain) Nico González	(Portugal) Porto	Transfer	€8.5m	
30 July 2023	(Spain) Arnau Tenas	(France) Paris Saint-Germain	Transfer	Free	
1 August 2023	(Mexico) Julián Araujo	Las Palmas	Loan		
9 August 2023	(Ivory Coast) Franck Kessié	(Saudi Arabia) Al-Ahli	Transfer	€12.5m	
11 August 2023	(Spain) Estanis Pedrola	(Italy) Sampdoria	Loan		
12 August 2023	(France) Ousmane Dembélé	(France) Paris Saint-Germain	Transfer	€50.4m	
14 August 2023	(Spain) Álex Valle	Levante	Loan		
21 August 2023	(United States) Sergiño Dest	(Netherlands) PSV	Loan		
1 September 2023	(Morocco) Abde Ezzalzouli	Real Betis	Transfer	€7.5m	
1 September 2023	(Spain) Ansu Fati	(England) Brighton & Hove Albion	Loan		
1 September 2023	(Spain) Eric García	Girona	Loan		
1 September 2023	(France) Clément Lenglet	(England) Aston Villa	Loan		

=== Cádiz ===
==== In ====
Date	Player	From	Type	Fee	Ref
1 July 2023	(Spain) Álvaro Jiménez	Las Palmas	Loan return		
1 July 2023	(Venezuela) Darwin Machís	Valladolid	Loan		
3 July 2023	(Argentina) Gonzalo Escalante	(Italy) Lazio	Transfer	Undisclosed	
5 July 2023	(Spain) Javi Hernández	Leganés	Loan		
25 July 2023	(Brazil) Lucas Pires	(Brazil) Santos	Loan		
22 August 2023	(Uruguay) Maxi Gómez	(Turkey) Trabzonspor	Loan		
1 September 2023	(Mali) Rominigue Kouamé	(France) Troyes	Transfer	Undisclosed	
1 September 2023	(Spain) Robert Navarro	Real Sociedad	Loan		

==== Out ====
Date	Player	To	Type	Fee	Ref
5 July 2023	(Spain) Álvaro Jiménez	(Iran) Tractor	Loan		
12 July 2023	(Democratic Republic of the Congo) Théo Bongonda	(Russia) Spartak Moscow	Transfer	Undisclosed	
1 September 2023	(Montenegro) Milutin Osmajić	(England) Preston North End	Transfer	Undisclosed	

=== Celta Vigo ===
==== In ====
Date	Player	From	Type	Fee	Ref
1 July 2023	(Spain) Denis Suárez	Espanyol	Loan return		
1 July 2023	(Spain) Miguel Baeza	(Portugal) Rio Ave	Loan return		
1 July 2023	(Spain) Santi Mina	(Saudi Arabia) Al-Shabab	Loan return		
1 July 2023	(Spain) Sergio Carreira	Villarreal CF B	Loan return		
1 July 2023	(Spain) Julen Lobete	(Netherlands) RKC Waalwijk	Loan return		
1 July 2023	(Spain) Rubén Blanco	(France) Marseille	Loan return		
1 July 2023	(Mexico) Orbelín Pineda	(Greece) AEK Athens	Loan return		
1 July 2023	(Spain) José Fontán	(Netherlands) Go Ahead Eagles	Loan return		
1 July 2023	(Spain) Carlez Pérez	(Italy) AS Roma	Transfer	€5.20m	
3 July 2023	(Spain) Manu Sánchez	Atlético Madrid	Transfer	Undisclosed	
19 July 2023	(Ivory Coast) Jonathan Bamba	(France) Lille	Transfer	Undisclosed	
20 July 2023	Carlos Dotor	Real Madrid Castilla	Transfer		
10 August 2023	(Sweden) Carl Starfelt	(Scotland) Celtic	Transfer	Undisclosed	
28 August 2023	(Greece) Anastasios Douvikas	(Netherlands) Utrecht	Transfer	Undisclosed	
1 September 2023	(Serbia) Mihailo Ristić	(Portugal) Benfica	Transfer	Undisclosed	
1 September 2023	(Spain) Vicente Guaita	(England) Crystal Palace	Transfer	?	

==== Out ====
Date	Player	To	Type	Fee	Ref
1 July 2023	(Mexico) Orbelin Pineda	(Greece) AEK Athens	Transfer	€6.5M	
3 July 2023	(Spain) Javi Galán	Atlético Madrid	Transfer	Undisclosed	
12 July 2023	(Spain) Álvaro Santos	(Belgium) Lommel	Transfer	Free	
30 July 2023	(Spain) Rubén Blanco	(France) Marseille	Transfer	€3m	

=== Getafe ===
==== In ====
Date	Player	From	Type	Fee	Ref
1 July 2023	(Honduras) Anthony Lozano	Cádiz	Free		
5 July 2023	(Brazil) Daniel Fuzato	Ibiza	Loan		
20 July 2023	(Spain) José Ángel Carmona	Sevilla	Loan		
1 September 2023	(England) Mason Greenwood	(England) Manchester United	Loan		
1 September 2023	(Spain) Óscar Rodríguez	Sevilla	Loan		
1 September 2023	(Spain) Diego Rico	Real Sociedad	Loan		

==== Out ====
Date	Player	To	Type	Fee	Ref
15 July 2023	(Czech Republic) Jakub Jankto	(Italy) Cagliari	Transfer	Undisclosed	

=== Girona ===
==== In ====
Date	Player	From	Type	Fee	Ref
30 June 2023	(Ukraine) Artem Dovbyk	(Ukraine) Dnipro	Transfer		
6 July 2023	(Argentina) Paulo Gazzaniga	(England) Fulham	Transfer	Free	
13 July 2023	(Brazil) Sávio	(France) Troyes	Loan		
7 July 2023	(Netherlands) Daley Blind	(Germany) Bayern Munich	Transfer	Free	
14 July 2023	(Venezuela) Yangel Herrera	(England) Manchester City	Transfer		
18 July 2023	(Spain) Pablo Torre	Barcelona	Loan		
22 July 2023	(Spain) Iván Martín	Villarreal	Transfer		
1 September 2023	(Colombia) Jhon Solís	(Colombia) Atlético Nacional	Transfer	?	
1 September 2023	(Spain) Eric García	Barcelona	Loan		

==== Out ====
Date	Player	To	Type	Fee	Ref
19 July 2023	(Spain) Oriol Romeu	Barcelona	Transfer	Undisclosed	
31 August 2023	(Uruguay) Santiago Bueno	(England) Wolverhampton Wanderers	Transfer	€10m	

=== Granada ===
==== In ====
Date	Player	From	Type	Fee	Ref
1 July 2023	(Israel) Shon Weissman	Valladolid	Transfer		
1 July 2023	(Senegal) Famara Diédhiou	(Turkey) Alanyaspor	Transfer		
15 July 2023	(Spain) Jesús Vallejo	Real Madrid	Loan		
27 July 2023	(Spain) Gerard Gumbau	Elche	Free		
4 August 2023	(Spain) Gonzalo Villar	(Italy) Roma	Transfer	Undisclosed	
7 August 2023	(Portugal) Wilson Manafá	(Portugal) Porto	Transfer	Free	
30 August 2023	(Argentina) Lucas Boyé	Elche	Transfer	€7M + add-ons	

==== Out ====
Date	Player	To	Type	Fee	Ref
6 July 2023	(Spain) Adrián Butzke	(Portugal) Vitória de Guimarães	Transfer	Undisclosed	
21 August 2023	(Spain) Samu Omorodion	Atlético Madrid	Transfer	Undisclosed	
31 August 2023	(Spain) Alberto Soro	(Portugal) Vizela	Loan		

=== Las Palmas ===
==== In ====
Date	Player	From	Type	Fee	Ref
16 June 2023	(Spain) Javier Muñoz	Eibar	Transfer	Free	
19 June 2023	(Spain) Sandro Ramírez	Huesca	Transfer		
22 June 2023	(Spain) Cristian Herrera	Ibiza	Transfer	Free	
11 July 2023	(Netherlands) Daley Sinkgraven	(Germany) Bayer Leverkusen	Transfer	Free	
24 July 2023	(Spain) Aarón Escandell	Cartagena	Transfer		
30 July 2023	(Morocco) Munir El Haddadi	Getafe	Transfer	Free	
1 August 2023	(Mexico) Julián Araujo	Barcelona	Loan		
11 August 2023	(Spain) Mika Mármol	Andorra	Transfer		
17 August 2023	(Guinea) Sory Kaba	(Denmark) Midtjylland	Transfer		
23 August 2023	(Argentina) Máximo Perrone	(England) Manchester City	Loan		

==== Out ====
Date	Player	To	Type	Fee	Ref
1 July 2023	(Spain) Álvaro Jiménez	Cádiz	Loan return		
26 July 2023	(Spain) Álex Domínguez	(France) Toulouse	Transfer	Undisclosed	

=== Mallorca ===
==== In ====
Date	Player	From	Type	Fee	Ref
26 June 2023	(Spain) Toni Lato	Valencia	Transfer		
27 June 2023	(Spain) Omar Mascarell	Elche	Transfer		
18 July 2023	(Belgium) Siebe Van der Heyden	(Belgium) Union SG	Transfer	Undisclosed	
10 August 2023	(Portugal) Samú Costa	Almería	Transfer		
11 August 2023	(Spain) Sergi Darder	Espanyol	Transfer		
11 August 2023	(Canada) Cyle Larin	(Belgium) Club Brugge	Transfer		
28 August 2023	(Spain) Iván Cuéllar	Sporting Gijón	Transfer		

==== Out ====
Date	Player	To	Type	Fee	Ref
8 July 2023	(South Korea) Lee Kang-in	(France) Paris Saint-Germain	Transfer	€22m	
11 July 2023	(Spain) Jordi Mboula	(Italy) Hellas Verona	Transfer	Undisclosed	
10 August 2023	(Ghana) Iddrisu Baba	Almería	Loan		

=== Osasuna ===
==== In ====
Date	Player	From	Type	Fee	Ref
9 June 2023	(Spain) Alejandro Catena	Rayo Vallecano	Free		
13 June 2023	(Spain) José Arnaiz	Leganés	Free		
26 July 2023	(Colombia) Johan Mojica	Osasuna	Loan		
10 August 2023	(Spain) Raúl García	Real Betis	Transfer		

==== Out ====
Date	Player	To	Type	Fee	Ref
13 August 2023	(Spain) Kike García	Alavés	Transfer	Undisclosed	

=== Rayo Vallecano ===
==== In ====
Date	Player	From	Type	Fee	Ref
5 July 2023	(Spain) Aridane Hernández	Osasuna	Free		
17 July 2023	(Uruguay) Alfonso Espino	Cádiz	Free		
28 July 2023	(France) Florian Lejeune	Alavés	Transfer	€2.5m	
10 August 2023	(Spain) Kike Pérez	Valladolid	Loan		
17 August 2023	(Spain) Sergio Camello	Atlético Madrid	Transfer	Undisclosed	
17 August 2023	(Spain) Jorge de Frutos	Levante	Transfer		
18 August 2023	(Spain) Daniel Cárdenas	Levante	Transfer		
26 August 2023	(Romania) Andrei Rațiu	Huesca	Transfer		

==== Out ====
Date	Player	To	Type	Fee	Ref
1 July 2023	(Spain) Fran García	Real Madrid	Transfer	€5m	

=== Real Betis ===
==== In ====
Date	Player	From	Type	Fee	Ref
1 July 2023	(Spain) Rober	Alavés	Loan return		
6 July 2023	(Spain) Ayoze Pérez	(England) Leicester City	Transfer	Free	
17 July 2023	(Spain) Marc Roca	(England) Leeds United	Loan		
18 July 2023	(Spain) Héctor Bellerin	(Portugal) Sporting CP	Transfer	Free	
24 July 2023	(Spain) Marc Bartra	(Turkey) Trabzonspor	Transfer		
26 July 2023	(Spain) Isco	Free Agent	Transfer	Free	
26 July 2023	(Morocco) Chadi Riad	Barcelona	Loan		
27 July 2023	(Spain) Álex Collado	Barcelona	Transfer	Undisclosed	
11 August 2023	(Spain) Sergi Altimira	Getafe	Transfer		
1 September 2023	(Morocco) Abde Ezzalzouli	Barcelona	Transfer	€7.5m	

==== Out ====
Date	Player	To	Type	Fee	Ref
4 July 2023	(Spain) Félix Garreta	Amorebieta	Loan		
6 July 2023	(Spain) Edgar González	Almería	Transfer	Undisclosed	
10 July 2023	(Spain) Fran Delgado	(Portugal) Farense	Transfer	Undisclosed	
14 July 2023	(Spain) Rober	(Netherlands) NEC	Loan		
17 July 2023	(Spain) Dani Martín	Andorra	Free		
21 July 2023	(Spain) Loren Morón	(Greece) Aris	Free		
24 July 2023	(Spain) Sergio Canales	(Mexico) Monterrey	Transfer		
26 July 2023	(Mexico) Diego Lainez	(Mexico) Tigres	Transfer		
31 July 2023	(Spain) Álex Collado	(Saudi Arabia) Al-Okhdood	Loan		
8 August 2023	(Spain) Martin Montoya	(Greece) Aris	Free		
1 September 2023	(Ivory Coast) Paul Akouokou	(France) Lyon	Transfer	€3m	

=== Real Madrid ===
==== In ====
Date	Player	From	Type	Fee	Ref
1 July 2023	(England) Jude Bellingham	(Germany) Borussia Dortmund	Transfer	€103m	
1 July 2023	(Spain) Antonio Blanco	Alavés	Loan return		
1 July 2023	(Spain) Brahim Díaz	(Italy) Milan	Loan return		
1 July 2023	(Spain) Fran García	Rayo Vallecano	Transfer	€5m	
1 July 2023	(Spain) Joselu	Espanyol	Loan		
7 July 2023	(Turkey) Arda Güler	(Turkey) Fenerbahçe	Transfer	€20m	
14 August 2023	(Spain) Kepa Arrizabalaga	(England) Chelsea	Loan		

==== Out ====
Date	Player	To	Type	Fee	Ref
1 July 2023	(France) Karim Benzema	(Saudi Arabia) Al-Ittihad	Transfer	Free	
6 July 2023	(Spain) Marco Asensio	(France) Paris Saint-Germain	Transfer	Free	
25 July 2023	(Spain) Antonio Blanco	Alavés	Transfer	Undisclosed	
28 July 2023	(Spain) Rafa Marín	Alavés	Loan		
9 August 2023	(Spain) Sergio Arribas	Almería	Transfer	Undisclosed	
1 September 2023	(Brazil) Reinier	(Italy) Frosinone	Loan		

=== Real Sociedad ===
==== In ====
Date	Player	From	Type	Fee	Ref
1 July 2023	(Mali) Hamari Traoré	(France) Rennes	Transfer	Free	
2 August 2023	(Portugal) André Silva	(Germany) RB Leipzig	Loan		
11 August 2023	(Norway) Bryan Fiabema	(England) Chelsea	Transfer	Free	
19 August 2023	(Russia) Arsen Zakharyan	(Russia) Dynamo Moscow	Transfer	Undisclosed	
27 August 2023	(Scotland) Kieran Tierney	(England) Arsenal	Loan		
1 September 2023	(Spain) Álvaro Odriozola	Real Madrid	Transfer		

==== Out ====
Date	Player	To	Type	Fee	Ref
21 June 2023	(Spain) Portu	Getafe	Transfer		
26 June 2023	(Spain) Roberto López	Tenerife	Loan		
1 July 2023	(France) Modibo Sagnan	(Netherlands) Utrecht	Transfer	Undisclosed	
9 July 2023	(Spain) Ander Guevara	Alavés	Transfer	Undisclosed	
17 July 2023	(Spain) Andoni Zubiaurre	Eldense	Free		
3 August 2023	(Spain) Asier Illarramendi	(United States) Dallas	Transfer	Free	
11 August 2023	(Spain) Andoni Gorosabel	Alavés	Transfer	Undisclosed	
2 September 2023	(Spain) Jon Karrikaburu	Alavés	Loan		
2 September 2023	(Spain) Álex Sola	Alavés	Loan		

=== Sevilla ===
==== In ====
Date	Player	From	Type	Fee	Ref
1 July 2023	(France) Loïc Badé	(France) Rennes	Transfer	€12m	
1 July 2023	(Denmark) Thomas Delaney	(Germany) 1899 Hoffenheim	Loan return		
1 July 2023	(Morocco) Oussama Idrissi	(Netherlands) Feyenoord	Loan return		
1 July 2023	(Spain) Adrià Pedrosa	Espanyol	Transfer	Free	
4 August 2023	(Switzerland) Djibril Sow	(Germany) Eintracht Frankfurt	Transfer	€10m	
20 August 2023	(Norway) Ørjan Nyland	(Germany) RB Leipzig	Transfer	Free	
24 August 2023	(Belgium) Dodi Lukebakio	(Germany) Hertha BSC	Transfer		
1 September 2023	(Dominican Republic) Mariano	Real Madrid	Transfer		
1 September 2023	(France) Boubakary Soumaré	(England) Leicester	Loan		
4 September 2023	(Spain) Sergio Ramos	(France) PSG	Transfer	Free	

==== Out ====
Date	Player	To	Type	Fee	Ref
20 July 2023	(Spain) José Ángel Carmona	Getafe	Loan		
25 July 2023	(Spain) Luismi Cruz	Tenerife	Loan		
30 July 2023	(Netherlands) Karim Rekik	(United Arab Emirates) Al Jazira Club	Transfer		
2 August 2023	(Portugal) Rony Lopes	(Portugal) Braga	Transfer	Free	
16 August 2023	(Spain) Pedro Ortiz	(Portugal) Vizela	Loan		
17 August 2023	(Sweden) Ludwig Augustinsson	(Belgium) Anderlecht	Loan		
22 August 2023	(Denmark) Thomas Delaney	(Belgium) Anderlecht	Loan		
23 August 2023	(Argentina) Gonzalo Montiel	(England) Nottingham Forest	Loan		

=== Valencia ===
==== In ====
Date	Player	From	Type	Fee	Ref
1 July 2023	(Turkey) Cenk Özkacar	(France) Lyon	Transfer	€5m	
8 July 2023	(Spain) Pepelu	Levante	Transfer	€5m	
17 July 2023	(Spain) Jorge	Leganés	Transfer		
21 August 2023	(Spain) Sergi Canós	(England) Brentford	Transfer	Undisclosed	
29 August 2023	(Morocco) Selim Amallah	Valladolid	Loan		
1 September 2023	(Ukraine) Roman Yaremchuk	(Belgium) Club Brugge	Loan		

==== Out ====
Date	Player	To	Type	Fee	Ref
26 June 2023	(Spain) Toni Lato	Mallorca	Free		
29 July 2023	(Uruguay) Edinson Cavani	(Argentina) Boca Juniors	Free		
4 August 2023	(United States) Yunus Musah	(Italy) Milan	Transfer	Undisclosed	
8 August 2023	(Uruguay) Facundo González	(Italy) Juventus	Transfer	Undisclosed	
16 August 2023	(Serbia) Uroš Račić	(Italy) Sassuolo	Transfer	Undisclosed	

=== Villarreal ===
==== In ====
Date	Player	From	Type	Fee	Ref
27 June 2023	(Spain) Denis Suárez	Celta Vigo	Free		
29 June 2023	(Spain) Santi Comesaña	Rayo Vallecano	Free		
30 June 2023	(Spain) Ramon Terrats	Girona	Transfer		
4 July 2023	(Chile) Ben Brereton Díaz	(England) Blackburn Rovers	Transfer	Free	
25 July 2023	(Norway) Alexander Sørloth	(Germany) RB Leipzig	Transfer	€10m	
26 July 2023	(Italy) Matteo Gabbia	(Italy) Milan	Loan		

==== Out ====
Date	Player	To	Type	Fee	Ref
20 June 2023	(Spain) Manu Morlanes	Mallorca	Transfer		
1 July 2023	(Senegal) Boulaye Dia	(Italy) Salernitana	Transfer	Undisclosed	
1 July 2023	(Senegal) Nicolas Jackson	(England) Chelsea	Transfer	£32m	
11 July 2023	(Spain) Vicente Iborra	(Greece) Olympiacos	Transfer		
12 July 2023	(Spain) Pau Torres	(England) Aston Villa	Transfer	£31.5m	
22 July 2023	(Spain) Iván Martín	Girona	Loan		
23 July 2023	(Netherlands) Arnaut Danjuma	(England) Everton	Loan		
26 July 2023	(Colombia) Johan Mojica	Osasuna	Loan		
27 July 2023	(Nigeria) Samuel Chukwueze	(Italy) Milan	Transfer	Undisclosed	
1 September 2023	(Spain) Samu Castillejo	(Italy) Sassuolo	Loan		

== Segunda División ==
=== Albacete ===
==== In ====
Date	Player	From	Type	Fee	Ref
4 July 2023	(Spain) Alberto Quiles	Deportivo La Coruña	Transfer	Undisclosed	

==== Out ====
Date	Player	To	Type	Fee	Ref
7 July 2023	(Cameroon) Flavien Enzo Boyomo	Valladolid	Transfer	€1.2m	

=== Alcorcón ===
==== In ====
Date	Player	From	Type	Fee	Ref
25 July 2023	(Spain) Juan Artola	Athletic Bilbao	Loan		

==== Out ====
Date	Player	To	Type	Fee	Ref

=== Amorebieta ===
==== In ====
Date	Player	From	Type	Fee	Ref
4 July 2023	(Spain) Erik Morán	Ponferradina	Transfer	Undisclosed	
4 July 2023	(Spain) Félix Garreta	Real Betis	Loan		
4 July 2023	(Spain) Daniel Lasure	Eibar	Transfer	Free	
23 August 2023	(Spain) Jon Morcillo	Athletic Bilbao	Loan		

==== Out ====
Date	Player	To	Type	Fee	Ref

=== Andorra ===
==== In ====
Date	Player	From	Type	Fee	Ref
24 July 2023	(Spain) Álex Petxarroman	Athletic Bilbao	Transfer	Undisclosed	

==== Out ====
Date	Player	To	Type	Fee	Ref

=== Burgos ===
==== In ====
Date	Player	From	Type	Fee	Ref

==== Out ====
Date	Player	To	Type	Fee	Ref

=== Cartagena ===
==== In ====
Date	Player	From	Type	Fee	Ref
21 July 2023	(Spain) Arnau Solà	Almería	Loan		
29 August 2023	(Portugal) Umaro Embaló	(Netherlands) Fortuna Sittard	Loan		
1 September 2023	(Spain) Jony Rodríguez	(Italy) Lazio	Transfer	Free	

==== Out ====
Date	Player	To	Type	Fee	Ref

=== Eibar ===
==== In ====
Date	Player	From	Type	Fee	Ref
5 August 2023	(Spain) Unai Vencedor	Athletic Bilbao	Loan		
8 August 2023	(United States) Konrad de la Fuente	(France) Marseille	Loan		

==== Out ====
Date	Player	To	Type	Fee	Ref
4 July 2023	(Spain) Daniel Lasure	Amorebieta	Transfer	Free	

=== Elche ===
==== In ====
Date	Player	From	Type	Fee	Ref
7 August 2023	(Argentina) Nicolás Castro	(Belgium) Genk	Loan		
1 September 2023	(Spain) Borja Garcés	Atlético Madrid	Loan		

==== Out ====
Date	Player	To	Type	Fee	Ref

=== Eldense ===
==== In ====
Date	Player	From	Type	Fee	Ref
19 August 2023	(Brazil) Derick Poloni	(Portugal) Casa Pia	Transfer	Undisclosed	
25 August 2023	(Italy) Eddie Salcedo	(Italy) Inter Milan	Loan		

==== Out ====
Date	Player	To	Type	Fee	Ref

=== Espanyol ===
==== In ====
Date	Player	From	Type	Fee	Ref
1 September 2023	(Senegal) Keita Baldé	(Russia) Spartak Moscow	Loan		
1 September 2023	(Spain) Marc Jurado	(England) Manchester United	Transfer	Undisclosed	

==== Out ====
Date	Player	To	Type	Fee	Ref
7 June 2023	(Spain) Víctor Gómez	(Portugal) Braga	Buyout clause	£2m	
1 July 2023	(Spain) Joselu	Real Madrid	Loan		
4 July 2023	(Spain) Aleix Vidal	TBD	End of contract		
25 July 2023	(Italy) Luca Koleosho	(England) Burnley	Transfer	£2.6m	
1 September 2023	(Mexico) César Montes	Almería	Transfer	Undisclosed	

=== Huesca ===
==== In ====
Date	Player	From	Type	Fee	Ref
8 August 2023	(Equatorial Guinea) Álex Balboa	Alavés	Loan		
3 September 2023	(Japan) Kento Hashimoto	(Russia) Rostov	Transfer	Undisclosed	

==== Out ====
Date	Player	To	Type	Fee	Ref

=== Leganés ===
==== In ====
Date	Player	From	Type	Fee	Ref

==== Out ====
Date	Player	To	Type	Fee	Ref

=== Levante ===
==== In ====
Date	Player	From	Type	Fee	Ref
6 July 2023	(Spain) Sergio Lozano	Villarreal B	Transfer	Undisclosed	
14 August 2023	(Spain) Álex Valle	Barcelona	Loan		

==== Out ====
Date	Player	To	Type	Fee	Ref
7 July 2023	(Spain) Son	(Bulgaria) Ludogorets Razgrad	Transfer	€100k	
8 July 2023	(Spain) Pepelu	Valencia	Transfer	€5m	
9 August 2023	(Spain) Marc Pubill	Almería	Transfer	Undisclosed	

=== Mirandés ===
==== In ====
Date	Player	From	Type	Fee	Ref
4 July 2023	(Spain) Sergio Barcia	Celta B	Transfer	Free	
5 July 2023	(Russia) Nikita Iosifov	Villarreal B	Transfer	Undisclosed	
4 August 2023	(Spain) Alan Godoy	Alavés	Loan		
4 August 2023	(Spain) Carlos Martín	Atlético Madrid	Loan		
17 August 2023	(Croatia) Ivan Durdov	(Belgium) Oostende	Loan		
1 September 2023	(Spain) Javier Martón	Athletic Bilbao	Loan		

==== Out ====
Date	Player	To	Type	Fee	Ref

=== Oviedo ===
==== In ====
Date	Player	From	Type	Fee	Ref

==== Out ====
Date	Player	To	Type	Fee	Ref

=== Racing Ferrol ===
==== In ====
Date	Player	From	Type	Fee	Ref
4 July 2023	(Spain) Josep Señé	Lugo	Transfer	Undisclosed	

==== Out ====
Date	Player	To	Type	Fee	Ref

=== Racing Santander ===
==== In ====
Date	Player	From	Type	Fee	Ref

==== Out ====
Date	Player	To	Type	Fee	Ref

=== Sporting Gijón ===
==== In ====
Date	Player	From	Type	Fee	Ref

==== Out ====
Date	Player	To	Type	Fee	Ref
28 July 2023	(Spain) Pol Valentín	(England) Sheffield Wednesday	Transfer	Undisclosed	
3 August 2023	(Spain) Pedro Díaz	(France) Bordeaux	Transfer	Undisclosed	

=== Tenerife ===
==== In ====
Date	Player	From	Type	Fee	Ref

==== Out ====
Date	Player	To	Type	Fee	Ref

=== Valladolid ===
==== In ====
Date	Player	From	Type	Fee	Ref
7 July 2023	(Cameroon) Flavien Enzo Boyomo	Albacete	Transfer	€1.2m	
17 July 2023	(Spain) Raúl Moro	(Italy) Lazio	Loan		
20 August 2023	(Croatia) Stanko Jurić	(Italy) Parma	Loan		
1 September 2023	(Senegal) Mamadou Sylla	Alavés	Transfer	Free	

==== Out ====
Date	Player	To	Type	Fee	Ref
6 August 2023	(Uruguay) Lucas Olaza	(Russia) Krasnodar	Transfer	Undisclosed	

=== Villarreal B ===
==== In ====
Date	Player	From	Type	Fee	Ref

==== Out ====
Date	Player	To	Type	Fee	Ref
5 July 2023	(Russia) Nikita Iosifov	Mirandés	Transfer	Undisclosed	
6 July 2023	(Spain) Sergio Lozano	Levante	Transfer	Undisclosed	

=== Zaragoza ===
==== In ====
Date	Player	From	Type	Fee	Ref
6 July 2023	(Spain) Toni Moya	Free Agent			
27 July 2023	(France) Gaëtan Poussin	(France) Bordeaux	Transfer	Undisclosed	
3 August 2023	(Spain) Víctor Mollejo	Atlético Madrid	Loan		
8 August 2023	(Spain) Germán Valera	Atlético Madrid	Loan		
11 August 2023	(Uruguay) Santiago Mouriño	Atlético Madrid	Loan		

==== Out ====
Date	Player	To	Type	Fee	Ref
3 July 2023	(Spain) Gaizka Larrazabal	(Portugal) Casa Pia	Transfer	Free	
