= 2015–16 Wolverhampton Wanderers F.C. season =

English football club season

Wolverhampton Wanderers
2015–16 season
- Chairman: Steve Morgan
- Head Coach: Kenny Jackett
- Stadium: Molineux
- Championship: 14th
- FA Cup: 3rd Round
- League Cup: 3rd Round
- Top goalscorer: League: Benik Afobe (9); All: Benik Afobe (10)
- Highest home attendance: 25,488 (vs Sheffield Wednesday, 7 May 2016)
- Lowest home attendance: 7,384 (vs Barnet, 25 August 2015)
- Average home league attendance: 20,157
Home colours	Away colours

The 2015–16 season was the 117th season of competitive league football in the history of English football club Wolverhampton Wanderers. The club were competing in the second tier of the English football system, the Football League Championship for a second consecutive year having finished 7th in the previous season following their promotion from League One.

The club ended the campaign in 14th position, one of their lowest finishes during the previous 25 years, having failed to compete for the play-offs. The season saw owner Steve Morgan resign as chairman and place the club up for sale but no sale has to date been concluded. Supporter unrest was strengthened further when Benik Afobe, who ended as the team's leading goalscorer, was sold during the January transfer window to Premier League Bournemouth.

== Competitions ==
=== Pre-season ===
8 July 2015 Friendly	Chambly	2–3	Wolverhampton Wanderers	Clairefontaine-en-Yvelines, France
15:00 CEST	Ouédraogo 21'; Nzuzi Mata 78'	Report	Jacobs 32'; Afobe 45+1'; Enobakhare 89'	Stadium: INF Clairefontaine; Attendance: 250

10 July 2015 Friendly	Paris FC	0–1	Wolverhampton Wanderers	Clairefontaine-en-Yvelines, France
15:00 CEST		Report	Wilson 84'	Stadium: INF Clairefontaine

18 July 2015 Friendly	Burton Albion	0–1	Wolverhampton Wanderers	Burton upon Trent
13:00 BST		Report	Dicko 10'	Stadium: Pirelli Stadium; Attendance: 2,702; Referee: Darren Deadman

25 July 2015 Friendly	Shrewsbury Town	1–1	Wolverhampton Wanderers	Shrewsbury
15:00 BST	Barnett 34'	Report	Dicko 10'	Stadium: Greenhous Meadow; Attendance: 3,604 (1,499 away); Referee: Oliver Langford

28 July 2015 Friendly	Wolverhampton Wanderers	2–2	Aston Villa	Wolverhampton
19:45 BST	Edwards 72'; Afobe 89'	Report	Kozák 6', 76'	Stadium: Molineux; Attendance: 22,070 (3,897 away); Referee: Craig Pawson

1 August 2015 Friendly	Doncaster Rovers	3–4	Wolverhampton Wanderers	Doncaster
15:00 BST	Butler 20'; Jones 45'; Tyson 47'	Report	Afobe 21'; Graham 29'; Hause 36'; Enobakhare 63'	Stadium: Keepmoat Stadium; Attendance: 2,147 (588 away); Referee: Andy Madley

=== Football League Championship ===
A total of 24 teams competed in the Football League Championship in the 2015–16 season. Each team played every other team twice, once at their stadium, and once at the opposition's. Three points were awarded to teams for each win, one point per draw, and none for defeats.

The provisional fixture list was released on 17 June 2015, but was subject to change in the event of matches being selected for television coverage or police concerns.

8 August 2015 1	Blackburn Rovers	1–2	Wolverhampton Wanderers	Blackburn
15:00 BST	Conway 39'	Report	Afobe 29'; Edwards 45'	Stadium: Ewood Park; Attendance: 16,159 (3,596 away fans); Referee: Mark Haywood

16 August 2015 2	Wolverhampton Wanderers	1–1	Hull City	Wolverhampton
12:00 BST	Henry 58'	Report	Jelavić 22' (pen.)	Stadium: Molineux; Attendance: 20,062 (535 away fans); Referee: Andre Marriner

19 August 2015 3	Wolverhampton Wanderers	2–3	Queens Park Rangers	Wolverhampton
19:45 BST	Afobe 17'; McDonald 24'	Report	Austin 38'; Phillips 52', 72'	Stadium: Molineux; Attendance: 21,032 (594 away fans); Referee: Peter Bankes

22 August 2015 4	Cardiff City	2–0	Wolverhampton Wanderers	Cardiff
17:15 BST	Jones 44'; Ameobi 60'	Report		Stadium: Cardiff City Stadium; Attendance: 14,820 (1,030 away fans); Referee: Andy Davies

29 August 2015 5	Wolverhampton Wanderers	2–1	Charlton Athletic	Wolverhampton
15:00 BST	Edwards 65'; Le Fondre 85'	Report	Guðmundsson 55'	Stadium: Molineux; Attendance: 19,583 (698 away fans); Referee: Chris Kavanagh

12 September 2015 6	Bolton Wanderers	2–1	Wolverhampton Wanderers	Horwich
15:00 BST	Feeney 17'; Clough 45+1' (pen.)	Report	Afobe 68' (pen.)	Stadium: Macron Stadium; Attendance: 14,698 (1,845 away fans); Referee: Scott Duncan

19 September 2015 7	Wolverhampton Wanderers	0–0	Brighton & Hove Albion	Wolverhampton
15:00 BST		Report	Hemed (penalty missed) 23'	Stadium: Molineux; Attendance: 20,382 (1,084 away fans); Referee: Jeremy Simpson

26 September 2015 8	Preston North End	1–1	Wolverhampton Wanderers	Preston
15:00 BST	Johnson 10'	Report	McDonald 90+1'	Stadium: Deepdale; Attendance: 13,049 (2,477 away fans); Referee: Trevor Kettle

29 September 2015 9	Fulham	0–3	Wolverhampton Wanderers	London
19:45 BST		Report	Le Fondre 56'; Ojo 59'; Henry 78'	Stadium: Craven Cottage; Attendance: 14,838 (1,377 away fans); Referee: Darren Drysdale

3 October 2015 10	Wolverhampton Wanderers	3–0	Huddersfield Town	Wolverhampton
12:30 BST	McDonald 23'; Afobe 66', 88'	Report		Stadium: Molineux; Attendance: 18,166 (409 away fans); Referee: Chris Kavanagh

18 October 2015 11	Derby County	4–2	Wolverhampton Wanderers	Derby
13:15 BST	Martin 3', 28' (penalty missed) 45+3'; Johnson 45+3'; Russell 57'	Report	Afobe 19'; Le Fondre 64'	Stadium: iPro Stadium; Attendance: 29,063 (1,391 away fans); Referee: Andy Madley

21 October 2015 12	Wolverhampton Wanderers	0–2	Brentford	Wolverhampton
19:45 BST		Report	Djuricin 17'; Hofmann 88'	Stadium: Molineux; Attendance: 18,167 (227 away fans); Referee: Paul Tierney

24 October 2015 13	Wolverhampton Wanderers	1–3	Middlesbrough	Wolverhampton
15:00 BST	Edwards 22'	Report	Fabbrini 71'; Leadbitter 82' (pen.); Downing 90+2'	Stadium: Molineux; Attendance: 22,006 (1,835 away fans); Referee: James Linington

31 October 2015 14	Birmingham City	0–2	Wolverhampton Wanderers	Birmingham
12:30 GMT		Report	Edwards 11'; Ojo 84'	Stadium: St Andrew's; Attendance: 18,946 (2,064 away fans); Referee: Peter Bankes

3 November 2015 15	Bristol City	1–0	Wolverhampton Wanderers	Bristol
19:45 GMT	Kodjia 45'	Report		Stadium: Ashton Gate; Attendance: 15,517 (1,173 away fans); Referee: Simon Hooper

7 November 2015 16	Wolverhampton Wanderers	0–0	Burnley	Wolverhampton
15:00 GMT		Report		Stadium: Molineux; Attendance: 20,684 (1,572 away fans); Referee: Jon Moss

21 November 2015 17	Ipswich Town	2–2	Wolverhampton Wanderers	Ipswich
15:00 GMT	Douglas 16'; Murphy 54'	Report	Henry 38'; Afobe 75'	Stadium: Portman Road; Attendance: 19,227 (996 away fans); Referee: Gavin Ward

28 November 2015 18	Wolverhampton Wanderers	0–0	Milton Keynes Dons	Wolverhampton
15:00 GMT		Report		Stadium: Molineux; Attendance: 19,814 (617 away fans); Referee: Nigel Miller

5 December 2015 19	Rotherham United	1–2	Wolverhampton Wanderers	Rotherham
15:00 GMT	Newell 18'	Report	Henry 5'; Batth 44'	Stadium: AESSEAL New York Stadium; Attendance: 9,759 (1,752 away fans); Referee: Darren Deadman

11 December 2015 20	Wolverhampton Wanderers	1–1	Nottingham Forest	Wolverhampton
19:45 GMT	Ebanks-Landell 15'	Report	Blackstock 80'	Stadium: Molineux; Attendance: 20,000 (857 away fans); Referee: Keith Stroud

17 December 2015 21	Wolverhampton Wanderers	2–3	Leeds United	Wolverhampton
19:45 GMT	Afobe 10'; Byrne 81'	Report	Byram 44', 60'; Dallas 51'	Stadium: Molineux; Attendance: 19,592 (1,693 away fans); Referee: Stuart Attwell

20 December 2015 22	Sheffield Wednesday	4–1	Wolverhampton Wanderers	Sheffield
14:00 GMT	Forestieri 20' (pen.), 25'; Pudil 59'; Hooper 90'	Report	Afobe 16' (pen.)	Stadium: Hillsborough; Attendance: 19,529 (907 away fans); Referee: Dean Whitestone

26 December 2015 22	Wolverhampton Wanderers	1–0	Reading	Wolverhampton
17:15 GMT	Henry 18'	Report		Stadium: Molineux; Attendance: 21,147 (598 away fans); Referee: Simon Hooper

28 December 2015 24	Charlton Athletic	0–2	Wolverhampton Wanderers	London
15:00 GMT		Report	Graham 52'; Lennon 83' (o.g.)	Stadium: The Valley; Attendance: 18,059 (1,881 away fans); Referee: Keith Hill

1 January 2016 25	Brighton & Hove Albion	0–1	Wolverhampton Wanderers	Brighton
12:30 GMT		Report	Goldson 32' (o.g.)	Stadium: AMEX Stadium; Attendance: 26,321 (839 away fans); Referee: Chris Kavanagh

12 January 2016 26	Wolverhampton Wanderers	3–2	Fulham	Wolverhampton
19:45 GMT	Żyro 6', 13'; Doherty 48'	Report	Christensen 24'; McCormack 74'	Stadium: Molineux; Attendance: 17,387 (163 away fans); Referee: Robert Lewis

16 January 2016 27	Wolverhampton Wanderers	1–3	Cardiff City	Wolverhampton
15:00 GMT	Żyro 40'	Report	Noone 28', 36'; Ralls 48'	Stadium: Molineux; Attendance: 24,238 (1,057 away fans); Referee: Dean Whitestone

23 January 2016 28	Queens Park Rangers	1–1	Wolverhampton Wanderers	London
12:30 GMT	Polter 2'	Report	Henry 48'	Stadium: Loftus Road; Attendance: 15,266 (1,356 away fans); Referee: Andy Woolmer

2 February 2016 29	Wolverhampton Wanderers	2–2	Bolton Wanderers	Wolverhampton
19:45 GMT	Mason 3'; Henry 77'	Report	Wellington 81'; Dobbie 89'	Stadium: Molineux; Attendance: 17,825 (306 away fans); Referee: Fred Graham

6 February 2016 30	Reading	0–0	Wolverhampton Wanderers	Reading
15:00 GMT		Report		Stadium: Madejski Stadium; Attendance: 17,771 (1,805 away fans); Referee: Tony Harrington

13 February 2016 31	Wolverhampton Wanderers	1–2	Preston North End	Wolverhampton
15:00 GMT	Mason 66'	Report	Gallagher 17'; Reach 53'	Stadium: Molineux; Attendance: 21,204 (1,504 away fans); Referee: Kevin Johnson

20 February 2016 32	Huddersfield Town	1–0	Wolverhampton Wanderers	Huddersfield
15:00 GMT	Wells 78'	Report		Stadium: John Smith's Stadium; Attendance: 12,714 (1,476 away fans); Referee: Kevin Wright

23 February 2016 33	Brentford	3–0	Wolverhampton Wanderers	London
19:45 GMT	Swift 38', 67'; Canós 56'	Report		Stadium: Griffin Park; Attendance: 8,769 (938 away fans); Referee: Charles Breakspear

27 February 2016 34	Wolverhampton Wanderers	2–1	Derby County	Wolverhampton
12:30 GMT	Saville 14', 86'	Report	Martin 44'	Stadium: Molineux; Attendance: 19,389 (1,714 away fans); Referee: Graham Scott

4 March 2016 35	Middlesbrough	2–1	Wolverhampton Wanderers	Middlesbrough
19:45 GMT	Ramírez 24', 56'	Report	Gibson 89' (o.g.)	Stadium: Riverside Stadium; Attendance: 22,110 (291 away fans); Referee: Stuart Attwell

8 March 2016 36	Wolverhampton Wanderers	2–1	Bristol City	Wolverhampton
19:45 GMT	Byrne 47'; Doherty 90+4'	Report	Flint 77'	Stadium: Molineux; Attendance: 17,459 (718 away fans); Referee: Scott Duncan

13 March 2016 37	Wolverhampton Wanderers	0–0	Birmingham City	Wolverhampton
13:15 GMT		Report		Stadium: Molineux; Attendance: 21,464 (2,562 away fans); Referee: Darren Drysdale

19 March 2016 38	Burnley	1–1	Wolverhampton Wanderers	Burnley
15:00 GMT	Vokes 68'	Report	Batth 90+2'	Stadium: Turf Moor; Attendance: 17,411 (1,091 away fans); Referee: Fred Graham

2 April 2016 39	Wolverhampton Wanderers	0–0	Ipswich Town	Wolverhampton
15:00 BST		Report		Stadium: Molineux; Attendance: 20,225 (1,154 away fans); Referee: Robert Lewis

5 April 2016 40	Milton Keynes Dons	1–2	Wolverhampton Wanderers	Milton Keynes
19:45 BST	Hause 6' (o.g.)	Report	Saville 62'; Price 66'	Stadium: Stadium mk Attendance: 12,131 (1,653 away fans); Referee: Mark Heywood

9 April 2016 41	Wolverhampton Wanderers	0–0	Blackburn Rovers	Wolverhampton
15:00 BST		Report		Stadium: Molineux; Attendance: 19,538 (726 away fans); Referee: Mark Brown

15 April 2016 42	Hull City	2–1	Wolverhampton Wanderers	Kingston upon Hull
19:45 BST	Diomande 5'; Ikeme 90+3' (o.g.)	Report	Edwards 19'	Stadium: KC Stadium; Attendance: 15,504 (365 away fans); Referee: James Adcock

19 April 2016 43	Leeds United	2–1	Wolverhampton Wanderers	Leeds
19:45 BST	Bamba 60'; Diagouraga 64'	Report	Saville 77'	Stadium: Elland Road; Attendance: 17,694 (478 away fans); Referee: David Coote

23 April 2016 44	Wolverhampton Wanderers	0–0	Rotherham United	Wolverhampton
15:00 BST		Report		Stadium: Molineux; Attendance: 18,757 (668 away fans); Referee: Jeremy Simpson

30 April 2016 45	Nottingham Forest	1–1	Wolverhampton Wanderers	Nottingham
15:00 BST	Gardner 68'	Report	Mason 58'	Stadium: City Ground; Attendance: 22,291 (1,935 away fans); Referee: Iain Williamson

7 May 2016 46	Wolverhampton Wanderers	2–1	Sheffield Wednesday	Wolverhampton
12:30 BST	Turner 7' (o.g.); Saville 35'	Report	McGugan 90' (pen.)	Stadium: Molineux; Attendance: 25,488 (4,374 away fans); Referee: Darren Bond

==== Results summary ====
Overall								Home						Away					
Pld	W	D	L	GF	GA	GD	Pts	W	D	L	GF	GA	GD	W	D	L	GF	GA	GD
46	14	16	16	53	58	−5	58	7	10	6	26	26	0	7	6	10	27	32	−5

Source: Statto.com

==== Results by round ====
Round	1	2	3	4	5	6	7	8	9	10	11	12	13	14	15	16	17	18	19	20	21	22	23	24	25	26	27	28	29	30	31	32	33	34	35	36	37	38	39	40	41	42	43	44	45	46
Ground	A	H	H	A	H	A	H	A	A	H	A	H	H	A	A	H	A	H	A	H	H	A	H	A	A	H	H	A	H	A	H	A	A	H	A	H	H	A	H	A	H	A	A	H	A	H
Result	W	D	L	L	W	L	D	D	W	W	L	L	L	W	L	D	D	D	W	D	L	L	W	W	W	W	L	D	D	D	L	L	L	W	L	W	D	D	D	W	D	L	L	D	D	W
Position	6	8	11	17	12	15	18	16	10	9	11	12	14	13	14	14	14	15	14	14	17	17	16	11	11	10	10	12	12	11	12	13	15	13	14	12	12	12	12	12	12	12	14	14	14	14

Source: Statto.com
A = Away; H = Home; W = Win; D = Draw; L = Loss

==== League table ====
Pos	Team	Pld	W	D	L	GF	GA	GD	Pts
12	Queens Park Rangers	46	14	18	14	54	54	0	60
13	Leeds United	46	14	17	15	50	58	−8	59
14	Wolverhampton Wanderers	46	14	16	16	53	58	−5	58
15	Blackburn Rovers	46	13	16	17	46	46	0	55
16	Nottingham Forest	46	13	16	17	43	47	−4	55

Source: BBC Sport
Rules for classification: 1) Points; 2) Goal difference; 3) Number of goals scored

=== FA Cup ===
9 January 2016 R3	West Ham United	1–0	Wolverhampton Wanderers	London
15:00 GMT	Jelavić 84'	Report		Stadium: Upton Park; Attendance: 34,547 (3,013 away fans); Referee: Anthony Taylor

=== League Cup ===
11 August 2015 R1	Wolverhampton Wanderers	2–1	Newport County	Wolverhampton
19:45 BST	Dicko 16'; Afobe 58' (pen.)	Report	Boden 6'	Stadium: Molineux; Attendance: 9,586 (613 away fans); Referee: Darren Bond

25 August 2015 R2	Wolverhampton Wanderers	2–1	Barnet	Wolverhampton
19:45 BST	Enobakhare 3'; Ojo 58'	Report	Dembélé 76'	Stadium: Molineux; Attendance: 7,384 (223 away fans); Referee: Mark Heywood

22 September 2015 R3	Middlesbrough	3–0	Wolverhampton Wanderers	Middlesbrough
19:45 BST	Adomah 37', 64'; Fabbrini 57'	Report		Stadium: Riverside Stadium; Attendance: 13,368 (312 away fans); Referee: Kevin Wright

== Players ==
=== Statistics ===
Key:
‡ On loan from another club * First appearance(s) for the club

- # = Squad number
- Pos = Playing position
- P = Number of games played
- G = Number of goals scored
- GK = Goalkeeper
- DF = Defender
- MF = Midfielder
- FW = Forward
- = Yellow cards
- = Red cards
- † Permanent player left club during the season
- ¤ Loaned to another club for part or all of season

Correct as of end of season. Starting appearances are listed first, followed by substitute appearances in parentheses where applicable.

No.	Pos	Name	P	G	P	G	P	G	P	G	A yellow card	A red card	Notes
No.	Pos	Name	League		FA Cup		League Cup		Total		Discipline		Notes
1	GK	(Nigeria) Carl Ikeme	32(1)	0	1	0	1	0	34(1)	0	0	0	
2	DF	(Republic of Ireland) Matt Doherty	27(5)	2	1	0	3	0	31(5)	2	1	0	
3	DF	(England) Scott Golbourne †	20	0	0	0	1	0	20	0	0	0	
3	MF	(France) Jérémy Hélan ‡	8	0	0	0	0	0	8	0	0	0	
4	MF	(Wales) David Edwards	25(3)	5	1	0	0	0	26(3)	5	1	0	
5	DF	(England) Richard Stearman †	4	0	0	0	0	0	4	0	0	0	
5	DF	(England) Mike Williamson ‡	4	0	0	0	0	0	4	0	0	0	
6	DF	(England) Danny Batth	36	2	1	0	0	0	37	2	2	0	
7	MF	(England) James Henry	32(6)	7	0(1)	0	0(2)	0	32(9)	7	2	0	
8	MF	(England) George Saville ¤	16(2)	5	0	0	2	0	18(2)	5	6	0	
9	FW	(Mali) Nouha Dicko	4(1)	0	0	0	1	1	5(1)	1	0	0	
10	FW	(Democratic Republic of the Congo) Benik Afobe †	22(2)	9	0	0	1(1)	1	23(3)	10	1	0	
10	FW	(Republic of Ireland) Joe Mason	8(7)	3	0	0	0	0	8(7)	3	0	0	
11	MF	(Scotland) Kevin McDonald	30(1)	3	1	0	1	0	32(1)	3	9	0	
12	MF	(England) Jed Wallace ¤	6(3)	0	0	0	2	0	8(3)	0	0	0	
13	GK	(Republic of Ireland) Aaron McCarey ¤	0	0	0	0	0	0	0	0	0	0	
14	MF	(Wales) Lee Evans ¤	0	0	0	0	0	0	0	0	0	0	
15	MF	(England) Tommy Rowe ¤	2(1)	0	0	0	0(1)	0	2(2)	0	0	0	
16	MF	(England) Conor Coady	31(4)	0	1	0	1	0	33(4)	0	5	1	
17	MF	(Netherlands) Rajiv van La Parra ¤	10(2)	0	1	0	1(1)	0	12(3)	0	1	0	
18	DF	(England) Dominic Iorfa	41	0	1	0	2(1)	0	44(1)	0	10	0	
19	MF	(England) Jack Price	21(3)	1	0	0	3	0	24(3)	1	3	0	
20	MF	(England) Sheyi Ojo ‡	5(11)	2	0	0	2	1	7(12)	3	4	0	
22	MF	(Iceland) Björn Sigurðarson	10(3)	0	1	0	0	0	11(3)	0	1	0	
23	DF	(England) Ethan Ebanks-Landell	21	1	1	0	3	0	25	1	2	0	
24	MF	(England) Jordan Graham ¤	11	1	0(1)	0	0	0	11(1)	1	0	0	
25	MF	(England) Nathan Byrne	8(14)	2	0	0	0	0	8(14)	2	0	0	
26	GK	(Argentina) Emiliano Martínez ‡	13	0	0	0	2	0	15	0	0	0	
27	FW	(England) Grant Holt ‡	0(3)	0	0	0	0	0	0(3)	0	0	0	
27	FW	(Poland) Michał Żyro	5(2)	3	1	0	0	0	6(2)	3	0	0	
28	DF	(France) Sylvain Deslandes	3	0	0	0	2	0	5	0	0	0	
29	FW	(England) Adam Le Fondre ‡	10(14)	3	0(1)	0	1(2)	0	11(17)	3	2	0	
30	DF	(England) Kortney Hause	23(1)	0	0	0	2	0	25(1)	0	1	0	
31	GK	(England) Jonathan Flatt	0	0	0	0	0	0	0	0	0	0	
33	FW	(Wales) Bradley Reid	0	0	0	0	0	0	0	0	0	0	
35	MF	(England) Connor Hunte	0(2)	0	0	0	0	0	0(2)	0	0	0	
39	FW	(Wales) Aaron Collins	0	0	0	0	0	0	0	0	0	0	
43	MF	(England) Connor Ronan	0	0	0	0	0	0	0	0	0	0	
48	FW	(Nigeria) Bright Enobakhare	1(6)	0	0	0	2	1	3(6)	1	2	0	
50	DF	(England) Aaron Hayden	0	0	0	0	0	0	0	0	0	0	

=== Awards ===
Award	Winner
Fans' Player of the Season	Matt Doherty
Players' Player of the Season	Matt Doherty
Young Player of the Season	Dominic Iorfa
Academy Player of the Season	Connor Ronan
Goal of the Season	Matt Doherty (vs Fulham, 12 January 2016)

== Transfers ==
=== Transfers in ===
Date	Player	From	Fee
21 May 2015	(England) Jed Wallace	(England) Portsmouth	£275,000
10 June 2015	(France) Sylvain Deslandes	(France) SM Caen	Free
1 July 2015	(England) Cameron John	(England) Southend United	Free
1 July 2015	(Republic of Ireland) Daniel McKenna	(Republic of Ireland) Belvedere	Free
1 July 2015	(England) Michael Sibley	(England) Nike Academy	Free
3 July 2015	(England) Conor Coady	(England) Huddersfield Town	£2,000,000
1 September 2015	(England) Nathan Byrne	(England) Swindon Town	£1,000,000
2 January 2016	(Poland) Michał Żyro	(Poland) Legia Warsaw	£350,000
22 January 2016	(Wales) Aaron Collins	(Wales) Newport County	£75,000
28 January 2016	(Republic of Ireland) Joe Mason	(Wales) Cardiff City	£3,000,000
29 January 2016	(England) Mike Williamson	(England) Newcastle United	£250,000

=== Loans in ===
Date from	Player	From	Date until
3 August 2015	(England) Adam Le Fondre	(Wales) Cardiff City	End of season
4 August 2015	(England) Sheyi Ojo	(England) Liverpool	7 January 2016
11 August 2015	(Argentina) Emiliano Martínez	(England) Arsenal	End of season
29 October 2015	(England) Mike Williamson	(England) Newcastle United	1 December 2015
30 October 2015	(England) Grant Holt	(England) Wigan Athletic	2 January 2016
25 February 2016	(France) Jérémy Hélan	(England) Sheffield Wednesday	21 April 2016

=== Transfers out ===
Date	Player	To	Fee
6 May 2015	(Republic of Ireland) Kevin Doyle	(United States) Colorado Rapids (Note: Early settlement agreed to allow Doyle to join Colorado Rapids.)	Free
2 June 2015	(England) Leon Clarke	(England) Bury	Free
11 June 2015	(England) George Swan	(England) York City	Free
23 June 2015	(Wales) Jake Cassidy	(England) Oldham Athletic	Free
30 June 2015	(Poland) Tomasz Kuszczak	Released (Note: Kuszczak subsequently joined Birmingham City on 1 July.)	Free
30 June 2015	(Wales) Sam Ricketts	Released (Note: Ricketts subsequently joined Coventry City on 6 July.)	Free
30 June 2015	(Mali) Bakary Sako	Released (Note: Sako subsequently joined Crystal Palace on 5 August.)	Free
1 July 2015	(France) Ibrahim Keita	(Slovakia) Košice	Free
1 July 2015	(England) Charlie Morris	(England) Boldmere St. Michaels	Free
13 July 2015	(Romania) Carlo Erdei	(Romania) Pandurii	Free
13 July 2015	(Spain) Albert Torras	(Spain) Málaga B	Free
24 July 2015	(Spain) Jordi Ortega	(Spain) Córdoba	Free
27 July 2015	(England) Michael Jacobs	(England) Wigan Athletic	Undisclosed
4 August 2015	(Austria) Georg Margreitter	Released (Note: Margreitter subsequently joined FC Nürnberg on 24 August.)	Free
1 September 2015	(England) Richard Stearman	(England) Fulham	£2,000,000
10 January 2016	(Democratic Republic of the Congo) Benik Afobe	(England) Bournemouth	£10,000,000
28 January 2016	(England) Scott Golbourne	(England) Bristol City	Undisclosed
1 February 2016	(England) Mekhi Leacock-McLeod	(Scotland) Rangers	Free
27 February 2016	(Republic of Ireland) Jesse Devers	(Republic of Ireland) Galway United	Free

=== Loans out ===
Date from	Player	To	Date until
9 July 2015	(Republic of Ireland) Liam McAlinden	(England) Shrewsbury Town	9 January 2016
29 July 2015	(England) Zeli Ismail	(England) Burton Albion	29 January 2016
6 August 2015	(England) Aaron Hayden	(Wales) Newport County	16 September 2015
20 August 2015	(Wales) Lee Evans	(England) Bradford City	End of season
18 September 2015	(England) Harry Burgoyne	(England) Lowestoft Town	23 October 2015
23 September 2015	(Republic of Ireland) Aaron McCarey	(England) Portsmouth	23 October 2015
28 September 2015	(England) Jordan Graham	(England) Oxford United	27 October 2015
2 October 2015	(England) Tommy Rowe	(England) Scunthorpe United	29 December 2015
6 October 2015	(England) George Saville	(England) Millwall	6 January 2016
24 October 2015	(Republic of Ireland) Aaron McCarey	(England) Bury	28 October 2015
13 November 2015	(England) Harry Burgoyne	(England) Corby Town	13 December 2015
26 November 2015	(Netherlands) Rajiv van La Parra	(England) Brighton	2 January 2016
27 December 2015	(England) Harry Burgoyne	(England) Telford United	End of season
8 January 2016	(England) Jed Wallace	(England) Millwall	16 March 2016
12 January 2016	(Guinea-Bissau) Eusébio Bancessi	(England) Telford United	End of season
1 February 2016	(England) Zeli Ismail	(England) Oxford United	28 February 2016
4 March 2016	(England) Ashley Carter	(England) Tamworth	End of season
5 March 2016	(England) Zeli Ismail	(England) Cambridge United	End of season
8 March 2016	(Zimbabwe) Tendai Matinyadze	(England) Rushall Olympic	End of season
10 March 2016	(Republic of Ireland) Liam McAlinden	(England) Crawley Town	End of season
11 March 2016	(Netherlands) Rajiv van La Parra	(England) Huddersfield	End of season
19 March 2016	(England) Tommy Rowe	(England) Doncaster Rovers	End of season
24 March 2016	(England) Ben O'Hanlon	(England) Corby Town	End of season
