= Diego Rosales =

Diego Rosales may refer to:

- Diego Rosales (Mexican footballer) (born 1998), Mexican football defender
- Diego Rosales (Spanish footballer) (born 2003), Spanish football defender
- Diego Rosales (soccer) (born 2005), American soccer player
