= Sergio Gabriel =

Spanish footballer (born 2003)

Personal information
- Full name: Sergio Gabriel de la Vara
- Date of birth: 8 May 2003 (age 23)
- Place of birth: Madrid, Spain
- Position: Winger

Team information
- Current team: Mirandés B
- Number: 11

Youth career
- Rayo Vallecano
- 2019–2022: Getafe

Senior career*
Years	Team	Apps	(Gls)
2022–2023	Azuqueca	4	(0)
2023	Complutense	12	(1)
2023–	Mirandés B	56	(5)
2024–	Mirandés	1	(0)
- * Club domestic league appearances and goals as of 11 May 2025

Sergio Gabriel de la Vara (born 8 May 2003), known as Sergio Gabriel or sometimes as just Gabri, is a Spanish footballer who plays mainly as a right winger for CD Mirandés B.

== Career ==
Born in Madrid, Sergio Gabriel represented Rayo Vallecano and Getafe CF as a youth. On 4 July 2022, after finishing his formation, he moved to Tercera Federación side CD Azuqueca.

Sergio Gabriel made his senior debut on 9 October 2022, playing the last 17 minutes of a 3–1 home win over UB Conquense. The following January, after being rarely used, he returned to his native region and joined AD Complutense in the Preferente de Madrid, scoring his first senior goal on 16 April 2023, but in a 2–1 loss at Aravaca CF.

In July 2023, Sergio Gabriel signed for CD Mirandés and was initially assigned to the reserves in the fifth division. He spent the 2024 pre-season with the main squad, and made his professional debut on 16 August, coming on as a second-half substitute for Tachi but being himself replaced by fellow debutant Asier Ortiz de Guinea due to an injury in a 1–0 Segunda División home win over Córdoba CF.
