= Moussa Traoré (footballer, born 1995) =

Guinean footballer

Personal information
- Date of birth: 8 May 1995 (age 31)
- Place of birth: Conakry, Guinea
- Height: 1.84 m (6 ft 0 in)
- Position: Goalkeeper

Youth career
- 2003–2014: Aurrerá Vitoria

Senior career*
Years	Team	Apps	(Gls)
2014–2015	Ariznabarra		
2015–2018	Mirandés B	75	(0)
2019	Vitoria	0	(0)
2019–2020	Arouca	0	(0)

International career^{‡}
2017	Guinea	2	(0)
- * Club domestic league appearances and goals as of 23 November 2019 ‡ National team caps and goals as of 24 March 2018

Moussa Traoré (born on 8 May 1995) is a Guinean footballer who plays as a goalkeeper. Since 2020 he has had no club.

== Club career ==
Born in Conakry, Traoré moved to Vitoria-Gasteiz at the age of eight and started playing for CD Aurrerá de Vitoria. He made his senior debut with CD Ariznabarra in the 2014–15 campaign, in the regional leagues, before joining CD Mirandés and being assigned to the reserves in 2015.

In January 2019, Traoré joined another reserve team, CD Vitoria in Segunda División B, but failed to make an appearance for the side. On 18 July 2019, he was announced at Campeonato de Portugal side F.C. Arouca.

== International career ==
Traoré was first called up for the Guinea national team on 26 October 2017, ahead of a 2018 FIFA World Cup qualifiers against DR Congo. He made his full international debut on 11 November, starting in the 1–3 away loss at the Stade des Martyrs in Kinshasa.
