= Ekhiotz Orobio =

Spanish footballer

Personal information
- Full name: Ekhiotz Orobiogoikoetxea López
- Date of birth: 5 May 2002 (age 24)
- Place of birth: Vitoria-Gasteiz, Spain
- Height: 1.82 m (6 ft 0 in)
- Position: Forward

Team information
- Current team: Malacitano
- Number: 21

Youth career
- Alavés

Senior career*
| Years | Team | Apps | (Gls) |
| 2020–2021 | Alavés B | 9 | (4) |
| 2021–2022 | San Ignacio | 10 | (0) |
| 2022–2023 | Peña Balsamaiso | 15 | (3) |
| 2022 | Logroñés | 1 | (0) |
| 2023 | Portugalete | 12 | (1) |
| 2023–2024 | Mirandés B | 27 | (2) |
| 2023–2024 | Mirandés | 1 | (0) |
| 2024–2025 | Estepona | 28 | (0) |
| 2025– | Malacitano | 2 | (0) |
- * Club domestic league appearances and goals as of 28 September 2025

Ekhiotz Orobiogoikoetxea López (born 5 May 2002), known as Ekhiotz Orobio or just Orobio, is a Spanish footballer who plays as a forward for Segunda Federación club Malacitano.

== Career ==
Born in Vitoria-Gasteiz, Álava, Basque Country, Orobio was a Deportivo Alavés youth product. He made his senior debut with the reserves on 13 December 2020, coming on as a late substitute and being sent off in a 3–0 Segunda División B home win over CD Laredo.

Orobio scored his first senior goals on 21 March 2021, netting a hat-trick for the B's in a 3–1 home win over Barakaldo CF. For the 2021–22 season, he was assigned to farm team Club San Ignacio in Tercera División RFEF.

On 14 July 2022, Orobio joined SD Logroñés' farm team Peña Balsamaiso CF also in the fifth division. The following 31 January, he moved to fellow league team Club Portugalete.

On 3 July 2023, Orobio moved to CD Mirandés and was assigned to the B-team also in division five. He made his professional debut on 14 August, replacing Alan Godoy late into a 4–0 Segunda División home routing of AD Alcorcón.
