= Steve Aldo One =

Cameroonian footballer

Steve One
Personal information
- Full name: Steve Aldo One
- Date of birth: 5 January 1995 (age 31)
- Place of birth: Yaoundé, Cameroon
- Height: 1.83 m (6 ft 0 in)
- Position: Centre back

Team information
- Current team: Atlètic Lleida
- Number: 24

Youth career
- Mallorca

Senior career*
| Years | Team | Apps | (Gls) |
| 2012–2017 | Mallorca B | 96 | (6) |
| 2017–2019 | Deportivo B | 59 | (0) |
| 2017–2019 | Deportivo La Coruña | 1 | (0) |
| 2019–2020 | Salamanca | 17 | (0) |
| 2020–2021 | L'Hospitalet | 18 | (0) |
| 2021–2022 | Prat | 13 | (0) |
| 2022–2025 | L'Hospitalet | 67 | (2) |
| 2025– | Atlètic Lleida | 14 | (0) |
- * Club domestic league appearances and goals as of 15 May 2026

Steve Aldo One (born 5 January 1995) is a Cameroonian footballer who plays as a central defender for Spanish Segunda Federación club Atlètic Lleida.

== Club career ==
Born in Yaoundé, One moved to Spain at the age of ten and represented RCD Mallorca as a youth. He made his senior debut with the reserves on 16 December 2012, starting in a 0–1 Segunda División B away loss against UE Sant Andreu.

One scored his first senior goal on 12 October 2014, netting his team's third in a 4–2 away defeat of Real Zaragoza B. In February 2016, he suffered a severe knee injury which took him out for seven months.

On 7 July 2017, One moved to another reserve team, Deportivo Fabril also in the third division. He made his first team debut on 29 November, starting in a 3–2 win at UD Las Palmas for the season's Copa del Rey.

One made his La Liga debut on 21 January 2018, starting in a 1–7 away loss against Real Madrid.
