= Nacho Castillo =

Spanish footballer

Personal information
- Full name: Ignacio Castillo Ameyugo
- Date of birth: 3 July 2000 (age 26)
- Place of birth: Miranda de Ebro, Spain
- Height: 1.83 m (6 ft 0 in)
- Position: Midfielder

Team information
- Current team: Ourense
- Number: 6

Youth career
- Alavés

Senior career*
Years	Team	Apps	(Gls)
2019	Alavés B	1	(0)
2019–2021	San Ignacio	38	(2)
2021–2022	Alavés B	27	(2)
2022–2023	Mirandés B	21	(8)
2022–2023	Mirandés	6	(0)
2023–2024	Teruel	38	(2)
2024–2025	Ponferradina	0	(0)
2025–	Ourense	28	(6)
- * Club domestic league appearances and goals as of 10 June 2026

Ignacio "Nacho" Castillo Ameyugo (born 3 July 2000) is a Spanish professional footballer who plays as a midfielder for Primera Federación club Ourense.

== Club career ==
Castillo was born in Miranda de Ebro, Burgos, Castile and León, and was a Deportivo Alavés youth graduate. He made his senior debut with the reserves on 31 March 2019, starting in a 2–0 Tercera División home win over Club Portugalete.

In July 2019, Castillo was sent to Alavés' partner team Club San Ignacio to play in the fourth tier. In 2021, he returned to the B-team, now also in the new Tercera División RFEF.

On 7 July 2022, Castillo signed for hometown side CD Mirandés and was initially assigned to the reserve team also in the fifth tier. He made his professional debut on 13 August, coming on as a second-half substitute for Nico Serrano in a 1–1 Segunda División home draw against Sporting de Gijón.

On 30 June 2023, Castillo joined CD Teruel, newly-promoted to Primera Federación.
