= Sergio Santos (footballer, born 2001) =

Spanish footballer

Personal information
- Full name: Sergio Santos Fernández
- Date of birth: 3 January 2001 (age 25)
- Place of birth: Leganés, Spain
- Height: 1.80 m (5 ft 11 in)
- Position: Right-back

Team information
- Current team: Dubočica

Youth career
- 2006–2010: Pérez Galdós
- 2010–2012: Leganés
- 2012–2020: Real Madrid

Senior career*
Years	Team	Apps	(Gls)
2020–2022	Real Madrid B	50	(2)
2021–2023	Real Madrid	1	(0)
2022–2023	→ Mirandés (loan)	6	(0)
2023–2024	Murcia	14	(0)
2024	→ Algeciras (loan)	12	(0)
2024–2025	Real Unión	30	(0)
2025–2026	Gimnàstic	23	(0)
2026–	Dubočica	0	(0)

International career
2017	Spain U17	2	(0)
2019	Spain U19	3	(0)
2019	Spain U20	5	(0)
- * Club domestic league appearances and goals as of 24 September 2026

Sergio Santos Fernández (born 3 January 2001) is a Spanish professional footballer who mainly plays as a right-back for Serbian club Dubočica.

== Career ==
A youth product of AD Pérez Galdós and CD Leganés, Santos joined the youth academy of Real Madrid in 2012. He worked his way up their youth categories, and was promoted to their reserves in 2020.

Santos made his professional – and La Liga – debut with Real Madrid on 22 September 2021, coming on as a late substitute for fellow youth graduate Nacho in a 6–1 win over RCD Mallorca. On 20 July 2022, he renewed his contract for two further years.

On 21 July 2022, Santos was loaned to Segunda División side CD Mirandés for the season. On 8 August of the following year, after being rarely used, he left Los Blancos and signed a permanent deal with Primera Federación side Real Murcia CF.

On 1 February 2024, Santos was loaned to fellow third division side Algeciras CF, until June. On 29 July, he joined Real Unión in the same category on a one-year contract.

On 11 July 2025, Santos was announced at Gimnàstic de Tarragona still in division three, after signing a two-year deal. On 28 July of the following year, he terminated his link with the club.

== Career statistics ==
=== Club ===
As of 13 November 2022

Appearances and goals by club, season and competition
Club	Season	League			Cup		Europe		Other		Total	
Club	Season	Division	Apps	Goals	Apps	Goals	Apps	Goals	Apps	Goals	Apps	Goals
Real Madrid Castilla	2020–21	Segunda División B	22	0	–		–		1 (Note: Appearance in 2021 Segunda División B play-offs)	0	23	0
Real Madrid Castilla	2021–22	Primera División RFEF	28	2	–		–		0	0	28	2
Real Madrid Castilla	Total		50	2	0	0	0	0	0	0	51	2
Real Madrid	2021–22	La Liga	1	0	0	0	0	0	0	0	1	0
Mirandés (loan)	2022–23	Segunda División	6	0	1	0	–		0	0	7	0
Career total			57	2	0	0	0	0	0	0	59	2

== Honours ==
Real Madrid Juvenil A

- UEFA Youth League: 2019–20
