= Boris Garrós =

Spanish footballer

Personal information
- Full name: Boris Garrós Torrent
- Date of birth: 22 June 1988 (age 38)
- Place of birth: Barcelona, Spain
- Height: 1.86 m (6 ft 1 in)
- Position: Forward

Team information
- Current team: Atlètic Lleida
- Number: 10

Youth career
- –2007: Europa

Senior career*
| Years | Team | Apps | (Gls) |
| 2007–2008 | Europa | 20 | (0) |
| 2008–2009 | Masnou | 35 | (18) |
| 2009–2011 | Castelldefels | 74 | (29) |
| 2011–2013 | Cornellà | 71 | (17) |
| 2013–2014 | Sant Andreu | 2 | (0) |
| 2014 | Prat | 17 | (3) |
| 2014–2015 | Rubí | 21 | (10) |
| 2015–2016 | Hospitalet | 15 | (1) |
| 2016–2017 | Gavà | 54 | (41) |
| 2017–2018 | Recreativo Huelva | 37 | (10) |
| 2018–2019 | Apollon Smyrnis | 3 | (0) |
| 2019 | Politehnica Iași | 9 | (1) |
| 2019–2020 | Sabadell | 17 | (6) |
| 2021 | El Ejido | 17 | (1) |
| 2021–2022 | Costa Brava | 25 | (1) |
| 2023–2024 | Cerdanyola | 43 | (19) |
| 2024– | Atlètic Lleida | 51 | (21) |
- * Club domestic league appearances and goals as of 15 May 2026

Boris Garrós Torrent (born 22 June 1988) is a Spanish professional footballer who plays for Atlètic Lleida as a forward.

== Club career ==
=== Early career ===
Born in Barcelona, Catalonia, Garrós made his senior debut with CE Europa in the 2007–08 season, in Tercera División. In the following years, he played in the same tier, representing CD Masnou, UE Castelldefels, UE Cornellà before joining Segunda División B side UE Sant Andreu in the 2013 summer.

On 22 September, he made his debut, coming on as a substitute for Ferrón in a 1–0 defeat against CF Reus Deportiu.

After a stint with AE Prat in 2014, Garrós returned to the fourth tier and joined UE Rubí. In his only season for the club, he scored 10 goals in 21 games. On 27 January 2015, he signed for CE L'Hospitalet.

In early 2016, Garrós joined CF Gavà. During the 2016–17 season, he scored his career best of 25 goals in 48 matches, with his side being relegated back to Tercera División.

=== Recreativo Huelva ===
On 15 August 2017, he moved to Recreativo de Huelva on a one-year contract. He scored on his debut four days later, in a 3–2 defeat against FC Cartagena. In August 2018, Garrós rejected an offer from Indian club East Bengal citing personal reasons.

=== Apollon Smyrnis and Politehnica Iași ===
On 15 September, he moved abroad and joined Super League Greece club Apollon Smyrnis. On 31 January 2019 he signed a 6 month contract with Romanian side Politehnica Iași.
