= Casalarreina CF =

Association football club in Spain

Casalarreina
- Full name: Casalarreina Club de Fútbol
- Founded: 1997
- Ground: Estadio Municipal El Soto, La Rioja, Spain
- Capacity: 800
- President: David Fernández Moral
- Head coach: José Manuel Trejo
- League: Tercera Federación – Group 16
- 2025–26: Regional Preferente, 2nd of 18 (promoted)
- Website: https://casalarreinacf.com/
Home colours

Casalarreina Club de Fútbol is a Spanish football team located in the town of Casalarreina, autonomous community of La Rioja. Founded in 1997 it currently plays in Tercera Federación – Group 16, holding home matches at Estadio Municipal El Soto with a capacity of 800 spectators.

== History ==
Casalarreina CF was founded in 1997. Josean Ríos became its first president. In the 2014-15 season the club played in the Tercera División for the first time but it was immediately relegated back to Regional Preferente league. In 2016 Casalarreina CF returned to the Tercera División.

== Season to season ==
| Season | Tier | Division | Place | Copa del Rey |
|---|---|---|---|---|
| 1997–98 | 5 | Reg. Pref. | 11th | |
| 1998–99 | 5 | Reg. Pref. | 10th | |
| 1999–2000 | 5 | Reg. Pref. | 11th | |
| 2000–01 | 5 | Reg. Pref. | 11th | |
| 2001–02 | 5 | Reg. Pref. | 12th | |
| 2002–03 | 5 | Reg. Pref. | 3rd | |
| 2003–04 | 5 | Reg. Pref. | 16th | |
| 2004–05 | 5 | Reg. Pref. | 12th | |
| 2005–06 | 5 | Reg. Pref. | 10th | |
| 2006–07 | 5 | Reg. Pref. | 8th | |
| 2007–08 | 5 | Reg. Pref. | 5th | |
| 2008–09 | 5 | Reg. Pref. | 7th | |
| 2009–10 | 5 | Reg. Pref. | 6th | |
| 2010–11 | 5 | Reg. Pref. | 16th | |
| 2011–12 | 5 | Reg. Pref. | 9th | |
| 2012–13 | 5 | Reg. Pref. | 5th | |
| 2013–14 | 5 | Reg. Pref. | 1st | |
| 2014–15 | 4 | 3ª | 20th | |
| 2015–16 | 5 | Reg. Pref. | 3rd | |
| 2016–17 | 4 | 3ª | 15th | |

| Season | Tier | Division | Place | Copa del Rey |
|---|---|---|---|---|
| 2017–18 | 4 | 3ª | 18th | |
| 2018–19 | 5 | Reg. Pref. | 3rd | |
| 2019–20 | 4 | 3ª | 3rd | |
| 2020–21 | 4 | 3ª | 6th / 4th | |
| 2021–22 | 5 | 3ª RFEF | 5th | |
| 2022–23 | 5 | 3ª Fed. | 11th | |
| 2023–24 | 5 | 3ª Fed. | 7th | |
| 2024–25 | 5 | 3ª Fed. | 16th | |
| 2025–26 | 6 | Reg. Pref. | 2nd | |
| 2026–27 | 5 | 3ª Fed. | | |

- 5 seasons in Tercera División
- 5 seasons in Tercera Federación/Tercera División RFEF

== Notable players ==
- (Spain) Eric García
