= CE Atlètic Lleida =

Spanish association football club

Atlètic Lleida
- Full name: Club Esportiu Atlètic Lleida
- Founded: 25 September 1926 (as CE EFAC Almacelles); 22 June 2019; 7 years ago (as CE Atlètic Lleida)
- Stadium: Camp d'Esports
- Capacity: 13,500
- President: Ramon Farrús
- Head coach: Jordi López
- League: Tercera Federación – Group 5
- 2025–26: Segunda Federación – Group 3, 16th of 18 (relegated)
- Website: atleticlleida.com
Home colours	Away colours	Third colours

Club Esportiu Atlètic Lleida is a Spanish football team based in Lleida, in the autonomous community of Catalonia. Founded on 22 June 2019, they play in Tercera Federación – Group 5, holding home games at Camp de Futbol Municipal Ramón Farrús, with a capacity of 1,200 people.

== History ==
Founded on 25 September 1926 as Club Deportivo Almacellench, the club were later renamed to Club de Fútbol Almacelles and later Athlètic Almacelles in 1968 (Athletic would later be refounded in 2014). In 1986, they changed name to Club Esportiu Escola de Futbol Almacelles i Comarca.

After being only an amateur team, EFAC Almacelles started playing in a senior competition in 1988, winning promotion from the Tercera Regional. They first reached the top tier of regional football, the Primera Catalana, in 2011.

After playing the following years between Primera and Segona Catalana, EFAC reached an agreement with Club Esportiu Atlètic Lleida (a club founded on 22 June 2019) in late June 2019, with the latter taking over their place in the fifth tier from the 2020–21 season onwards. The name of "Esportiu Atlètic Lleida" was contested by the president of Lleida Esportiu at the time, Albert Esteve, by considering that the new brand could "generate confusion".

In March 2024, Diari Segre reported that Atlètic Lleida were under negotiations with CF Badalona Futur to acquire their place in either the Segunda Federación or Primera Federación, with their president Josep María Oromí stating that the negotiations were in an "advanced" stage.

In June 2024, the team achieved promotion to the Tercera Federación, entering the national Spanish football league system, so the team competed that division on the 2024–25 season. After being promoted the Atlètic Lleida board decided to withdraw from the Badalona Futur purchase negotiations, they argued that the existence of two teams from Lleida competing in the Segunda Federación would mean a sporting conflict that Atlètic wanted to avoid, in addition to seeking to strengthen their own project.

On July 9, 2025, Atlètic Lleida was promoted to the Segunda Federación after purchasing the vacant spot that had been left following the administrative relegation of Lleida CF to Tercera Federación.

=== Club background ===
- Club Deportivo Almacellench (1926–19XX)
- Club de Fútbol Almacelles (19XX–1968)
- Athlètic Almacelles (1968–1986)
- Club Esportiu Escola de Futbol Almacelles i Comarca (1986–2020)
- Club Esportiu Atlètic Lleida (2020–)

== Season to season ==
=== EFAC Almacelles ===
Season	Tier	Division	Place	Copa del Rey
1988–89	8	3ª Reg.	4th	
1989–90	7	2ª Reg.	16th	
1990–91	7	2ª Reg.	15th	
1991–92	8	2ª Terr.	15th	
1992–93	9	3ª Terr.	2nd	
1993–94	9	3ª Terr.	1st	
1994–95	8	2ª Terr.	4th	
1995–96	8	2ª Terr.	8th	
1996–97	8	2ª Terr.	5th	
1997–98	8	2ª Terr.	5th	
1998–99	7	1ª Terr.	14th	
1999–2000	7	1ª Terr.	13th	
2000–01	7	1ª Terr.	15th	
2001–02	7	1ª Terr.	14th	
2002–03	7	1ª Terr.	17th	
2003–04	8	2ª Terr.	2nd	

Season	Tier	Division	Place	Copa del Rey
2004–05	7	1ª Terr.	17th	
2005–06	8	2ª Terr.	2nd	
2006–07	7	1ª Terr.	5th	
2007–08	7	1ª Terr.	1st	
2008–09	6	Pref. Terr.	18th	
2009–10	7	1ª Terr.	2nd	
2010–11	7	1ª Terr.	1st	
2011–12	5	1ª Cat.	15th	
2012–13	6	2ª Cat.	2nd	
2013–14	5	1ª Cat.	7th	
2014–15	5	1ª Cat.	14th	
2015–16	6	2ª Cat.	2nd	
2016–17	5	1ª Cat.	6th	
2017–18	5	1ª Cat.	3rd	
2018–19	5	1ª Cat.	10th	
2019–20	5	1ª Cat.	7th	

=== Atlètic Lleida ===
Season	Tier	Division	Place	Copa del Rey
2020–21	5	1ª Cat.	6th	
2021–22	6	1ª Cat.	6th	
2022–23	6	1ª Cat.	3rd	
2023–24	6	Lliga Elit	6th	
2024–25	5	3ª Fed.	2nd	
2025–26	4	2ª Fed.	16th	First round
2026–27	5	3ª Fed.		

- 1 season in Segunda Federación
- 2 seasons in Tercera Federación

== Players ==
=== Current squad ===
As of 15 February 2026

Note: Flags indicate national team as defined under FIFA eligibility rules; some limited exceptions apply. Players may hold more than one non-FIFA nationality.

No.	Pos.	Nation	Player
1	GK	ESP	Pau Torres
2	DF	ESP	Borja López
3	DF	ESP	Dauda Koné
4	FW	ESP	Quim Utgés (on loan from Sabadell)
5	DF	ESP	Roger Alcalá
6	MF	ESP	Jordi Ortega
7	FW	ESP	Jaume Pascual
8	MF	ESP	Marcel Samsó
9	FW	MLI	Soule Sidibe
10	FW	ESP	Boris Garrós
11	FW	ESP	Moró Sidibe
12	DF	NED	Igor Irazu
13	GK	ESP	Marc Arnau

No.	Pos.	Nation	Player
14	MF	ESP	Nil Sauret
15	DF	ESP	Carlos Cobo
16	FW	ESP	Alya Camara
17	MF	ESP	Antonio Cotán
18	DF	ESP	Marc Vargas
19	DF	ESP	Axel Ayala
20	DF	ESP	Joan Campins
21	FW	ARG	Juan Agüero
22	FW	ESP	Asier Ortiz de Guinea
23	FW	ESP	Bilal Achhiba
24	DF	CMR	Aldo One
25	DF	ESP	Asier Palacios
-	FW	ESP	Carlos Mas
