= Ángel Chans =

Spanish footballer (born 2003)

Personal information
- Full name: Ángel Chans Sagüillo
- Date of birth: 24 February 2003 (age 23)
- Place of birth: A Coruña, Spain
- Position: Centre-back

Team information
- Current team: Mirandés B
- Number: 22

Youth career
- Ural
- 2021–2022: Burgos

Senior career*
Years	Team	Apps	(Gls)
2022–2023	Paiosaco	26	(1)
2023–2024	Burgos B	16	(0)
2024–	Mirandés B	30	(1)
2025–	Mirandés	0	(0)
- * Club domestic league appearances and goals as of 3 December 2025

Ángel Chans Sagüillo (born 24 February 2003) is a Spanish footballer who plays for CD Mirandés B. Mainly a centre-back, he can also play as a right-back.

== Career ==
Born in A Coruña, Galicia, Chans played for hometown side Ural CF before joining Burgos CF's Juvenil side in 2021. On 29 June 2022, after finishing his formation, he signed for Tercera Federación side UD Paiosaco.

In July 2023, Chans returned to Burgos and was assigned to the reserves also in the fifth division. Roughly one year later, he moved to another reserve team, CD Mirandés B in the same category.

Regularly used in the B-team, Chans made his first team debut with the Jabatos on 3 December 2025, coming on as a second-half substitute for Iker Varela in a 2–0 home loss to Sporting de Gijón, for the season's Copa del Rey.
