= Jon Vega =

Spanish footballer

Personal information
- Full name: Jon Vega Villasante
- Date of birth: 8 June 1994 (age 32)
- Place of birth: Miranda de Ebro, Spain
- Height: 1.79 m (5 ft 10 1/2 in)
- Position: Centre back

Team information
- Current team: Calahorra

Youth career
- Mirandés

Senior career*
Years	Team	Apps	(Gls)
2012–2015	Mirandés B		
2013	Mirandés	0	(0)
2015–2016	Coruxo	12	(0)
2016–2017	Leioa	12	(0)
2017–2019	Conquense	70	(2)
2019–2020	Leioa	7	(0)
2020–2022	Arenas Getxo	38	(0)
2022–2023	Gernika	29	(1)
2023–2024	Cerdanyola	32	(1)
2024–	Calahorra	0	(0)
- * Club domestic league appearances and goals as of 19 May 2024

Jon Vega Villasante (born 8 June 1994) is a Spanish footballer who plays as a centre back for CD Calahorra.

== Football career ==
Born in Miranda de Ebro, Province of Burgos, Vega played youth football with local CD Mirandés, and made his senior debuts with the reserves in the 2012–13 season. On 12 September 2013 he made his professional debut, starting in a 1–1 away loss against CD Lugo for the season's Copa del Rey (3–4 on penalties).

On 11 July 2015 Vega moved to Coruxo FC in Segunda División B.
