= Pau Torres (footballer, born 1987) =

Spanish footballer

Personal information
- Full name: Pau Torres Riba
- Date of birth: 4 June 1987 (age 39)
- Place of birth: Capellades, Spain
- Height: 1.85 m (6 ft 1 in)
- Position: Goalkeeper

Team information
- Current team: Atlètic Lleida
- Number: 1

Youth career
- San Mauro
- 2001–2006: Barcelona

Senior career*
Years	Team	Apps	(Gls)
2006–2007	Barcelona C		
2007–2008	Barcelona B	7	(0)
2008–2009	Terrassa	2	(0)
2009–2010	Sant Andreu	2	(0)
2010–2011	San Roque	36	(0)
2011–2012	Ceuta	29	(0)
2012–2015	Lleida Esportiu	113	(0)
2015–2016	Alavés	2	(0)
2016–2017	Valladolid	9	(0)
2017–2018	Cartagena	22	(0)
2018–2021	Lleida Esportiu	80	(0)
2022	Zamora	12	(0)
2022–2023	UCAM Murcia	34	(0)
2023–	Atlètic Lleida	74	(0)
2024	→ Europa (loan)	14	(0)
- * Club domestic league appearances and goals as of 15 May 2026

Pau Torres Riba (born 4 June 1987) is a Spanish footballer who plays as a goalkeeper for Segunda Federación club CE Atlètic Lleida.

== Club career ==
Born in Capellades, Barcelona, Catalonia, Torres finished his development with FC Barcelona, representing its C and B sides in the Tercera División. On 14 July 2008 he joined Segunda División B club Terrassa FC, going on to compete in that tier the following years with UE Sant Andreu, CD San Roque de Lepe, AD Ceuta and Lleida Esportiu.

On 17 June 2015, after three full seasons as an undisputed starter at Lleida, Torres signed a one-year deal with Segunda División side Deportivo Alavés. He made his professional debut on 19 March of the following year, keeping a clean sheet in a home draw against CD Lugo.

A backup to Fernando Pacheco, Torres appeared in only two league matches during the campaign as the Basques returned to La Liga after ten years. On 27 June 2016, he terminated his contract and joined Real Valladolid for one year on 8 July.

A year later, Torres signed a two-year deal at FC Cartagena in the third division, and helped the team win their group, though they missed out on promotion with a 1–0 play-off final loss to Extremadura UD in June 2018. In August that year, he returned to Lleida.

Torres subsequently remained in the lower leagues. He also helped CE Atlètic Lleida to achieve promotions from the amateurs Lliga Elit and Tercera Federación.

== Career statistics ==
As of match played 24 May 2025

Appearances and goals by club, season and competition
Club	Season	League			National Cup		Other		Total	
Club	Season	Division	Apps	Goals	Apps	Goals	Apps	Goals	Apps	Goals
Terrassa	2008–09	Segunda División B	2	0	—		2	0	4	0
Sant Andreu	2009–10	Segunda División B	2	0	0	0	0	0	2	0
San Roque	2010–11	Segunda División B	36	0	—		—		36	0
Ceuta	2011–12	Segunda División B	29	0	1	0	—		30	0
Lleida Esportiu	2012–13	Segunda División B	38	0	—		4	0	42	0
Lleida Esportiu	2013–14	Segunda División B	38	0	3	0	4	0	45	0
Lleida Esportiu	2014–15	Segunda División B	37	0	2	0	—		39	0
Lleida Esportiu	Total		113	0	5	0	8	0	126	0
Alavés	2015–16	Segunda División	2	0	0	0	—		2	0
Valladolid	2016–17	Segunda División	9	0	4	0	—		13	0
Cartagena	2017–18	Segunda División B	22	0	0	0	6	0	28	0
Lleida Esportiu	2018–19	Segunda División B	30	0	3	0	—		33	0
Lleida Esportiu	2019–20	Segunda División B	27	0	0	0	—		27	0
Lleida Esportiu	2020–21	Segunda División B	23	0	—		—		23	0
Lleida Esportiu	Total		80	0	3	0	—		83	0
Zamora	2021–22	Primera División RFEF	12	0	—		—		12	0
UCAM Murcia	2022–23	Segunda Federación	34	0	—		4	0	38	0
Atlètic Lleida	2023–24	Lliga Elit	14	0	—		—		14	0
Atlètic Lleida	2024–25	Tercera Federación	33	0	—		2	0	35	0
Atlètic Lleida	Total		47	0	—		2	0	49	0
Europa (loan)	2023–24	Segunda Federación	14	0	—		2	0	16	0
Career total			402	0	13	0	24	0	439	0

== Honours ==
Alavés

- Segunda División: 2015–16
