= Hodei Alutiz =

Spanish footballer (born 2003)

Personal information
- Full name: Hodei Alutiz Salgado
- Date of birth: 26 April 2003 (age 23)
- Place of birth: Vitoria-Gasteiz, Spain
- Height: 1.78 m (5 ft 10 in)
- Position: Right-back

Team information
- Current team: Mirandés B
- Number: 2

Youth career
- Alavés
- La Charca

Senior career*
Years	Team	Apps	(Gls)
2022–	Mirandés B	92	(1)
2025–	Mirandés	0	(0)
- * Club domestic league appearances and goals as of 3 December 2025

Hodei Alutiz Salgado (born 26 April 2003) is a Spanish footballer who plays as a right-back for CD Mirandés B.

== Career ==
Born in Vitoria-Gasteiz, Álava, Basque Country, Alutiz played for Deportivo Alavés and CD La Charca (an affiliate of CD Mirandés) as a youth. He made his senior debut with the reserve team of the Jabatos on 20 March 2022, coming on as a late substitute in a 2–0 Tercera División RFEF away win over Ciudad Rodrigo CF.

Definitely promoted to the B-side in July 2022, Alutiz established himself as a regular starter, and subsequently became team captain. He made his first team debut on 29 October 2025, replacing fellow debutant Aarón Cámara at extra-time in a 1–1 away draw (4–3 penalty win) against Atlético Astorga FC, for the season's Copa del Rey.

Alutiz made his professional debut on 3 December 2025, starting in a 2–0 home loss to Sporting de Gijón, also for the national cup.
