= Eric García (footballer, born 1993) =

Spanish footballer

Eric
Personal information
- Full name: Eric García Orive
- Date of birth: 18 July 1993 (age 33)
- Place of birth: Miranda de Ebro, Spain
- Position: Midfielder

Youth career
- Mirandés

Senior career*
Years	Team	Apps	(Gls)
2013–2016	Mirandés B	90	(12)
2015	Mirandés	0	(0)
2016–2023	Casalarreina	140	(29)
Total		230	(41)
- * Club domestic league appearances and goals

Eric García Orive (born 18 July 1993), known simply as Eric or sometimes as Pita, is a Spanish retired footballer who played as a midfielder.

== Club career ==
Eric made his senior debut with CD Mirandés' reserve team in the 2013–14 season, in the regional leagues. On 9 September 2015, he made his first team debut, starting in a 1–2 Copa del Rey home loss against CA Osasuna.

Eric left Mirandés in September 2016, and joined Casalarreina CF in Tercera División. In July 2018, despite suffering relegation, he renewed his contract with the club.
