= Carlos Martín (footballer) =

Spanish footballer (born 2002)

Personal information
- Full name: Carlos Martín Domínguez
- Date of birth: 22 April 2002 (age 24)
- Place of birth: Madrid, Spain
- Height: 1.81 m (5 ft 11 in)
- Position: Forward

Team information
- Current team: Hajduk Split (on loan from Atlético Madrid)
- Number: 77

Youth career
- 2008–2021: Atlético Madrid

Senior career*
Years	Team	Apps	(Gls)
2021–2023	Atlético Madrid B	60	(33)
2021–	Atlético Madrid	5	(0)
2023–2024	→ Mirandés (loan)	40	(15)
2024–2025	→ Alavés (loan)	26	(2)
2026	→ Rayo Vallecano (loan)	11	(0)
2026–	→ Hajduk Split (loan)	7	(3)

International career^{‡}
2023–	Spain U21	4	(1)
- * Club domestic league appearances and goals as of 9 November 2026 ‡ National team caps and goals as of 21:18, 4 March 2024 (UTC)

Carlos Martín Domínguez (born 22 April 2002) is a Spanish professional footballer who plays as a forward for Croatian Football League club Hajduk Split, on loan from La Liga club Atlético Madrid.

== Career ==
Martín joined the youth academy of Atlético Madrid in 2008, and started training with their first team in the summer of 2021. He made his senior debut with Atletico in a 1–0 La Liga win over Osasuna on 20 November 2021, coming on as a sub in the 85th minute.

On 4 August 2023, Martín was loaned to Segunda División side Mirandés for the season. On his club debut ten days later, he scored a brace in a 4–0 home routing of Alcorcón. They were also his first professional goals.

Martín ended the 2023–24 season with 15 goals as Mirandés avoided relegation; highlights included another brace against Andorra (4–3 home win) and Eldense (3–1 home win). Upon returning to Atleti, he renewed his contract until 2029 on 9 July 2024, but was loaned to fellow top tier side Alavés on 17 August.

Back to Atleti in July 2025, Martín was rarely used and was once again loaned out on 2 January 2026, this time to fellow La Liga side Rayo Vallecano until the end of the 2025–26 season.

== Career statistics ==
As of match played 23 May 2026

Appearances and goals by club, season and competition
Club	Season	League			Cup		Europe		Other		Total	
Club	Season	Division	Apps	Goals	Apps	Goals	Apps	Goals	Apps	Goals	Apps	Goals
Atlético Madrid B	2021–22	Tercera Federación	29	12	—		—		—		29	12
Atlético Madrid B	2022–23	Segunda Federación	31	21	—		—		4 (Note: Appearances in 2023 Segunda Federación play-offs)	0	35	21
Atlético Madrid B	Total		60	33	—		—		4	0	64	33
Atlético Madrid	2021–22	La Liga	1	0	1	0	0	0	0	0	2	0
Atlético Madrid	2022–23	La Liga	4	0	0	0	0	0	0	0	4	0
Atlético Madrid	2025–26	La Liga	0	0	1	0	1 (Note: Appearance in UEFA Champions League)	0	—		2	0
Atlético Madrid	Total		5	0	2	0	1	0	0	0	8	0
Mirandés (loan)	2023–24	Segunda División	40	15	0	0	—		—		40	15
Alavés (loan)	2024–25	La Liga	26	2	1	0	—		—		27	2
Rayo Vallecano (loan)	2025–26	La Liga	11	0	1	0	0	0	—		12	0
Career total			142	50	4	0	1	0	4	0	151	50
