= Asier Ortiz de Guinea =

Spanish footballer (born 2002)

Personal information
- Full name: Asier Ortiz de Guinea García
- Date of birth: 10 May 2002 (age 24)
- Place of birth: Miranda de Ebro, Spain
- Height: 1.82 m (6 ft 0 in)
- Position: Midfielder

Team information
- Current team: Atlètic Lleida
- Number: 22

Youth career
- 2007–2010: Colegio Príncipe de España
- 2010–2014: Casco Viejo
- 2014–2021: Real Sociedad
- 2018: → Casco Viejo (loan)

Senior career*
Years	Team	Apps	(Gls)
2021–2025	Mirandés B	109	(13)
2023–2025	Mirandés	1	(0)
2025–	Atlètic Lleida	27	(1)
- * Club domestic league appearances and goals as of 15 May 2026

Asier Ortiz de Guinea García (born 10 May 2002), known as Asier Ortiz de Guinea or Asier Ortiz, is a Spanish footballer who plays as a midfielder for Segunda Federación club CE Atlètic Lleida.

== Career ==
Born in Miranda de Ebro, Burgos, Castile and León, Ortiz began his career with hometown side CEIP Príncipe de España at the age of five, and subsequently played for CD Casco Viejo before joining Real Sociedad's youth sides in July 2014. In December 2018, he returned to his former side Casco Viejo on loan.

On 7 July 2021, Ortiz agreed to a two-year contract with CD Mirandés, being assigned to the reserves in Tercera División RFEF. He made his first team debut on 6 December 2023, starting in a 2–0 away loss to CD Lugo, for the season's Copa del Rey.

Ortiz made his professional debut on 16 August 2024, coming on as a late substitute for fellow debutant Sergio Gabriel due to an injury in a 1–0 Segunda División home win over Córdoba CF.

== Personal life ==
Ortiz's father Luis Carlos was also a footballer and a midfielder. He too played for Mirandés.
