= Ashley Carter =

English footballer (born 1995)

Personal information
- Full name: Ashley Carter
- Date of birth: 12 September 1995 (age 31)
- Place of birth: New Zealand
- Position: Defender

Team information
- Current team: Stourbridge

Youth career
- Wolverhampton Wanderers

Senior career*
Years	Team	Apps	(Gls)
2014–2016	Wolverhampton Wanderers	0	(0)
2015	→ Chesterfield (loan)	2	(0)
2016	→ Tamworth (loan)	9	(0)
2016–2017	Kidderminster Harriers	20	(1)
2017–2018	Alvechurch		
2018	Nuneaton Borough	15	(0)
2018–2019	Alvechurch	27	(1)
2019–2020	Stourbridge	27	(0)
2020–2021	Halesowen Town	4	(0)
2021–2023	Alvechurch	77	(2)
2023–2024	Coalville Town	38	(0)
2024	Walsall Wood	9	(1)
2024–2026	Bromsgrove Sporting	40	(0)
2026-	Stourbridge	0	(0)
- * Club domestic league appearances and goals as of 14:21, 12 October 2024 (UTC)

Ashley Carter (born 12 September 1995) is an English footballer who plays for Southern League Premier Division Central side Stourbridge, where he plays as a defender.

== Career ==
=== Wolverhampton Wanderers ===
Carter signed his first professional contract with Wolverhampton Wanderers on 12 February 2014.

=== Chesterfield (loan) ===
Carter joined League One side Chesterfield on a month-long youth loan on 2 February 2015. Carter made his debut for Chesterfield on 17 February 2015 in a 0–2 defeat away to Scunthorpe United. His loan was subsequently extended to run until the end of the season, but despite this the player never played again for Chesterfield during the period.

=== Tamworth (loan) ===
On 4 March 2016, Carter joined Tamworth on loan for the remainder of the season. Carter made his Tamworth debut the following day in a home fixture against Stockport County, and gave a good account of himself in a new look back three formation, the match finished in a 1–1 draw.

=== Kidderminster Harriers ===
On 29 June 2016, Carter signed a one-year deal with Conference North side Kidderminster Harriers.

=== Alvechurch ===
Following on from his release by Kidderminster Harriers, Carter joined Northern Premier League Division One South side Alvechurch on 12 May 2017 on a two-year contract.

=== Nuneaton Borough ===
Carter joined Conference North side Nuneaton Borough from Alvechurch on 28 June 2018. Carter still had a year to run on his contract with Alvechurch, but both clubs eventually agreed a deal for an undisclosed fee.

=== Alvechurch ===
On 14 November 2018, Carter re-joined Alvechurch. He made his second debut for the club on 17 November 2018, in a Southern League Premier Central fixture against St Neots Town, which Alvechurch won 3–2.

=== Stourbridge ===
Carter joined Stourbridge on 30 May 2019.

=== Coalville Town ===
In May 2023, he joined Coalville Town.

=== Walsall Wood ===
In May 2024, Carter joined Northern Premier League Division One Midlands club Walsall Wood.

=== Bromsgrove Sporting ===
On 10 October 2024, Carter joined Southern League Premier Division Central club Bromsgrove Sporting.

=== Return to Stourbridge ===
In January 2026, Carter joined Stourbridge for a second time, following former Bromsgrove manager Scott Adey-Linforth's return to the club.
