= Berantevilla =

- Municipality
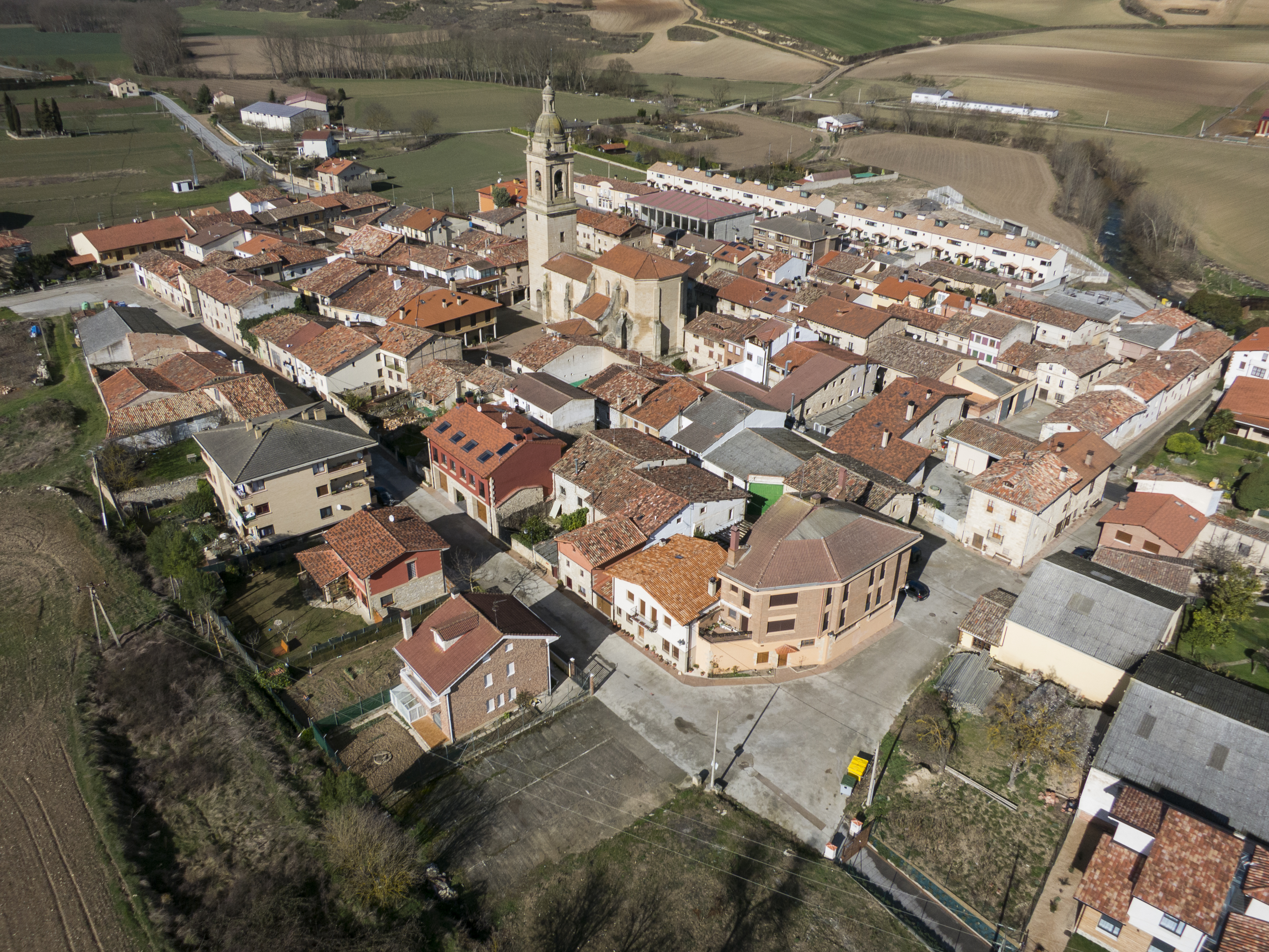
- Aerial view of Berantevilla

- Location of Berantevilla within the Basque Country
- Coordinates: 42°40.94′N 2°51.62′W
- Country: Spain
- Autonomous Community: Basque Country
- Province: Álava
- Comarca: Cuadrilla de Añana

Government
  - Mayor: Juan Antonio Santamaria Fajardo

Area
  - Total: 35.73 km^{2} (13.80 sq mi)
- Elevation (AMSL): 471 m (1,545 ft)

Population (2025-01-01)
  - Total: 461
  - Density: 12.9/km^{2} (33.4/sq mi)
- Time zone: UTC+1 (CET)
  - Summer (DST): UTC+2 (CEST (GMT +2))
- Postal code: 01211
- Area code: +34 (Spain) + 94 (Biscay)

Berantevilla is a town and municipality located in the province of Álava, in the Basque Country, northern Spain.
