= Unax del Cura =

Spanish footballer (born 2005)

Personal information
- Full name: Unax del Cura Urra
- Date of birth: 8 February 2005 (age 21)
- Place of birth: Bilbao, Spain
- Height: 1.83 m (6 ft 0 in)
- Positions: Attacking midfielder; forward

Team information
- Current team: Leganés

Youth career
- 2019–2020: Roda
- 2020–2021: Villarreal
- 2021–2022: Roda
- 2022–2023: Villarreal

Senior career*
Years	Team	Apps	(Gls)
2023–2025	Villarreal C	40	(7)
2025	→ Lleida (loan)	9	(0)
2025–2026	Mirandés B	22	(7)
2026	Mirandés	13	(5)
2026–	Leganés	0	(0)

International career
2022	Spain U18	2	(0)
- * Club domestic league appearances and goals as of 9 June 2026

Unax del Cura Urra (born 8 February 2005) is a Spanish footballer who plays as either an attacking midfielder or a forward for CD Leganés.

== Club career ==
Born in Bilbao, Biscay, Basque Country, del Cura joined Villarreal CF in 2019, aged 14, and spent his formative years playing for their youth sides and affiliate club CD Roda. He made his senior debut with the C-team on 8 September 2023, starting in a 3–0 Tercera Federación loss to Roda.

On 3 February 2025, del Cura was loaned to Segunda Federación side Lleida CF until June. After his loan ended, he left his parent club in July and moved to another reserve team, CD Mirandés B in the fifth division.

Del Cura made his first team debut on 13 March 2026, coming on as a half-time substitute for Ali Houary in a 2–0 Segunda División home loss to Cádiz CF. He impressed enough on his debut to remain with the main squad until the end of the season, and was handed his first start nine days later, where he scored the equalizer in a 2–1 home win over Real Valladolid.

On 16 April 2026, already established as a first team regular, del Cura renewed his contract with the Jabatos until 2028. On 14 August, after suffering relegation, he signed a four-year deal with CD Leganés also in division two.

== International career ==
On 2 November 2022, del Cura was called up to the Spain national under-18 team for two friendlies against Switzerland.
