= CD Mirandés B =

Association football club in Spain

Mirandés B
- Full name: Club Deportivo Mirandés B
- Nickname: Los Rojillos (The Reds) Jabatos (Young Wild Boar)
- Founded: 1967 (as CD Mirandés Promesas); 2004 (refounded)
- Ground: Estadio Municipal de Ence, Burgos
- Capacity: 6,900
- Chairman: (Spain) Alfredo de Miguel Crespo
- Manager: (Spain) José Manuel Trejo
- League: Tercera Federación – Group 8
- 2025–26: Tercera Federación – Group 8, 8th of 18
- Website: http://www.cdmirandes.com/
Home colours	Away colours	Third colours

Club Deportivo Mirandés B is a Spanish football team based in Miranda de Ebro, Province of Burgos, in the autonomous community of Castile and León. Founded in 1967, it plays in Tercera Federación – Group 8 and is the reserve team of CD Mirandés, holding home matches at Estadio Municipal de Anduva.

== History ==
CD Mirandés initially had an affiliation with Miranda FC, but the club folded in 1962. In 1967, a reserve team was founded under the name of CD Mirandés Promesas, but ceased activities three times.

A club under the name of CD Mirandés B first appeared in an official competition in 1998, but stopped playing in 2002. In 2004 the club was refounded and started playing in the La Rioja's Regional Preferente. After its first season, the club passed to play in Regional Aficionados of Castile and León.

After being always in mid-table positions (including a relegation to Primera Aficionados in 2008–09), Mirandés B finished first in the 2013–14 campaign, achieving promotion to Tercera División for the first time ever, after a draw against CD Onzonilla.

=== Club background ===
- Club Deportivo Mirandés Promesas (1967–1995)
- Club Deportivo Mirandés "B" (1998–present)

== Season to season ==
- CD Mirandés Promesas

Season	Tier	Division	Place
1967–68	6	2ª Reg.	4th
1968–1988	DNP		
1988–89	6	1ª Reg.	5th
1989–90	6	1ª Reg.	7th
1990–91	6	1ª Reg.	2nd
1991–92	5	Reg. Pref.	6th
1992–93	DNP		
1993–94	DNP		
1994–95	5	Reg. Pref.	19th

- CD Mirandés "B"

Season	Tier	Division	Place
1998–99	5	Reg. Pref.	5th
1999–2000	5	Reg. Pref.	9th
2000–01	5	Reg. Pref.	12th
2001–02	5	Reg. Pref.	1st
2002–03	DNP		
2003–04	DNP		
2004–05	5	Reg. Pref.	4th
2005–06	5	1ª Reg.	12th
2006–07	5	1ª Reg.	8th
2007–08	5	1ª Reg.	10th
2008–09	5	1ª Reg.	14th
2009–10	6	1ª Prov.	3rd
2010–11	6	1ª Prov.	2nd
2011–12	5	1ª Reg.	9th
2012–13	5	1ª Reg.	4th
2013–14	5	1ª Reg.	1st
2014–15	4	3ª	10th
2015–16	4	3ª	17th
2016–17	4	3ª	19th
2017–18	5	1ª Reg.	5th

Season	Tier	Division	Place
2018–19	5	1ª Reg.	2nd
2019–20	4	3ª	19th
2020–21	4	3ª	5th / 2nd
2021–22	5	3ª RFEF	4th
2022–23	5	3ª Fed.	9th
2023–24	5	3ª Fed.	14th
2024–25	5	3ª Fed.	12th
2025–26	5	3ª Fed.	8th
2026–27	5	3ª Fed.	

- 5 seasons in Tercera División
- 6 seasons in Tercera Federación/Tercera División RFEF

== Current squad ==
As of 8 April 2026.

Note: Flags indicate national team as defined under FIFA eligibility rules; some limited exceptions apply. Players may hold more than one non-FIFA nationality.

No.	Pos.	Nation	Player
1	GK	ESP	Ale Gorrín
2	DF	ESP	Hodei Alutiz
3	DF	ESP	Sergio Lucio
4	DF	NGA	Isaac Udoh
5	DF	ESP	Edu Coniac
6	FW	ESP	Alex Buje
7	FW	ESP	Yidne Pinto
8	MF	ESP	Hugo Zárate
9	FW	ESP	Markel Martínez
10	MF	ESP	Marcos Arriola
11	FW	ESP	Sergio Gabriel

No.	Pos.	Nation	Player
13	GK	ESP	Ekaitz Peñalver
14	MF	ESP	Alejandro de Lucas
15	DF	MLI	Abdoulaye Maiga
16	MF	ESP	Joaquín Calzado
18	FW	ESP	Aarón Cámara
19	FW	ESP	Aritz Uriarte
20	FW	ESP	Julen Martínez
21	MF	ESP	Unax del Cura
22	DF	ESP	Diego Rosales
23	DF	ESP	Ángel Chans

=== From Youth Academy ===
Note: Flags indicate national team as defined under FIFA eligibility rules; some limited exceptions apply. Players may hold more than one non-FIFA nationality.

No.	Pos.	Nation	Player
26	GK	ESP	Sergio Azcorreta
27	FW	ESP	Yuri
28	FW	ESP	Iker Fernández

No.	Pos.	Nation	Player
29	MF	ESP	Pablo Matute
30	MF	ESP	Abraham Fernández

=== Current technical staff ===
Position	Staff
Head coach	(Spain) José Manuel Trejo
Fitness coach	(Spain) Diego Gutiérrez-Cabello
Goalkeeping coach	(Spain) Hugo Pérez
Assistant coach	(Spain) José María Alonso
Analyst	(Spain) Juan López
Physiotherapist	(Spain) Marco Varas Ibañez
Kit man	(Spain) Ruben Rodriguez Izquierdo
Match delegate	(Spain) Juan José Pereda Morquecho
Team delegate	(Spain) Luis Valentin Rodriguez Grijalba

Last updated: February 2024
Source: Cuerpo Técnico CD Mirandés B (in Spanish)

== Notable youth graduates ==
- (Guinea) Moussa Traoré
- (Spain) Sergio Gabriel
- (Spain) Eric García
- (Spain) Ekhiotz Orobio
- (Spain) Asier Ortiz de Guinea
- (Spain) Sergio Pérez
- (Spain) Diego Rosales
- (Spain) Jon Vega
