= Jordi Ortega =

Spanish footballer

Personal information
- Full name: Jordi Ortega Alcalá
- Date of birth: 27 January 1995 (age 31)
- Place of birth: Mataró, Spain
- Height: 1.75 m (5 ft 9 in)
- Position: Midfielder

Team information
- Current team: Atlètic Lleida
- Number: 6

Youth career
- Mataró
- Sánchez Llibre
- Vilassar Mar
- 2011–2014: Barcelona
- 2014–2015: Wolverhampton Wanderers

Senior career*
Years	Team	Apps	(Gls)
2015–2018	Córdoba B	109	(0)
2017	Córdoba	1	(0)
2018–2020	Melilla	22	(1)
2020–2021	Calahorra	16	(0)
2021–2022	Talavera	32	(0)
2022–2023	Recreativo Huelva	18	(0)
2023	SD Logroñés	8	(0)
2024	Badalona	13	(0)
2024–	Atlètic Lleida	58	(2)
- * Club domestic league appearances and goals as of 15 May 2026

Jordi Ortega Alcalá (born 27 January 1995) is a Spanish footballer who plays for Atlètic Lleida as a central midfielder.

== Club career ==
Born in Mataró, Barcelona, Catalonia, Ortega joined FC Barcelona's youth setup in 2011, after representing CE Mataró, Fundaciò Sánchez Llibre and UE Vilassar de Mar. On 4 June 2014, after winning the 2013–14 UEFA Youth League, he signed for Wolverhampton Wanderers.

On 21 July 2015, Ortega joined Córdoba CF, being initially assigned to the reserves in Tercera División. He made his senior debut on 23 August, starting in a 2–0 away win against UB Lebrijana.

On 21 December 2016, Ortega renewed his contract until 2020. The following 10 June, he made his first team debut, coming on as a substitute for Federico Piovaccari in a 2–1 Segunda División home win against Girona FC.

On 26 July 2018, Ortega signed a two-year contract with Segunda División B side UD Melilla, after terminating his contract with the Blanquiverdes.

== Honours ==
=== Club ===
Barcelona

- UEFA Youth League: 2013–14
