= Diego Rosales (Spanish footballer) =

Spanish footballer (born 2003)

Personal information
- Full name: Diego Rosales Illanes
- Date of birth: 29 April 2003 (age 23)
- Place of birth: Miranda de Ebro, Spain
- Position: Left back

Team information
- Current team: Mirandés B
- Number: 16

Youth career
- Mirandés

Senior career*
Years	Team	Apps	(Gls)
2020–	Mirandés B	37	(1)
2023–	Mirandés	1	(0)
- * Club domestic league appearances and goals as of 12 May 2024

Diego Rosales Illanes (born 29 April 2003) is a Spanish footballer who plays as a left back for CD Mirandés B.

== Career ==
Born in Miranda de Ebro, Burgos, Castile and León, Rosales was a CD Mirandés youth graduate. He made his senior debut with the reserves at the age of 17 on 31 October 2020, coming on as a late substitute in a 3–0 Tercera División home win over Arandina CF.

On 29 August 2022, after finishing his formation, Rosales was definitely promoted to the B-team, now in Tercera Federación. He scored his first senior goal on 27 November, netting his side's seventh in a 7–1 home routing of UD Santa Marta.

Rosales made his professional debut on 14 August 2023, replacing Juan María Alcedo late into a 4–0 Segunda División home routing of AD Alcorcón.
