= Barbu (footballer) =

Spanish footballer (born 2001)

Personal information
- Full name: Alejandro Barbudo Lorenzo
- Date of birth: 26 May 2001 (age 25)
- Place of birth: Leganés, Spain
- Height: 1.89 m (6 ft 2 in)
- Position: Centre back

Team information
- Current team: Antequera
- Number: 4

Youth career
- 2013–2015: Atlético Madrid
- 2015–2016: Getafe
- 2016–2020: Alcorcón

Senior career*
Years	Team	Apps	(Gls)
2019–2022	Alcorcón B	26	(1)
2021–2022	→ Real Unión (loan)	25	(2)
2022–2024	Mirandés	54	(4)
2024–2025	Fuenlabrada	27	(1)
2025–	Antequera	35	(2)
- * Club domestic league appearances and goals as of 10 June 2026

Alejandro Barbudo Lorenzo (born 26 May 2001), commonly known as Barbu, is a Spanish footballer who plays as a central defender for Primera Federación club Antequera.

== Club career ==
Born in Leganés, Community of Madrid, Barbu represented Atlético Madrid, Getafe CF and AD Alcorcón as a youth. He made his senior debut with the latter's reserves on 1 September 2019, starting in a 2–2 Tercera División home draw against DAV Santa Ana.

On 11 July 2021, after establishing himself as a regular starter for Alcorcón B, Barbu was loaned to Primera División RFEF side Real Unión for the season. He was a first-choice during most of the campaign, as his side narrowly missed out a play-off spot.

On 29 July 2022, Barbu signed a three-year contract with CD Mirandés in Segunda División. He made his professional debut on 22 October, starting in a 1–1 home draw against SD Huesca.

Barbu scored his first professional goal on 21 November 2022, netting his team's second in a 2–1 home win over FC Cartagena. On 29 August 2024, he terminated his link with the Jabatos.

On 30 August 2024, Barbu signed with Fuenlabrada in Primera Federación.
