= Alan Godoy =

Spanish footballer (born 2003)

Personal information
- Full name: Alan Godoy Domínguez
- Date of birth: 4 May 2003 (age 23)
- Place of birth: Las Palmas, Spain
- Height: 1.78 m (5 ft 10 in)
- Positions: Forward; winger

Team information
- Current team: Barcelona B

Youth career
- Las Palmas
- Fundación Marcet
- Atlético Madrid
- Las Palmas
- 2018–2019: Alavés

Senior career*
Years	Team	Apps	(Gls)
2019–2023	Alavés B	60	(14)
2023	→ Sanluqueño (loan)	13	(8)
2023–2024	→ Mirandés (loan)	10	(1)
2024	→ Gimnàstic (loan)	21	(6)
2024–2025	Eldense	11	(0)
2025–	Barcelona B	9	(3)
2025–2026	→ Estrela Amadora (loan)	6	(0)
2026	→ Sabadell (loan)	18	(1)

International career
2019	Spain U16	8	(2)
- * Club domestic league appearances and goals as of 25 May 2026

Alan Godoy Domínguez (born 4 May 2003) is a Spanish professional footballer who plays as a forward or winger for FC Barcelona Atlètic.

== Club career ==
Born in Las Palmas, Canary Islands, Godoy joined Deportivo Alavés' youth setup in 2018, from UD Las Palmas. He made his senior debut with the reserves on 25 August 2019 at the age of just 16, coming on as a second-half substitute in a 1–1 Segunda División B home draw against UD Logroñés.

Godoy scored his first goal on 27 October 2019, netting his team's second in a 2–0 home win over Haro Deportivo. On 31 March 2021, he renewed his contract until 2025.

On 31 January 2023, Godoy was loaned to Segunda Federación side Atlético Sanluqueño CF until June. On 4 August, he moved to CD Mirandés in Segunda División on a season-long loan deal.

Godoy made his professional debut on 14 August 2023, starting in a 4–0 home routing of AD Alcorcón. He scored his first professional goal on 10 September, netting his team's third in a 4–3 home win over FC Andorra.

On 24 January 2024, Godoy's loan with the Jabatos was terminated, and he moved to Gimnàstic de Tarragona also in a temporary deal until June. On 14 July, he signed a three-year deal with CD Eldense in the second division.

On 1 February 2025, FC Barcelona Atlètic announced that they signed Godoy for an undisclosed fee from Eldense. He has signed a contract that runs through 30 June 2027.

On 5 July 2025, Godoy was sent on a season-long loan to Primeira Liga side CF Estrela da Amadora. However, on 12 January 2026, after making six appearances for the club, his loan was terminated by mutual agreement, and moved to CE Sabadell FC also in a temporary deal the following day.
