= 2026–27 Deportivo Alavés season =

Deportivo Alavés
2026–27 season
- Head coach: Quique Sánchez Flores
- Stadium: Mendizorroza

The 2026–27 season is the 106th season in the history of Deportivo Alavés, and the club's fourth consecutive season in La Liga. In addition to the domestic league, the club participated in the Copa del Rey.

== Players ==
=== Current squad ===
As of 3 September 2026

Note: Flags indicate national team as defined under FIFA eligibility rules; some limited exceptions apply. Players may hold more than one non-FIFA nationality.

No.	Pos.	Nation	Player
1	GK	ESP	Antonio Sivera (captain)
2	DF	ARG	Nicolás Valentini
3	DF	MAR	Youssef Enríquez
4	MF	ESP	Denis Suárez
5	DF	ARG	Facundo Garcés
6	MF	ESP	Ander Guevara (vice-captain)
7	MF	ESP	Ángel Pérez
8	MF	ESP	Antonio Blanco
9	FW	DOM	Mariano Díaz
10	MF	ESP	Carles Aleñá
11	FW	ESP	Toni Martínez
12	DF	ESP	Hugo Novoa
13	GK	ARG	Adrián Rodríguez
14	DF	ARG	Nahuel Tenaglia (3rd captain)

No.	Pos.	Nation	Player
15	FW	ARG	Lucas Boyé
16	DF	FIN	Ville Koski
17	DF	ESP	Jonny Otto
18	MF	ESP	Mikel Rodríguez
19	MF	ESP	Pablo Ibáñez
20	FW	ESP	Aitor Mañas
21	MF	ALG	Abde Rebbach
22	MF	ESP	Miguel Rodríguez
23	MF	URU	Carlos Protesoni
24	MF	GUI	Selu Diallo
27	DF	ESP	Xanet Olaiz
29	MF	ESP	Izei Hernández
31	GK	CAN	Grégoire Świderski

== Transactions ==
=== Transfers in ===
Date	Pos.	Nat.	Name	Club	Fee	Ref.
15 June 2026	DF	(Finland)	Ville Koski	(Croatia) Istra 1961	Transfer	
16 July 2026	MF	(Spain)	Mikel Rodríguez	(Spain) Real Sociedad B	Transfer	
27 July 2026	MF	(Spain)	Miguel Rodríguez	(Netherlands) Utrecht	Transfer	
7 August 2026	DF	(Argentina)	Nicolás Valentini	(Italy) Fiorentina	Transfer	

=== Transfers out ===
Date	Pos.	Nat.	Name	Club	Fee	Ref.
19 May 2026	FW	(Spain)	Asier Villalibre	(Spain) Racing de Santander	Transfer	
10 June 2026	MF	(Spain)	Jon Guridi	(Spain) Sevilla	Free transfer	
7 July 2026	GK	(Spain)	Raúl Fernández	(Spain) CD Leganés	Free transfer	
14 July 2026	DF	(Spain)	Víctor Parada	(Russia) Spartak Moscow	Transfer	
13 August 2026	DF	(Serbia)	Nikola Maraš		Contract termination	
19 August 2026	MF	(Mali)	Moussa Diarra	(United Arab Emirates) Al Wahda	Transfer	
26 August 2026	GK	(Equatorial Guinea)	Jesús Owono	(Spain) Andorra	Free transfer	

=== Loans out ===
Date	Pos.	Nat.	Name	Club	Duration	Ref.
8 July 2026	FW	(Spain)	Unai Ropero	(Spain) Racing de Ferrol	End of season	
14 July 2026	DF	(Spain)	Adrián Pica	(Portugal) Penafiel	End of season	

== Competitions ==
=== La Liga ===
==== League table ====
Pos	Team	Pld	W	D	L	GF	GA	GD	Pts
7	Racing Santander	13	5	2	6	20	32	−12	17
8	Athletic Bilbao	12	4	4	4	15	12	+3	16
9	Alavés	13	4	4	5	18	18	0	16
10	Villarreal	13	4	3	6	19	18	+1	15
11	Espanyol	13	4	3	6	14	14	0	15

Updated to match(es) played on 22 November 2026. Source: LaLiga EA Sports
Rules for classification: 1) Points; 2) Head-to-head points; 3) Head-to-head goal difference; 4) Goal difference; 5) Goals scored; 6) Fair-play points (if three or more teams tied); 7) Play-off at neutral site.
(Note: Head-to-head record is used only after all the matches between the teams in question have been played)

==== Matches ====
15 August 2026 1	Deportivo Alavés	3–0	Getafe	Vitoria-Gasteiz
19:30 CEST (UTC+2)	Suárez (yellow card) 45+3'; Rebbach (yellow card) 66'; Tenaglia 73'; Blanco (yellow card) 85'; Mariano 90+1', (yellow card) 90+2'; Rodríguez 90+4'	Report	Davinchi (yellow card) 10'; Martín (yellow card) 23'; Femenía (yellow card) 42' (red card); Djené (yellow card) 76'	Stadium: Mendizorrotza Stadium; Attendance: 13,923; Referee: Manuel Orellana Cid

20 August 2026 2	Rayo Vallecano	1–1	Alavés	Puente de Vallecas
21:00 CEST (UTC+2)	Camello 48', (yellow card) 73'	Report	Tenaglia (yellow card) 45+2'; Mariano 84'; Valentini (yellow card) 90+2'	Stadium: Vallecas Stadium; Attendance: 4,280; Referee: José Munuera Montero

28 August 2026 3	Alavés	1–0	Villarreal	Vitoria-Gasteiz
21:30 CEST (UTC+2)	Boyé 31'; Rebbach (yellow card) 48'; Mariano (yellow card) 89'; Sivera (yellow card) 90+2'	Report	Pépé (yellow card) 86'; Veiga (yellow card) 90+2'	Stadium: Mendizorrotza; Attendance: 15,556; Referee: Isidro Díaz de Mera Escuderos

6 September 2026 4	Alavés	5–2	Osasuna	Vitoria-Gasteiz
18:30 CEST (UTC+2)	Boyé 27', 51', 68'; Mariano 36'; Abde (yellow card) 62'; Ibáñez 90'	Report	Budimir 46', 64' (pen.); Bretones (yellow card) 58'; Rockson (yellow card) 84'	Stadium: Mendizorrotza Stadium; Attendance: 18,920; Referee: José María Sánchez Martínez

12 September 2026 5	Racing de Santander	2–1	Deportivo Alavés	Santander
14:00 CEST (UTC+2)	Zabiri (yellow card) 35', (goal) 38', 53'; Salinas (yellow card) 62'; Almeida (yellow card) 89' (red card)	Report	Tenaglia (yellow card) 7'; Ibáñez (yellow card) 8'; Koski 18'; Blanco (yellow card) 62'	Stadium: Campos de Sport de El Sardinero; Attendance: 21,342; Referee: Javier Alberola Rojas

15 September 2026 6	Deportivo Alavés	0–1	Valencia CF	Vitoria-Gasteiz
20:00 CEST (UTC+2)	Blanco (yellow card) 21'		Guerra (yellow card) 21'; Pepelu (yellow card) 45+2'; Mayol (yellow card) 52'; Rodríguez (yellow card) 61'; Rioja 78'	Stadium: Mendizorrotza Stadium; Attendance: 16,161; Referee: Miguel Sesma Espinosa

19 September 2026 7	Athletic Bilbao	0–0	Alavés	Bilbao
16:15 CEST (UTC+2)	Sancet (penalty missed) 70'; de Galarreta (yellow card) 71'; Areso (yellow card) 90+3'	Report		Stadium: San Mamés; Attendance: 47,254; Referee: Víctor García Verdura

10 October 2026 8	Alavés	1–2	Atlético Madrid	Vitoria-Gasteiz
16:15 CEST (UTC+2)	Boyé 45+6' (pen.); Pérez (yellow card) 61' (red card)	Report	Grimaldo 33'; Lookman (yellow card) 45'; Le Normand (yellow card) 45+2'; Romero 87'; Cardoso (yellow card) 90+2'	Stadium: Mendizorrotza; Attendance: 17,741; Referee: Alejandro Quintero González

18 October 2026 9	Celta	1–2	Deportivo Alavés	Vigo
16:15 CEST (UTC+2)	Cáceres (yellow card) 15'; Jutglà 53'; Rodríguez 71'	Report	Martínez (yellow card) 45'; Novoa 87'	Stadium: Balaídos Stadium; Attendance: 19,568; Referee: José Munuera Montero

23 October 2026 10	Deportivo Alavés	1–1	Málaga CF	Vitoria-Gasteiz
21:00 CEST (UTC+2)	Boyé (yellow card) 39'; Tenaglia (yellow card) 67'; Mañas 89'	Report	Niño 44+1'; Dotor (yellow card) 84'	Stadium: Mendizorrotza Stadium; Attendance: 16,099; Referee: Carlos Muñiz Muñoz

31 October 2026 11	Barcelona	6–1	Alavés	Barcelona
21:00 CET (UTC+1)	Raphinha 8', 41'; Fermín 23'; Pedri (yellow card) 40'; Yamal 45+1', 64'; Cancelo (yellow card) 57'; Gordon 81'	Report	Protesoni (yellow card) 27'; Pérez (yellow card) 45+3'; Ibáñez (yellow card) 60'; Mariano 84'	Stadium: Camp Nou; Attendance: 53,523; Referee: Adrián Cordero Vega

6 November 2026 12	Sevilla	0–0	Alavés	Seville
21:00 CET (UTC+1)	Sangante (yellow card) 47'	Report	Ibáñez (yellow card) 30'; Martínez (yellow card) 63'; Valentini (yellow card) 64'	Stadium: Ramón Sánchez-Pizjuán; Attendance: 38,803; Referee: Luis Bestard Servera

22 November 2026 13	Deportivo Alavés	3–1	Deportivo de A Coruña	Vitoria-Gasteiz
13:00 CET (UTC+1)	Pérez 2', (yellow card) 32'; Boyé (penalty missed) 55', 62', (yellow card) 66'; Rebbach (yellow card) 57'; Guevara (yellow card) 89'; Suárez 90'	Report	Navarro (yellow card) 5'; Quagliata (yellow card) 19'; Tenaglia 41' (o.g.); Loureiro (yellow card) 48'; Traoré (yellow card) 56'	Stadium: Mendizorrotza Stadium; Attendance: 17,277; Referee: Víctor García Verdura

29 November 2026 14	Real Madrid CF	v	Deportivo Alavés

6 December 2026 15	Deportivo Alavés	v	RCD Espanyol

13 December 2026 16	Levante UD	v	Deportivo Alavés

20 December 2026 17	Deportivo Alavés	v	Elche CF

3 January 2027 18	Real Betis	v	Deportivo Alavés

10 January 2027 19	Deportivo Alavés	v	Real Sociedad

17 January 2027 20	Villarreal CF	v	Deportivo Alavés

24 January 2027 21	Deportivo Alavés	v	FC Barcelona

31 January 2027 22	Málaga CF	v	Deportivo Alavés

7 February 2027 23	Deportivo Alavés	v	Celta

14 February 2027 24	Valencia CF	v	Deportivo Alavés

21 February 2027 25	Deportivo Alavés	v	Racing de Santander

28 February 2027 26	Getafe	v	Deportivo Alavés

7 March 2027 27	Deportivo Alavés	v	Athletic Bilbao

14 March 2027 28	Deportivo Alavés	v	Sevilla FC

21 March 2027 29	Real Sociedad	v	Deportivo Alavés

4 April 2027 30	Elche	v	Deportivo Alavés

11 April 2027 31	Deportivo Alavés	v	Real Betis

18 April 2027 32	Deportivo Alavés	v	Rayo Vallecano

21 April 2027 33	CA Osasuna	v	Deportivo Alavés

2 May 2027 34	Atlético Madrid	v	Deportivo Alavés

9 May 2027 35	Deportivo Alavés	v	Levante UD

16 May 2027 36	Deportivo de A Coruña	v	Deportivo Alavés

23 May 2027 37	Deportivo Alavés	v	Real Madrid CF

30 May 2027 38	RCD Espanyol	v	Deportivo Alavés

=== Copa del Rey ===
3 November 2026	Anaitasuna	v	Alavés	Azkoitia
19:00		Report		Stadium: Txerloia
Note: Originally scheduled to 28 October 2026, the match was postponed due to a train collision in Urda.
