= 2025–26 Deportivo Alavés season =

Deportivo Alavés
2025–26 season
- Head coach: Eduardo Coudet (until 3 March); Quique Sánchez Flores (from 3 March)
- Stadium: Mendizorroza
- La Liga: 14th
- Copa del Rey: Quarter-finals
- Top goalscorer: League: Toni Martínez (14); All: Toni Martínez (18)
- Biggest win: Getxo 0–7 Alavés
- Biggest defeat: Osasuna 3–0 Alavés
Home colours	Away colours	Third colours

The 2025–26 season was the 105th season in the history of Deportivo Alavés, and the club's third consecutive season in La Liga. In addition to the domestic league, the club participated in the Copa del Rey.

On 3 March 2026, Alavés manager Eduardo Coudet departed after his contract was terminated, with the club positioned 16th in the league standings. He would be replaced by Quique Sánchez Flores.

== Players ==
=== First-team squad ===
As of 3 February 2026

Note: Flags indicate national team as defined under FIFA eligibility rules; some limited exceptions apply. Players may hold more than one non-FIFA nationality.

No.	Pos.	Nation	Player
1	GK	ESP	Antonio Sivera (captain)
2	DF	ARG	Facundo Garcés
3	DF	MAR	Youssef Enríquez
4	MF	ESP	Denis Suárez
5	DF	ESP	Jon Pacheco (on loan from Real Sociedad)
6	MF	ESP	Ander Guevara (vice-captain)
7	MF	ESP	Ángel Pérez
8	MF	ESP	Antonio Blanco
9	FW	DOM	Mariano Díaz
10	MF	ESP	Carles Aleñá
11	FW	ESP	Toni Martínez
13	GK	ESP	Raúl Fernández

No.	Pos.	Nation	Player
14	DF	ARG	Nahuel Tenaglia (3rd captain)
15	FW	ARG	Lucas Boyé
16	DF	FIN	Ville Koski (on loan from Istra 1961)
17	DF	ESP	Jonny Otto
18	MF	ESP	Jon Guridi
19	MF	ESP	Pablo Ibáñez
20	MF	BRA	Calebe (on loan from Fortaleza)
21	MF	ALG	Abde Rebbach
22	FW	CIV	Ibrahim Diabate (on loan from GAIS)
23	MF	URU	Carlos Protesoni
24	DF	ESP	Víctor Parada
28	MF	ESP	Lander Pinillos

=== Out on loan ===
Note: Flags indicate national team as defined under FIFA eligibility rules; some limited exceptions apply. Players may hold more than one non-FIFA nationality.

No.	Pos.	Nation	Player
—	GK	ARG	Adrián Rodríguez (at Zaragoza until 30 June 2026)
—	GK	GEQ	Jesús Owono (at Andorra until 30 June 2026)
—	DF	ESP	Adrián Pica (at Mirandés until 30 June 2026)
—	DF	ESP	Hugo Novoa (at Mirandés until 30 June 2026)
—	DF	MLI	Moussa Diarra (at Anderlecht until 30 June 2026)
—	DF	SRB	Nikola Maraš (at Mirandés until 30 June 2026)
—	MF	ARG	Gustavo Albarracín (at Istra 1961 until 30 June 2027)

No.	Pos.	Nation	Player
—	MF	ESP	Julen Lartitegi (at Arenas Getxo until 30 June 2026)
—	MF	GUI	Selu Diallo (at Cultural Leonesa until 30 June 2026)
—	MF	ESP	Tomás Mendes (at Alverca until 30 June 2026)
—	FW	ESP	Asier Villalibre (at Racing Santander until 30 June 2026)
—	FW	PAN	José de León (at Barakaldo until 30 June 2026)
—	FW	ESP	Unai Ropero (at Hércules until 30 June 2026)

== Transfers ==
=== In ===
Pos.	Player	Transferred from	Fee	Date	Source
DF	(Morocco) Youssef Enríquez	(Spain) Real Madrid Castilla	Undisclosed	16 July 2025	
MF	(Brazil) Calebe	(Brazil) Fortaleza	Loan	22 July 2025	
FW	(Dominican Republic) Mariano Díaz	Unattached	Free	7 August 2025	
FW	(Argentina) Lucas Boyé	(Spain) Granada	~€6,000,000	22 August 2025	
DF	(Spain) Jon Pacheco	(Spain) Real Sociedad	Loan	25 August 2025	
DF	(Finland) Ville Koski	(Croatia) Istra 1961	Loan	31 January 2026	
FW	(Ivory Coast) Ibrahim Diabate	(Sweden) GAIS	Loan	2 February 2026	

=== Out ===
Pos.	Player	Transferred to	Fee	Date	Source
MF	(Spain) Carlos Vicente	(England) Birmingham City	€8,000,000	27 January 2026	

== Competitions ==
=== La Liga ===
Pos	Team	Pld	W	D	L	GF	GA	GD	Pts
12	Athletic Bilbao	38	13	6	19	43	58	−15	45
13	Sevilla	38	12	7	19	46	60	−14	43 (Note: Head-to-head points: Sevilla 6, Alavés 5, Elche 3.)
14	Alavés	38	11	10	17	44	56	−12	43
15	Elche	38	10	13	15	49	57	−8	43
16	Levante	38	11	9	18	47	61	−14	42 (Note: Head-to-head points: Levante 7, Osasuna 5, Mallorca 3.)

Source: LaLiga EA Sports
Rules for classification: 1) Points; 2) Head-to-head points; 3) Head-to-head goal difference; 4) Goal difference; 5) Goals scored; 6) Fair-play points
(Note: Head-to-head record is used only after all the matches between the teams in question have been played)

==== Results by round ====
Round	1	2	3	4	5	6	7	8	9	10
Ground	H	A	H	A	H	A	A	H	H	A
Result	W	L	D	W	L	D	L	W	D	L
Position										

A = Away; H = Home; W = Win; D = Draw; L = Loss

==== Matches ====
16 August 2025 1	Alavés	2–1	Levante	Vitoria-Gasteiz
21:30

22 August 2025 2	Real Betis	1–0	Alavés	Seville
21:30

30 August 2025 3	Alavés	1–1	Atlético Madrid	Vitoria-Gasteiz
17:00

13 September 2025 4	Athletic Bilbao	0–1	Alavés	Bilbao
18:30

20 September 2025 5	Alavés	1–2	Sevilla	Vitoria-Gasteiz
18:30

24 September 2025 6	Getafe	1–1	Alavés	Getafe
19:00

27 September 2025 7	Mallorca	1–0	Alavés	Palma
18:30

5 October 2025 8	Alavés	3–1	Elche	Vitoria-Gasteiz
14:00

20 October 2025 9	Alavés	0–0	Valencia	Vitoria-Gasteiz
21:00

26 October 2025 10	Rayo Vallecano	1–0	Alavés	Madrid
21:00

2 November 2025 11	Alavés	2–1	Espanyol	Vitoria-Gasteiz
16:15

8 November 2025 12	Girona	1–0	Alavés	Girona
14:00

22 November 2025 13	Alavés	0–1	Celta Vigo	Vitoria-Gasteiz
14:00

29 November 2025 14	Barcelona	3–1	Alavés	Barcelona
16:15

6 December 2025 15	Alavés	1–0	Real Sociedad	Vitoria-Gasteiz
16:15

14 December 2025 16	Alavés	1–2	Real Madrid	Vitoria-Gasteiz
21:00

20 December 2025 17	Osasuna	3–0	Alavés	Pamplona
18:30

4 January 2026 18	Alavés	1–1	Oviedo	Vitoria-Gasteiz
18:30

10 January 2026 19	Villarreal	3–1	Alavés	Villarreal
16:15

18 January 2026 20	Atlético Madrid	1–0	Alavés	Madrid
16:15

25 January 2026 21	Alavés	2–1	Real Betis	Vitoria-Gasteiz
21:00

30 January 2026 22	Espanyol	1–2	Alavés	Cornellà de Llobregat
18:30

8 February 2026 23	Alavés	0–2	Getafe	Vitoria-Gasteiz
14:00

14 February 2026 24	Sevilla	1–1	Alavés	Seville
18:30

23 February 2026 25	Alavés	2–2	Girona	Vitoria-Gasteiz
21:00

27 February 2026 26	Levante	3–2	Alavés	Valencia
21:00

8 March 2026 27	Valencia	3–2	Alavés	Valencia
16:15

13 March 2026 28	Alavés	1–1	Villarreal	Vitoria-Gasteiz
21:00

22 March 2026 29	Celta Vigo	3–4	Alavés	Vigo
16:15

5 April 2026 30	Alavés	2–2	Osasuna	Vitoria-Gasteiz
21:00

11 April 2026 31	Real Sociedad	3–3	Alavés	San Sebastián
14:00	Sučić 14'; Sivera 27' (o.g.); Óskarsson 60'		Ćaleta-Car 3' (o.g.); Diabate 24'; Boyé 90+7'	Stadium: Estadio Municipal de Anoeta; Attendance: 31,024; Referee: Victor García Verdura

21 April 2026 33	Real Madrid	2–1	Alavés	Madrid
21:30	Mbappé 30'; Vinícius 50'		Martínez 90+3'	Stadium: Santiago Bernabéu; Referee: Juan Martínez Munuera

25 April 2026 32	Alavés	2–1	Mallorca	Vitoria-Gasteiz
14:00	Martínez 56', 69'		Virgili 19'	Stadium: Campo de fútbol de Mendizorroza; Referee: Javier Alberola Rojas

3 May 2026 33	Deportivo Alavés	2–4	Athletic Bilbao	Mendizorrotza Stadium
18:30	Blanco 8'; Tenaglia 68'	Report	Navarro 46'; Sancet 74'; N Williams 83', 87'	Attendance: 19,125; Referee: Alejandro Quintero González

9 May 2026 35	Elche	1–1	Alavés	Elche
14:00				Stadium: Estadio Martínez Valero

36	Alavés	1–0	Barcelona

37	Real Oviedo	0–1	Alavés

38	Alavés	1–2	Rayo Vallecano

=== Copa del Rey ===
30 October 2025 First round	Getxo	0–7	Alavés
20:00

2 December 2025 Second round	Portugalete	0–3	Alavés
19:00

17 December 2025 Round of 32	Alavés	1–0	Sevilla	Vitoria-Gasteiz
21:00

14 January 2026 Round of 16	Alavés	2–0	Rayo Vallecano	Vitoria-Gasteiz
21:00

4 February 2026 Quarter-finals	Alavés	2–3	Real Sociedad	Vitoria-Gasteiz
21:00

== Statistics ==
=== Goalscorers ===
Rank.	Pos.	Player	La Liga	Copa del Rey	Total
1	FW	(Spain) Toni Martínez	11	4	15
2	FW	(Argentina) Lucas Boyé	11	0	11
3	MF	(Spain) Carlos Vicente	5	5	10
4	FW	(Dominican Republic) Mariano Díaz	0	3	3
5	MF	(Algeria) Abderrahman Rebbach	1	1	2
