= 2024–25 Deportivo Alavés season =

Deportivo Alavés
2024–25 season
- President: Alfonso Fernández de Trocóniz
- Head coach: Luis García (until 2 December); Eduardo Coudet (from 2 December)
- Stadium: Mendizorrotza
- La Liga: 15th
- Copa del Rey: Second round
- Top goalscorer: League: Kike García (13); All: Kike García (15)
- Highest home attendance: 19,468
- Average home league attendance: 17,318
Home colours	Away colours	Third colours

The 2024–25 season was the 104th season in the history of Deportivo Alavés, and the club's second consecutive season in La Liga. In addition to the domestic league, the club participated in the Copa del Rey.

== Players ==
=== First-team squad ===
As of 4 February 2025

Note: Flags indicate national team as defined under FIFA eligibility rules; some limited exceptions apply. Players may hold more than one non-FIFA nationality.

No.	Pos.	Nation	Player
1	GK	ESP	Antonio Sivera (captain)
2	DF	ARG	Facundo Garcés
3	DF	ESP	Manu Sánchez (on loan from Celta Vigo)
4	DF	SRB	Aleksandar Sedlar
5	DF	MAR	Abdel Abqar
6	MF	ESP	Ander Guevara (vice-captain)
7	MF	ESP	Carlos Vicente
8	MF	ESP	Antonio Blanco
9	FW	ESP	Asier Villalibre
10	MF	ARG	Tomás Conechny
11	FW	ESP	Toni Martínez
12	DF	URU	Santiago Mouriño

No.	Pos.	Nation	Player
13	GK	GEQ	Jesús Owono
14	DF	ARG	Nahuel Tenaglia (3rd captain)
15	FW	ESP	Carlos Martín (on loan from Atlético Madrid)
16	DF	ESP	Hugo Novoa
17	FW	ESP	Kike García
18	MF	ESP	Jon Guridi
19	FW	ESP	Pau Cabanes (on loan from Villarreal)
21	MF	ESP	Carles Aleñá (on loan from Getafe)
22	DF	MLI	Moussa Diarra
23	MF	URU	Carlos Protesoni
24	MF	ESP	Joan Jordán (on loan from Sevilla)
31	GK	ARG	Adrián Rodríguez

=== Out on loan ===
Note: Flags indicate national team as defined under FIFA eligibility rules; some limited exceptions apply. Players may hold more than one non-FIFA nationality.

No.	Pos.	Nation	Player
—	DF	ESP	Joseda Álvarez (at Sestao River until 30 June 2025)
—	DF	SRB	Nikola Maraš (at Sporting Gijón until 30 June 2025)
—	DF	CMR	Stephane Keller (at Istra 1961 until 30 June 2025)
—	DF	ESP	Víctor Parada (at Mirandés until 30 June 2025)

No.	Pos.	Nation	Player
—	MF	GUI	Selu Diallo (at Atlético Madrid B until 30 June 2025)
—	FW	ESP	Unai Ropero (at Eldense until 30 June 2025)
—	FW	ARG	Joaquín Panichelli (at Mirandés until 30 June 2025)
—	FW	ALG	Abde Rebbach (at Granada until 30 June 2025)

== Transfers ==
=== In ===
Pos.	Player	Transferred from	Fee	Date	Source
MF	(Mauritania) Abdallahi Mahmoud	(Switzerland) AC Bellinzona	Loan return	30 June 2024	
MF	(Equatorial Guinea) Álex Balboa	(Spain) Huesca	Loan return	30 June 2024	
MF	(Argentina) Tomás Conechny	(Argentina) Godoy Cruz		5 July 2024	
FW	(Spain) Asier Villalibre	(Spain) Athletic Bilbao	€1,000,000	15 July 2024	
MF	(Spain) Stoichkov	(Spain) Eibar	€1,000,000	17 July 2024	
DF	(Mali) Moussa Diarra	(France) Toulouse	Free	18 July 2024	
DF	(Spain) Hugo Novoa	(Germany) RB Leipzig	€1,500,000	22 July 2024	
DF	(Spain) Manu Sánchez	(Spain) Celta Vigo	Loan	23 July 2024	
MF	(Argentina) Luka Romero	(Italy) AC Milan	Loan	23 July 2024	
MF	(Spain) Joan Jordán	(Spain) Sevilla	Loan	29 August 2024	

=== Out ===
Pos.	Player	Transferred to	Fee	Date	Source
DF	(Spain) Andoni Gorosabel	(Spain) Athletic Bilbao	End of contract	1 July 2024	
FW	(Spain) Miguel de la Fuente	(Spain) CD Leganés	€2,000,000	1 July 2024	
MF	(Equatorial Guinea) Álex Balboa	(Netherlands) Almere City FC		4 July 2024	
DF	(Spain) Rubén Duarte	(Mexico) Pumas UNAM	€4,000,000	9 July 2024	
FW	(Spain) Alan Godoy	(Spain) Eldense	Undisclosed	14 July 2024	
DF	(Spain) Javi López	(Spain) Real Sociedad	€6,500,000	21 July 2024	
MF	(Spain) Luis Rioja	(Spain) Valencia	€1,500,000	22 August 2024	
MF	(Mauritania) Abdallahi Mahmoud	(Kuwait) Al-Arabi	Undisclosed	4 September 2024	

== Friendlies ==
=== Pre-season ===
17 July 2024 Friendly	Racing Santander	0–0	Alavés	Santander
19:00				Stadium: Campos de Sport de El Sardinero

20 July 2024 XXII Trofeo Villa de Laguardia	Real Sociedad	1–1 (5–6 p)	Alavés	Laguardia
18:00	Méndez 30'		García 12'	Stadium: Campo de Futbol El Prao; Referee: Aimar Velasco Arbaiza
	Penalties
	Sadiq (penalty missed); Olasagasti (penalty scored); Goti (penalty scored); Rupérez (penalty missed); Dadie (penalty scored); Odriozola (penalty missed); Gorrotxategi (penalty scored); Gómez (penalty scored); Ochieng (penalty missed)		(penalty scored) Panichelli; (penalty scored) Rebbach; (penalty missed) Benavídez; (penalty missed) Maraš; (penalty scored) Rioja; (penalty missed) Owono; (penalty scored) Doumbia; (penalty scored) Parada; (penalty scored) Mahmoud

27 July 2024 Friendly	Levante	1–1	Alavés	La Nucia
19:30	Bouldini 36'		Stoichkov 19'	Stadium: Estadi Olímpic Camilo Cano

30 July 2024 Friendly	Alavés	2–1	Tenerife	Alicante
19:00	Conechny 51'; Villalibre 82'		Juande 48'	Stadium: El Albir; Referee: Muresan Muresan

2 August 2024 Friendly	Hércules	1–0	Alavés	Alicante
19:30	Alvarito 14'	Report		Stadium: Estadio José Rico Pérez

7 August 2024 Friendly	Alavés	1–1	Huesca	Vitoria-Gasteiz
18:30				Stadium: Ciudad Deportiva José Luis Compañón

10 August 2024 Friendly	Osasuna	1–2	Alavés	Tajonar
19:00				Stadium: Instalaciones Deportivas de Tajonar

== Competitions ==
=== Overall record ===
Competition	First match	Last match	Starting round	Final position	Record							
Competition	First match	Last match	Starting round	Final position	Pld	W	D	L	GF	GA	GD	Win %
La Liga	16 August 2024	24 May 2025	Matchday 1	15th	38	10	12	16	38	48	−10	26.32
Copa del Rey	29 October 2024	5 December 2024	First round	Second round	2	1	1	0	3	2	+1	50.00
Total					40	11	13	16	41	50	−9	27.50

Source: Soccerway

=== La Liga ===
==== League table ====
Pos	Team	Pld	W	D	L	GF	GA	GD	Pts
13	Getafe	38	11	9	18	34	39	−5	42 (Note: Head-to-head points: Getafe 9, Espanyol 9, Alavés 0.)
14	Espanyol	38	11	9	18	40	51	−11	42
15	Alavés	38	10	12	16	38	48	−10	42
16	Girona	38	11	8	19	44	60	−16	41 (Note: Girona finished ahead of Sevilla on head-to-head goal difference: Sevilla 0–2 Girona, Girona 1–2 Sevilla.)
17	Sevilla	38	10	11	17	42	55	−13	41

Source: LaLiga EA Sports
Rules for classification: 1) Points; 2) Head-to-head points; 3) Head-to-head goal difference; 4) Goal difference; 5) Goals scored; 6) Fair-play points
(Note: Head-to-head record is used only after all the matches between the teams in question have been played)

==== Results summary ====
Overall								Home						Away					
Pld	W	D	L	GF	GA	GD	Pts	W	D	L	GF	GA	GD	W	D	L	GF	GA	GD
38	10	12	16	38	48	−10	42	6	6	7	14	17	−3	4	6	9	24	31	−7

==== Results by round ====
Round	1	2	3	4	5	6	7	8	9	10	11	12	13	14	15	16	17	18	19	20	21	22	23	24	25	26	27	28	29	30	31	32	33	34
Ground	A	H	A	H	A	H	A	A	H	H	A	H	A	A	H	A	H	A	H	A	H	A	H	A	H	A	H	A	H	A	H	A	H	
Result	L	D	W	W	L	W	L	L	L	L	L	W	L	L	D	D	D	D	L	W	D	L	L	D	L	D	W	D	L	W	L	D	W	
Position	17	17	10	6	8	6	8	11	13	14	16	14	15	16	16	16	17	16	17	17	17	18	19	19	19	19	18	17	17	17	17	18	17	

Updated to match(es) played on 24 April 2025. Source: La Liga
A = Away; H = Home; W = Win; D = Draw; L = Loss

==== Matches ====
The league schedule was released on 18 June 2024.

16 August 2024 1	Celta Vigo	2–1	Alavés	Vigo
19:00 CEST (UTC+2)	Aspas (yellow card) 9', (goal) 84'; Swedberg 66'	Report	Kike 17'; Conechny (yellow card) 45+2'	Stadium: Balaídos; Attendance: 22,477; Referee: Alejandro Quintero González

25 August 2024 2	Alavés	0–0	Real Betis	Vitoria-Gasteiz
19:15 CEST (UTC+2)	Sedlar (yellow card) 4', (red card) 86'	Report	Juanmi (yellow card) 27'; Perraud (yellow card) 64'; Roca (yellow card) 77'; Ávila (yellow card) 89'	Stadium: Mendizorrotza; Attendance: 16,623; Referee: Mateo Busquets Ferrer

28 August 2024 3	Real Sociedad	1–2	Alavés	San Sebastián
21:30 CEST (UTC+2)	Pacheco (yellow card) 16'; Oyarzabal (red card) 29'; Méndez 32'; Zubeldia (yellow card) 36'; Kubo (yellow card) 90+7'; Martín (yellow card) 90+7'	Report	Villalibre 45+5' (pen.); Stoichkov (yellow card) 48'; Abde (yellow card) 51'; Martínez 77'; Sivera (yellow card) 90'; Sánchez (yellow card) 90+7'	Stadium: Reale Arena; Attendance: 32,220; Referee: José María Sánchez Martínez

1 September 2024 4	Alavés	2–0	Las Palmas	Vitoria-Gasteiz
17:00	Vicente 7'; Guridi (yellow card) 32'; Conechny (yellow card) 45'; Martínez 78'; Abqar (yellow card) 83'	Report		Stadium: Mendizorrotza; Attendance: 16,386; Referee: Víctor García Verdura

14 September 2024 5	Espanyol	3–2	Alavés	Cornellà de Llobregat
16:15	Puado 21', 56', 63' (pen.); Kumbulla (yellow card) 48'; El Hilali (yellow card) 54'	Report	Abqar (yellow card) 29'; Conechny 35'; Sivera (yellow card) 61'; Tenaglia 68'; Sánchez (yellow card) 76'; García (yellow card) 90+2'	Stadium: Stage Front Stadium; Attendance: 24,238; Referee: Juan Luis Pulido Santana

20 September 2024 6	Alavés	2–1	Sevilla	Vitoria-Gasteiz
21:00 CEST (UTC+2)	Vicente 17'; Martín 60'; Guridi (yellow card) 87'	Report	Saúl (yellow card) 33'; Pedrosa (yellow card) 45+1'; Badé (yellow card) 75'; Lukebakio 83'; Salas (yellow card) 90+5'	Stadium: Mendizorrotza; Attendance: 16,538; Referee: Javier Alberola Rojas

24 September 2024 7	Real Madrid	3–2	Alavés	Madrid
21:00 CEST (UTC+2)	Vázquez 1'; Valverde (yellow card) 4'; Vinícius (yellow card) 30'; Mbappé 40'; Rodrygo 48'; Endrick (yellow card) 83'; Modrić (yellow card) 90+6'	Report	Benavídez 85'; Kike 86'	Stadium: Santiago Bernabéu; Attendance: 67,480; Referee: Alejandro Muñiz Ruiz

28 September 2024 8	Getafe	2–0	Alavés	Getafe
14:00 CEST (UTC+2)	Arambarri 42', (yellow card) 78'; Milla 58' (pen.); Sola (yellow card) 67'; Álvaro (yellow card) 90+3'	Report	Abqar (yellow card) 31'; Benavídez (yellow card) 45'; Luis García (yellow card) 45+2'; Sivera (yellow card) 62'; Blanco (yellow card) 70'; Kike (yellow card) 81'; Carlos (yellow card) 90+4'	Stadium: Coliseum; Attendance: 10,006; Referee: Isidro Díaz de Mera Escuderos

6 October 2024 9	Alavés	0–3	Barcelona	Vitoria-Gasteiz
16:15 CEST (UTC+2)	Tenaglia (yellow card) 31'; Mouriño (yellow card) 54'	Report	Lewandowski 7', 22', 32'; Martínez (yellow card) 53'; Martín (yellow card) 86'	Stadium: Mendizorrotza; Attendance: 19,468; Referee: Miguel Ángel Ortiz Arias

20 October 2024 10	Alavés	2–3	Valladolid	Vitoria-Gasteiz
20:00 CEST (UTC+2)	Martínez 6'; Diarra (yellow card) 68'; Sánchez (yellow card) 78'; Tenaglia (yellow card) 80'; Kike 90+7', (yellow card) 90+9' (yellow-red card) 90+9'	Report	Sylla 17' (pen.); Moro (yellow card) 57'; Amallah 72' (pen.); Anuar 76'; Pezzolano (yellow card) 81'; Latasa (yellow card) 90+4'	Stadium: Mendizorrotza; Attendance: 16,904; Referee: Mario Melero López

26 October 2024 11	Rayo Vallecano	1–0	Alavés	Vallecas
15:15 CEST (UTC+2)	Mumin (red card) 22'; Unai López (yellow card) 49'; Sivera 80' (o.g.); Chavarría (yellow card) 90+3'	Report	Sánchez (yellow card) 50'; Diarra (yellow card) 67'; Guridi (yellow card) 77'; Jordán (yellow card) 88'	Stadium: Estadio de Vallecas; Attendance: 13,010; Referee: Adrián Cordero Vega

3 November 2024 12	Alavés	1–0	Mallorca	Vitoria-Gasteiz
21:00 CET (UTC+1)	Kike (yellow card) 10'; Luis García (yellow card) 35' (yellow-red card) 36'; Pica (yellow card) 35'; Abqar (yellow card) 44'; Guridi 76'	Report	Chiquinho (yellow card) 53'; Copete (yellow card) 90+3'	Stadium: Mendizorrotza; Attendance: 17,212; Referee: Pablo González Fuertes

9 November 2024 13	Villarreal	3–0	Alavés	Villarreal
16:15 CEST (UTC+2)	Akhomach 38'; Cardona (yellow card) 45+2'; Parejo 81'; Comesanña 90'	Report	Guevara (yellow card) 62'; Martín (yellow card) 74'; Tenaglia (yellow card) 83'	Stadium: Estadio de la Cerámica; Attendance: 17,659; Referee: Alejandro Quintero González

23 November 2024 14	Atlético Madrid	2–1	Alavés	Madrid
16:15 CEST (UTC+2)	Correa (yellow card) 45+3'; Griezmann 76' (pen.); Sørloth 86'; Alvarez (yellow card) 90'; De Paul (yellow card) 90+6'	Report	Guridi 7' (pen.); Blanco (yellow card) 58'; Sánchez (yellow card) 70'; Conechny (yellow card) 88'	Stadium: Riyadh Air Metropolitano; Attendance: 58,910; Referee: Víctor García Verdura

1 December 2024 15	Alavés	1–1	Leganés	Vitoria-Gasteiz
22:15 CET (UTC+1)	Abqar (yellow card) 80'; Carlos 87'	Report	Javi (yellow card) 27'; Óscar 67'; Neyou (yellow card) 90+3'; Jorge Sáenz (yellow card) 90+4'; Tapia (yellow card) 90+6'	Stadium: Mendizorrotza; Attendance: 16,881; Referee: Isidro Díaz de Mera Escuderos

8 December 2024 16	Osasuna	2–2	Alavés	Pamplona
21:00 CET (UTC+1)	Budimir (yellow card) 3', (goal) 54'; Torró (yellow card) 37'; Barja (yellow card) 45+4'; R. García 61'; Oroz (yellow card) 90+6'; Moncayola (yellow card) 90+7'	Report	Kike 1', 68'; Abqar (yellow card) 23'; Tenaglia (yellow card) 37'; Blanco (yellow card) 60'	Stadium: El Sadar; Attendance: 18,220; Referee: César Soto Grado

15 December 2024 17	Alavés	1–1	Athletic Bilbao	Vitoria-Gasteiz
16:15 CET (UTC+1)	Blanco (yellow card) 54'; Jordán 67'; Tenaglia (yellow card) 69'	Report	Gómez 10'; Boiro (yellow card) 20'; Berchiche (yellow card) 75'	Stadium: Mendizorrotza; Attendance: 19,239; Referee: José María Sánchez Martínez

22 December 2024 18	Valencia	2–2	Alavés	Valencia
14:00 CET (UTC+1)	Rioja 70' (pen.); Mosquera (yellow card) 86'; Gómez 90+8'; Pepelu (yellow card) 90+12'	Report	Martín 7', (yellow card) 22'; Jordán 88' (pen.)	Stadium: Mestalla; Attendance: 37,586; Referee: Javier Alberola Rojas

11 January 2025 19	Alavés	0–1	Girona	Vitoria-Gasteiz
14:00 CET (UTC+1)	Guridi (yellow card) 55'	Report	Danjuma (yellow card) 35'; Herrera (yellow card) 45+2'; Krejčí (yellow card) 49'; Stuani (yellow card) 81'; Solís 90+1'	Stadium: Mendizorrotza; Attendance: 16,454; Referee: Mateo Busquets Ferrer

18 January 2025 20	Real Betis	1–3	Alavés	Seville
18:30 CET (UTC+1)	Rodríguez 28'; Vitor Roque (yellow card) 34'; Llorente (yellow card) 37'; Perraud (red card) 55'; Isco (yellow card) 90+2'; Cardoso (yellow card) 90+4'	Report	Kike 11' (pen.), 80', 84'; Blanco (yellow card) 34'; Abqar (yellow card) 54'; Tenaglia (yellow card) 63'; Conechny (yellow card) 76'; Diarra (yellow card) 82'	Stadium: Benito Villamarín; Attendance: 50,021; Referee: Alejandro Hernández Hernández

27 January 2025 21	Alavés	1–1	Celta Vigo	Vitoria-Gasteiz
21:00 CET (UTC+1)	Kike 6' (pen.), (yellow card) 82'; Abqar (yellow card) 78'	Report	Alonso (yellow card) 34'; Ristić (yellow card) 64'; Durán 66'; Álvarez (yellow card) 81'	Stadium: Mendizorrotza; Attendance: 13,612; Referee: Francisco José Hernández Maeso

2 February 2025 22	Barcelona	1–0	Alavés	Barcelona
14:00 CET (UTC+1)	Gavi (yellow card) 7'; Araújo (yellow card) 34'; Lewandowski 61'; Raphinha (yellow card) 67'; López (yellow card) 89'; Yamal (yellow card) 89'	Report	Tenaglia (yellow card) 55'; Protesoni (yellow card) 65'	Stadium: Estadi Olímpic Lluís Companys; Attendance: 42,900; Referee: José Luis Munuera Montero

9 February 2025 23	Alavés	0–1	Getafe	Vitoria-Gasteiz
19:00 CEST (UTC+2)	Abqar (yellow card) 42'; Villalibre (yellow card) 90+3'	Report	Chrisantus (yellow card) 40'; Arambarri 44' (pen.), (yellow card) 66'; Nyom (yellow card) 67'; Juanmi (yellow card) 70'; Terrats (yellow card) 81'; Soria (yellow card) 85'	Stadium: Mendizorrotza; Attendance: 16,236; Referee: Isidro Díaz de Mera Escuderos

15 February 2025 24	Leganés	3–3	Alavés	Leganés
19:00 CEST (UTC+2)	Raba 10' (pen.), 37' (pen.), (yellow card) 65'; Brašanac (yellow card) 57'; Juan Cruz (yellow card) 67'; Duk (yellow card) 83'; Munir 88', (red card) 90+6'	Report	Diarra (yellow card) 9'; Sánchez (yellow card) 18'; Kike 25'; Sivera (yellow card) 36'; Jordán 50' (pen.), 68'; Mouriño (yellow card) 59'; Abqar (yellow card) 90+10'	Stadium: Municipal de Butarque; Attendance: 10,681; Referee: Pablo González Fuertes

22 February 2025 25	Alavés	0–1	Espanyol	Vitoria-Gasteiz
13:00 CEST (UTC+2)	Tenaglia (yellow card) 7'; Blanco (yellow card) 65'	Report	Lozano (yellow card) 17'; El Hilali (yellow card) 84'; Calero 86'	Stadium: Mendizorrotza; Attendance: 17,068; Referee: Juan Luis Pulido Santana

2 March 2025 26	Mallorca	1–1	Alavés	Palma de Mallorca
17:30 CEST (UTC+2)	Asano 9'	Report	Aleñá (yellow card) 64'; Kike 68'; Mouriño (yellow card) 78'	Stadium: Estadi Mallorca Son Moix; Attendance: 17,702; Referee: César Soto Grado

8 March 2025 27	Alavés	1–0	Villarreal	Vitoria-Gasteiz
16:15	Sánchez 11'; Sivera (red card) 58'; Blanco (yellow card) 77' (yellow-red card) 90+4'; Adrián (yellow card) 90+1'; Diarra (yellow card) 90+2'	Report	Pino (yellow card) 70'	Stadium: Mendizorrotza; Attendance: 16,582; Referee: Miguel Ortiz Arias

14 March 2025 28	Las Palmas	2–2	Alavés	Las Palmas
21:00	Muñoz (yellow card) 5'; Sandro (yellow card) 49'; Silva 90' (pen.); D. Martínez (yellow card) 90'; Januzaj (yellow card) 90+3'; Moleiro 90+5'; Suarez (yellow card) 90+7'; Fuster (yellow card) 90+10'	Report	Jordán (yellow card) 4'; Martínez (yellow card) 7', (goal) 45+1'; Guridi 63'; Tenaglia (yellow card) 80'; Coudet (yellow card) 90'; Villalibre (yellow card) 90+9'	Stadium: Estadio Gran Canaria; Attendance: 17,566; Referee: Mario Melero López

29 March 2025 29	Alavés	0–2	Rayo Vallecano	Vitoria-Gasteiz
18:30	Jordán (penalty missed) 14'; Cabanes (yellow card) 16'; Mouriño (yellow card) 77'; Tenaglia (yellow card) 80'	Report	Pathé Ciss 2'; Pelayo (yellow card) 8'; Nteka (yellow card) 36'; Díaz 58'; Batalla (yellow card) 62'; Aridane (yellow card) 78'	Stadium: Mendizorrotza; Attendance: 18,336; Referee: José Munuera Montero

5 April 2025 30	Girona	0-1	Alavés	Girona
14:00	Gazzaniga (yellow card) 90+5'	Report	Guridi (yellow card) 58'; Vicente 61'; Abqar (yellow card) 65'; Sivera (yellow card) 87'; Blanco (yellow card) 89'	Stadium: Montilivi; Attendance: 11,384; Referee: Alejandro Muñiz Ruiz

13 April 2025 31	Alavés	0-1	Real Madrid	Vitoria-Gasteiz
16:15	Jordán (yellow card) 42'; Martín (yellow card) 55'; Sánchez (red card) 70'; Tenaglia (yellow card) 77'; Mouriño (yellow card) 90+8'	Report	Camavinga 34', (yellow card) 80'; Mbappé (red card) 38'; Vázquez (yellow card) 88'; Vinícius (yellow card) 90+5'; Courtois (yellow card) 90+7'	Stadium: Mendizorrotza; Attendance: 19,438; Referee: César Soto Grado

20 April 2025 32	Sevilla	1-1	Alavés	Seville
16:30	Gudelj (yellow card) 10'; Peque 12'; Suso (yellow card) 90+4'	Report	Guridi (yellow card) 42'; Kike 45+2'; Diarra (yellow card) 86'	Stadium: Ramón Sánchez Pizjuán; Attendance: 36,436; Referee: Miguel Ortiz Arias

23 April 2025 33	Alavés	1–0	Real Sociedad	Vitoria-Gasteiz
20:30	Vicente (yellow card) 36'; Conechny (yellow card) 47'; Tenaglia 65'; Sivera (yellow card) 90+1'; Blanco (yellow card) 90+2'	Report	Aramburu (yellow card) 30'; Mariezkurrena (yellow card) 80'; Óskarsson (yellow card) 90+1'; Sučić (yellow card) 90+2'; Elustondo (yellow card) 90+5'	Stadium: Mendizorrotza; Attendance: 17,049; Referee: Mateo Busquets Ferrer

3 May 2025 34	Alavés	0–0	Atlético Madrid	Vitoria-Gasteiz

11 May 2025 35	Athletic Bilbao	1–0	Alavés	Bilbao

14 May 2025 36	Alavés	1–0	Valencia	Vitoria-Gasteiz

18 May 2025 37	Valladolid	0–1	Alavés	Valladolid

24 May 2025 38	Alavés	1–1	Osasuna	Vitoria-Gasteiz

=== Copa del Rey ===
29 October 2024 First round	Compostela	0–1	Alavés	Santiago de Compostela
19:00 UTC+1	Landeira (yellow card) 61'	Report	Vidal Blanco 12' (o.g.); Guevara (yellow card) 45'; Mouriño (yellow card) 47'; Romero (yellow card) 69'	Stadium: Estadio Verónica Boquete de San Lázaro; Attendance: 7.400; Referee: Mateo Busquets Ferrer

5 December 2024 Second round	Minera	2–2 (a.e.t.) (4–2 p)	Alavés	Cartagena (Note: Minera did not play the match in their main stadium Municipal Ángel Celdrán, Llano del Beal, as it did not meet the broadcasting requirements.)
21:00	Mas 33'; Monty (yellow card) 73'; Javi Vera (yellow card) 90+2'; Baradji 105+2'	Report	Kike 60', 108' (pen.); Blanco (yellow card) 79'	Stadium: Cartagonova; Attendance: 6.400; Referee: Juan Martínez Munuera
	Penalties
	Britos (penalty scored); Sanchís (penalty scored); Vera (penalty scored); Mas (penalty scored)		(penalty scored) Jordán; (penalty missed) Abde; (penalty missed) Protesoni; (penalty scored) Conechny
