= Grégoire Świderski =

Canadian soccer player (born 2005)

Personal information
- Full name: Grégoire Jean Stanislas Świderski
- Date of birth: 5 October 2005 (age 21)
- Place of birth: Bruges, France
- Height: 1.90 m (6 ft 3 in)
- Position: Goalkeeper

Team information
- Current team: Alavés B
- Number: 1

Youth career
- 2017–2023: Bordeaux

Senior career*
Years	Team	Apps	(Gls)
2023–2024	Bordeaux	0	(0)
2024–	Alavés B	58	(0)

International career^{‡}
2024	Canada U20	6	(0)
- * Club domestic league appearances and goals as of October 10, 2026 ‡ National team caps and goals as of 30 July 2024

Grégoire Jean Stanislas Świderski (born October 5, 2005) is a professional soccer player who plays as a goalkeeper for Alavés B. Born in France near Bordeaux, he represents Canada at youth level.

== Club career ==
Świderski joined the youth academy of Bordeaux at the age of 12. On 22 May 2023, he signed a pro-trainee contract with Bordeaux until 2025. In 2023, Świderski started training with the senior squad and started in a couple preseason friendlies.

On 30 August 2024, he joined Alavés B on a free transfer on a contract until 2027.

== International career ==
Świderski was born in France to a Canadian father and a French mother. He has two older sisters. Świderski is of Polish descent through his paternal grandfather. He was called up to the Canada U20s for the 2024 CONCACAF U-20 Championship. Świderski was called up to the senior Canada national team for a set of friendlies in June 2024.

== Career statistics ==
As of match played October 10, 2026

Appearances and goals by club, season and competition
Club	Season	League			Cup		Europe		Other		Total	
Club	Season	Division	Apps	Goals	Apps	Goals	Apps	Goals	Apps	Goals	Apps	Goals
Alavés B	2024–25	Segunda Federación	26	0	—		—		—		26	0
Alavés B	2025–26	Segunda Federación	30	0	—		—		—		30	0
Alavés B	2026–27	Segunda Federación	2	0	—		—		—		2	0
Alavés B	Total		58	0	—		—		—		58	0
Alavés	2024–25	La Liga	0	0	—		—		—		0	0
Alavés	2025–26	La Liga	0	0	0	0	—		—		0	0
Alavés	2026–27	La Liga	0	0	0	0	—		—		0	0
Alavés	Total		0	0	0	0	—		—		0	0
Career total			58	0	0	0	0	0	0	0	58	0
