= Víctor Parada =

Spanish footballer (born 2003)

Personal information
- Full name: Víctor Parada González
- Date of birth: 4 April 2002 (age 24)
- Place of birth: Madrid, Spain
- Height: 1.87 m (6 ft 2 in)
- Positions: Centre-back; left-back

Team information
- Current team: Spartak Moscow
- Number: 33

Youth career
- 2011–2014: Atlético Madrid
- 2014–2018: Rayo Vallecano
- 2018–2020: FC Red Bull Salzburg
- 2020–2021: Alavés

Senior career*
Years	Team	Apps	(Gls)
2020–2024	Alavés B	31	(1)
2021–2022	→ San Ignacio (loan)	34	(2)
2022–2023	→ Real Unión (loan)	33	(0)
2023–2026	Alavés	32	(0)
2024–2025	→ Mirandés (loan)	34	(0)
2026–	Spartak Moscow	12	(1)
- * Club domestic league appearances and goals as of 22 November 2026

Víctor Parada González (born 4 April 2002) is a Spanish professional footballer who plays as either a centre-back or a left-back for Russian club Spartak Moscow.

== Career ==
Parada is a youth product of Atlético Madrid and Rayo Vallecano, and finished his youth development in Austria with FC Red Bull Salzburg from 2018 to 2020. On 10 August 2020, he transferred to Deportivo Alavés, playing for the Juvenil squad before making his senior debut with the reserves.

Parada spent the 2021–22 season with farm team Club San Ignacio in the Tercera División RFEF. On 1 August 2022, he moved to Real Unión on loan in the Primera Federación for the 2022–23 season, before returning to Alavés in July 2023 and being assigned back to the B-team.

On 6 December 2023, Parada made his first team debut with the Babazorros, starting in a 1–0 Copa del Rey win over Terrassa FC. Eight days later, he extended his contract with the club until 2026.

Parada made his La Liga debut on 12 January 2024, replacing Carlos Vicente late into a 3–2 away win over Sevilla FC. On 11 August, he was loaned to Segunda División side CD Mirandés for the entire 2024–25 campaign.

Regularly used during his loan, Parada returned to Alavés in July 2025, and further extended his link until 2029 on 9 August. He subsequently established himself as a first-choice, appearing in 33 matches during the season.

On 14 July 2026, Parada signed a four-year contract with Russian Premier League club FC Spartak Moscow.

== Career statistics ==
As of 22 November 2026

Club	Season	League			Cup		Other		Total	
Club	Season	Division	Apps	Goals	Apps	Goals	Apps	Goals	Apps	Goals
Liefering	2018–19	2. Liga	0	0	—		—		0	0
Alavés B	2020–21	Segunda División B	4	0	—		—		4	0
Alavés B	2023–24	Segunda Federación	27	1	—		—		27	1
Alavés B	Total		31	1	0	0	0	0	31	1
San Ignacio	2021–22	Tercera Federación	34	2	—		—		34	2
Real Unión (loan)	2022–23	Primera Federación	33	0	0	0	4 (Note: Appearances in Copa Federación)	0	37	0
Alavés	2023–24	La Liga	2	0	2	0	—		4	0
Alavés	2025–26	La Liga	30	0	3	0	—		33	0
Alavés	Total		32	0	5	0	0	0	37	0
Mirandés (loan)	2024–25	Segunda División	34	0	1	0	4 (Note: Appearances in promotion play-offs)	0	39	0
Spartak Moscow	2026–27	Russian Premier League	12	1	5	0	0	0	17	1
Career total			176	4	11	0	8	0	195	4
