= Mariano Díaz =

Association football player (born 1993)

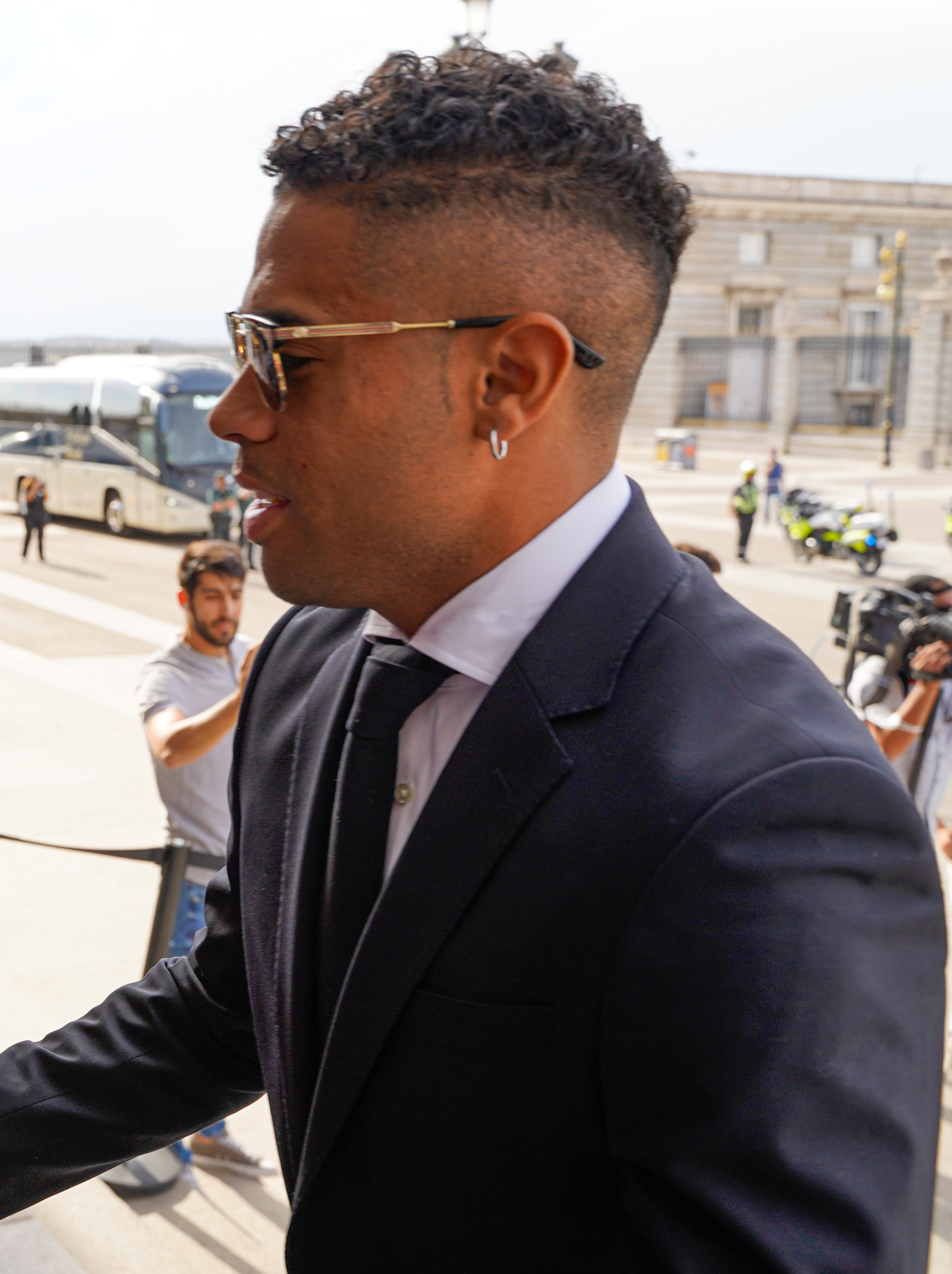
- Mariano with Real Madrid in 2022

Personal information
- Full name: Mariano Díaz Mejía
- Date of birth: 1 August 1993 (age 33)
- Place of birth: Premià de Mar, Spain
- Height: 1.80 m (5 ft 11 in)
- Position: Forward

Team information
- Current team: Alavés
- Number: 9

Youth career
- 2002–2006: Espanyol
- 2006–2008: Premià
- 2008–2009: Sánchez Llibre
- 2009–2011: Badalona
- 2011–2012: Real Madrid

Senior career*
Years	Team	Apps	(Gls)
2011	Badalona	3	(0)
2012–2014	Real Madrid C	46	(18)
2014–2016	Real Madrid B	44	(32)
2016–2017	Real Madrid	8	(1)
2017–2018	Lyon	37	(18)
2018–2023	Real Madrid	52	(6)
2023–2024	Sevilla	9	(0)
2025–	Alavés	21	(4)

International career^{‡}
2013–	Dominican Republic	7	(5)
- * Club domestic league appearances and goals as of 4 November 2026 ‡ National team caps and goals as of 1 October 2026

Mariano Díaz Mejía (Spanish pronunciation: [maˈɾjano ˈði.aθ meˈxi.a]; born 1 August 1993), better known as Mariano, is a professional footballer who plays as a forward for La Liga club Alavés. Born in Spain, he plays for the Dominican Republic national team.

Shortly after making his debut for Badalona in 2011, Mariano joined Real Madrid, where he played in the C-team and then the reserves, where he was top scorer in the 2015–16 Segunda División B. He then began playing with the first team, and was part of their squad that won La Liga, the UEFA Champions League and the FIFA Club World Cup in 2016–17. He was subsequently signed by Ligue 1 club Lyon.

== Club career ==
=== Early career ===
Born in Premià de Mar, Barcelona, Catalonia, Mariano began his youth career with local side RCD Espanyol, and appeared for lowly CE Premià and Fundació Sánchez Llibre. In 2009, he joined CF Badalona, and made his senior debut on 21 August 2011, replacing Iñaki Goikoetxea for the final 21 minutes of a 1–0 loss at CD Teruel in the Segunda División B season; he made two more appearances off the bench. On the 31st, he made his first start, playing the entirety of a 3–1 loss at RB Linense in that season's Copa del Rey, scoring his team's consolation.

=== Real Madrid ===
==== Youth and Castilla ====
Shortly after, Mariano signed with Real Madrid, returning to youth football. In August 2012 he was promoted to the Madrilenian side's C-team also in the third level. He became a regular in his second season there, scoring 15 goals in 26 matches, including a hat-trick on 22 December 2013 in a 5–2 home win over Sestao River Club. The following 18 January, Mariano made his professional debut at the Estadio Alfredo Di Stéfano, appearing with the reserves in a 1–2 loss against Sporting de Gijón in the Segunda División; he came on for the final five minutes in place of Raúl de Tomás.

In 2014–15, with Castilla now in the third tier, Mariano was indefinitely promoted to the team. He made ten appearances, six from the bench, and scored five times. On 29 March, he entered late in De Tomás' place again and scored twice to cap a 5–1 home win over UD Las Palmas B, while one week later, he was given a start at lowly UB Conquense and struck both goals in a seven-minute span. On 24 October 2015, Mariano scored all of his team's goals in a 3–1 home win over UD Socuéllamos, and repeated this on 8 November in a 3–2 win against CF Fuenlabrada. The following 17 April, he scored his third treble of the season, scoring all of the goals – two penalties – in a home win over SD Gernika Club which put Castilla top. He scored his 25th goal of the season in a 6–1 win over La Roda CF on the last day of the season, making him the season's top scorer and winning the group at the expense of Barakaldo CF.

==== 2016–17: Entrance in the first squad ====
Mariano was definitively promoted to the main squad by manager Zinedine Zidane on 20 August 2016, after a back injury to striker Karim Benzema. One week later, Mariano made his senior debut during a 2–1 win over Celta de Vigo, replacing Álvaro Morata in the 77th minute. On 26 October, again from the bench, he scored his first goal for the Merengues to conclude a 7–1 win at Cultural y Deportiva Leonesa in the Copa del Rey. In the second leg, he added a hat-trick for a 13–2 aggregate win, including a 23rd-second goal that was his team's fastest goal in the competition. Mariano scored his first top-flight goal on 10 December, equalising in a 3–2 comeback victory at home to Deportivo de La Coruña. Later that month, he was part of the squad that won the 2016 FIFA Club World Cup in Japan, but did not appear in either of Real Madrid's matches. Mariano made eight appearances when Madrid won the 2016–17 La Liga. He was a back-up when Madrid won the 2016–17 UEFA Champions League.

=== Lyon ===
On 30 June 2017, Mariano signed for Olympique Lyonnais. The fee was reported as €8 million plus 35% interest on the capital gain of a potential future transfer. He made his debut on 5 August in the first match of the 2017–18 Ligue 1 season against RC Strasbourg Alsace, scoring twice in a 4–0 home win. He totalled 18 goals for the league season, forming a prolific attacking trio alongside Memphis Depay and Nabil Fekir (19 and 18 goals respectively).

=== Return to Real Madrid ===
On 29 August 2018, Real Madrid announced they had signed Mariano on a five-year contract. As the Spanish club already owned 35% of his playing rights, the fee was reduced to €23 million. He was given the number 7 shirt, previously worn by Cristiano Ronaldo. His second debut was on 19 September, coming on as a 73rd-minute substitute against A.S. Roma in the first fixture of the 2018–19 UEFA Champions League group stage, and he scored the last goal of a 3–0 victory with a curved shot from outside the penalty area. On 1 March 2020, having just came off the bench for his first league appearance of the season, he scored with his first touch of the ball in the 90th minute of a 2–0 El Clásico victory. He made five appearances during the league season, as Real Madrid won the 2019–20 La Liga. In July 2020, Mariano tested positive for COVID-19.

On 3 June 2023, Real Madrid announced that Mariano would leave the club at the expiration of his contract on 30 June 2023.

=== Sevilla ===
On 1 September 2023, Mariano signed for fellow La Liga club Sevilla FC on a free transfer.

=== Alavés ===
In July 2025, after more than a year as a free agent, Mariano joined Deportivo Alavés on trial. On 7 August, after playing in the pre-season, he signed a two-year contract with the club.

On 15 August 2026, Mariano scored his first league goal for Alavés (and his first in 5 seasons) in their opening game of the season against Getafe with a superb finish into the top right corner. He also assisted the other 2 goals in a dominant 3–0 win.

== International career ==
Mariano is eligible for the Dominican Republic through his mother, a native of San Juan de la Maguana. He made his international debut on 24 March 2013 in a friendly against neighbours Haiti, and scored the last goal of a 3–1 victory. He later retired from the national team to focus on his career at Real Madrid and also to avoid being cap-tied with the Dominican Republic, in view of a possible call up for the Spain national team. In December 2017, Spain manager Julen Lopetegui said he was monitoring Mariano for a call-up. In March 2025, he was called up to the Dominican Republic national team after 303 days without playing a club match.

== Career statistics ==
=== Club ===
As of match played 19 September 2026

Appearances and goals by club, season and competition
Club	Season	League			National cup (Note: Includes Copa del Rey, Coupe de France)		Europe		Other		Total	
Club	Season	Division	Apps	Goals	Apps	Goals	Apps	Goals	Apps	Goals	Apps	Goals
Badalona	2011–12	Segunda División B	3	0	1	1	—		—		4	1
Real Madrid C	2012–13	Segunda División B	20	3	—		—		—		20	3
Real Madrid C	2013–14	Segunda División B	26	15	—		—		—		26	15
Real Madrid C	Total		46	18	—		—		—		46	18
Real Madrid Castilla	2013–14	Segunda División	1	0	—		—		—		1	0
Real Madrid Castilla	2014–15	Segunda División B	10	5	—		—		—		10	5
Real Madrid Castilla	2015–16	Segunda División B	33	27	—		—		4 (Note: Appearances in Segunda División B play-offs)	2	37	29
Real Madrid Castilla	Total		44	32	—		—		4	2	48	34
Real Madrid	2016–17	La Liga	8	1	5	4	1 (Note: Appearance(s) in UEFA Champions League)	0	—		14	5
Lyon	2017–18	Ligue 1	34	18	2	1	9 (Note: Appearances in UEFA Europa League)	2	—		45	21
Lyon	2018–19	Ligue 1	3	0	0	0	0	0	—		3	0
Lyon	Total		37	18	2	1	9	2	—		48	21
Real Madrid	2018–19	La Liga	13	3	1	0	5	1	—		19	4
Real Madrid	2019–20	La Liga	5	1	2	0	0	0	0	0	7	1
Real Madrid	2020–21	La Liga	16	1	1	0	4	0	1 (Note: Appearance in Supercopa de España)	0	22	1
Real Madrid	2021–22	La Liga	9	1	1	0	1	0	0	0	11	1
Real Madrid	2022–23	La Liga	9	0	0	0	1	0	1 (Note: Appearance in FIFA Club World Cup)	0	11	0
Real Madrid	Real Madrid total		60	7	10	4	12	1	2	0	84	12
Sevilla	2023–24	La Liga	9	0	1	0	3	0	0	0	13	0
Alavés	2025–26	La Liga	10	0	2	3	—		—		12	3
Alavés	2026–27	La Liga	11	4	0	0	—		—		11	4
Alavés	Total		21	4	2	3	—		—		23	7
Career total			220	79	15	9	24	3	6	2	265	93

=== International ===
As of match played 1 October 2026

Appearances and goals by national team and year
National team	Year	Apps	Goals
Dominican Republic	2013	1	1
Dominican Republic	2025	1	1
Dominican Republic	2026	5	3
Total		7	5

Scores and results list Dominican Republic's goal tally first, score column indicates score after each Mariano goal.

List of international goals scored by Mariano Díaz
No.	Date	Venue	Opponent	Score	Result	Competition
1	24 March 2013	Estadio Panamericano, San Cristóbal, Dominican Republic	Haiti	3–0	3–1	Friendly
2	25 March 2025	Estadio Cibao FC, Santiago de los Caballeros, Dominican Republic	Puerto Rico	1–0	2–0	Friendly
3	3 June 2026	Estadio Rommel Fernández, Ciudad de Panama, Panama	Panama	1–2	2–4	Friendly
4	24 September 2026	Estadio Cibao FC, Santiago de los Caballeros, Dominican Republic	Nicaragua	2–0	3–2	2026–27 CONCACAF Nations League A
5	27 September 2026	Hasely Crawford Stadium, Port of Spain, Trinidad and Tobago	Trinidad and Tobago	2–1	2–1	2026–27 CONCACAF Nations League A

== Honours ==
Real Madrid

- La Liga: 2016–17, 2019–20, 2021–22
- Copa del Rey: 2022–23
- Supercopa de España: 2020
- UEFA Champions League: 2016–17, 2021–22
- UEFA Super Cup: 2022
- FIFA Club World Cup: 2016, 2022

Individual

- Segunda División B top scorer: 2015–16
