= Sivera =

Sivera is a surname. Notable people with the surname include:

- Antoni Sivera (born 1978), Andorran football midfielder
- Antonio Sivera (born 1996), Spanish football goalkeeper
