= Adrián Rodríguez (footballer, born 2000) =

Argentine footballer (born 2000)

Personal information
- Full name: Adrián Rodríguez Giménez
- Date of birth: 12 December 2000 (age 25)
- Place of birth: Palma, Spain
- Height: 1.95 m (6 ft 5 in)
- Position: Goalkeeper

Team information
- Current team: Alavés

Youth career
- 2006–2011: La Salle
- 2011–2015: Mallorca
- 2015–2019: Real Madrid

Senior career*
Years	Team	Apps	(Gls)
2019–2020	Real Madrid B	0	(0)
2019–2020	→ Albacete B (loan)	23	(0)
2020–2024	Alavés B	74	(0)
2024–	Alavés	2	(0)
2025–2026	→ Zaragoza (loan)	15	(0)

International career
2019	Argentina U20	2	(0)
- * Club domestic league appearances and goals as of 31 May 2026

Adrián Rodríguez Giménez (born 12 December 2000) is a professional footballer who plays as a goalkeeper for Spanish club Deportivo Alavés. Born in Spain, he represents Argentina internationally.

== Club career ==
Born in Palma de Mallorca, Balearic Islands, Rodríguez joined Real Madrid's La Fábrica in August 2015, after representing RCD Mallorca and SD La Salle. In July 2019, after finishing his formation, he was loaned out to Albacete Balompié, being a third-choice goalkeeper in the main squad while assigned to the reserves.

In August 2020, Rodríguez signed for Deportivo Alavés, being initially a member of the B-team. A backup option to Aritz Castro and Jesús Owono in the first two years, he subsequently became a starter, and renewed his contract until 2027 on 9 January 2024.

In February 2024, however, Rodríguez suffered a knee injury, being sidelined for two months. In August, he was definitely promoted to the main squad in La Liga, as a third-choice behind Antonio Sivera and Owono.

Rodríguez made his professional – and top tier – debut on 8 March 2025, coming on as a second-half substitute for outfield player Pau Cabanes in a 1–0 home win over Villarreal CF, as Sivera was sent off. On 11 August, he was loaned to Segunda División side Real Zaragoza for one year.

== International career ==
Eligible to represent Argentina or Spain, Rodríguez received a call-up to the former's under-20 team in October 2018. He received another call-up to the side the following March, before being called up to the full side in October 2019 for trainings.

== Career statistics ==
As of match played 31 May 2026

Appearances and goals by club, season and competition
Club	Season	League			National Cup		Other		Total	
Club	Season	Division	Apps	Goals	Apps	Goals	Apps	Goals	Apps	Goals
Albacete B	2019–20	Tercera División	23	0	—		—		23	0
Albacete	2019–20	Segunda División	0	0	—		—		0	0
Alavés B	2020–21	Segunda División B	7	0	—		—		7	0
Alavés B	2021–22	Tercera División RFEF	16	0	—		—		16	0
Alavés B	2022–23	Segunda Federación	32	0	—		4	0	36	0
Alavés B	2023–24	Segunda Federación	19	0	—		—		19	0
Alavés B	Total		74	0	—		4	0	78	0
Alavés	2021–22	La Liga	0	0	0	0	—		0	0
Alavés	2022–23	Segunda División	0	0	0	0	0	0	0	0
Alavés	2023–24	La Liga	0	0	0	0	—		0	0
Alavés	2024–25	La Liga	2	0	0	0	—		2	0
Alavés	2026–27	La Liga	0	0	0	0	—		0	0
Alavés	Total		2	0	0	0	0	0	2	0
Zaragoza (loan)	2025–26	Segunda División	15	0	1	0	—		16	0
Career total			114	0	1	0	4	0	119	0

== Personal life ==
Rodríguez's father Ernesto was a volleyball player; born in Argentina, he represented Spain at the 2000 Summer Olympics. His younger brother Gabriel is also a footballer; a centre-back, he too was groomed at Mallorca.
