= Xanet Olaiz =

Spanish footballer (born 2005)

Personal information
- Full name: Xanet Olaiz Ibarzabal
- Date of birth: 18 July 2005 (age 21)
- Place of birth: Astigarraga, Spain
- Height: 1.83 m (6 ft 0 in)
- Position: Centre-back

Team information
- Current team: Alavés
- Number: 27

Youth career
- 2019–2023: Alavés

Senior career*
Years	Team	Apps	(Gls)
2023–2024	Alavés C	26	(4)
2024–	Alavés B	58	(1)
2025–	Alavés	1	(0)

International career
2022	Spain U18	1	(0)
2023	Spain U19	1	(0)
- * Club domestic league appearances and goals as of 6 September 2026

Xane Olaiz Ibarzabal (born 18 July 2005) is a Spanish footballer who plays for Deportivo Alavés. Mainly a centre-back, he can also play as a left-back.

== Club career ==
Born in Astigarraga, Gipuzkoa, Basque Country, Olaiz joined Deportivo Alavés' youth sides in 2019, aged 14. In June 2022, while still a youth, he renewed his contract with the club until 2025.

Promoted to the C-team ahead of the 2023–24 Tercera Federación, Olaiz subsequently started to feature with the reserves in Segunda Federación, later establishing himself as a regular starter for the side. He made his first team debut on 2 December 2025, coming on as a late substitute for Yusi in a 3–0 away win over Club Portugalete, for the season's Copa del Rey.

On 19 April 2026, Olaiz further extended his link with the Babazorros until 2028. He made his professional – and La Liga – debut on 6 September, replacing Jonny Otto late into a 5–2 home win over CA Osasuna.

== International career ==
Olaiz represented Spain at under-18 and under-19 levels.
