= David Vicente =

Spanish footballer

Personal information
- Full name: David Vicente Robles
- Date of birth: 23 April 1999 (age 27)
- Place of birth: Zaragoza, Spain
- Height: 1.72 m (5 ft 8 in)
- Position: Right back

Team information
- Current team: Heracles Almelo
- Number: 15

Youth career
- 2013–2017: Stadium Casablanca
- 2017–2018: Zaragoza

Senior career*
Years	Team	Apps	(Gls)
2017	Zaragoza	0	(0)
2018–2020	Zaragoza B	66	(3)
2020–2022	Las Palmas B	57	(1)
2022–2023	Unionistas	17	(0)
2023–2024	Mirandés	18	(0)
2024–2026	Murcia	68	(0)
2026–	Heracles Almelo	9	(1)
- * Club domestic league appearances and goals as of 2 October 2026

David Vicente Robles (born 23 April 1999) is a Spanish footballer who plays for Eerste Divisie club Heracles Almelo in the Netherlands. Mainly a right back, he can also play as a winger.

== Club career ==
Born in Zaragoza, Vicente joined Real Zaragoza's youth setup in 2017, from Stadium Casablanca. On 4 October of that year, he extended his contract with the club.

On 30 November 2017, before even appearing for the reserves, Vicente made his first team debut by starting in a 4-1 away loss against Valencia CF, for the season's Copa del Rey. He would resume his spell at the club with the B's mainly in Tercera División, however.

On 5 October 2020, Vicente signed for another reserve team, UD Las Palmas Atlético in Segunda División B. In June 2022, he was definitely promoted to the main squad in Segunda División, but terminated his contract on 11 August, and moved to Primera División RFEF side Unionistas de Salamanca CF just hours later.

An undisputed starter for Unionistas, Vicente returned to the second level on 23 January 2023, after agreeing to an 18-month deal with CD Mirandés. His debut in the category occurred six days later, as he played the last 15 minutes of a 3–1 home loss to Deportivo Alavés.

In July 2024, Vicente joined Real Murcia.

On 7 July 2026, Vicente signed a two-year contract with Heracles Almelo.

== Personal life ==
Vicente's twin brother Carlos is also a footballer. A forward, he also represented Zaragoza.
