= Ibrahim Diabate =

Ivorian footballer

Personal information
- Full name: Ibrahim Yalatif Diabate
- Date of birth: 17 November 1999 (age 26)
- Place of birth: Bouaké, Ivory Coast
- Height: 1.85 m (6 ft 1 in)
- Position: Forward

Team information
- Current team: Erzurumspor (on loan from GAIS)
- Number: 19

Youth career
- Académie MimoSifcom

Senior career*
Years	Team	Apps	(Gls)
2016–2018	ASEC Mimosas		
2016–2017	→ Ivoire Académie (loan)		
2018–2023	Mallorca B	118	(49)
2019–2020	→ Sevilla B (loan)	22	(4)
2021–2023	Mallorca	1	(0)
2021	→ Atlético Madrid B (loan)	8	(0)
2023–2024	Västerås SK	36	(4)
2025–	GAIS	29	(18)
2026	→ Alavés (loan)	10	(2)
2026–	→ Erzurumspor (loan)	5	(0)
- * Club domestic league appearances and goals as of 10 October 2026

Ibrahim Yalatif Diabate (born 17 November 1999) is an Ivorian professional footballer who plays as a forward for Süper Lig club Erzurumspor in Turkey on loan from Allsvenskan club GAIS. He speaks Spanish and French.

== Club career ==
=== ASEC Mimosas ===
Born in Bouaké, Diabate was promoted to ASEC Mimosas' first team in September 2017, after a loan period at Ligue 2 side Ivoire Académie.

=== Mallorca ===
In August 2018, after 11 appearances in all competitions, he signed for RCD Mallorca and was initially assigned to the reserves in Tercera División.

On 2 September 2019, after scoring 16 goals as his side missed out promotion in the play-offs, Diabate was loaned to Sevilla Atlético for one year, with a buyout clause. Upon returning in July 2020, he was assigned back to Mallorca B.

Diabate made his first team debut for the Bermellones on 6 January 2021, coming on as a second-half substitute for Álex Alegría in a 2–2 away draw against CF Fuenlabrada, as his side was knocked out on penalties, for the season's Copa del Rey. His Segunda División debut occurred four days later, as he replaced Dani Rodríguez in a 0–1 home loss against UD Las Palmas.

On 1 February 2021, Diabate moved to Atlético Madrid B in the third division on loan for the remainder of the campaign.

=== Västerås SK ===
On 11 July 2023, Diabete completed a move to Västerås SK in Sweden's second division Superettan on a one-and-a-half-year contract. VSK won promotion to Allsvenskan 2024, and Diabate played 20 games for the club in the top flight, but only managed to score one goal as VSK were relegated.

=== GAIS ===
After his contract expired at Västerås, he signed a three-year agreement with the Gothenburg club GAIS.

In a match against Mjällby on 6 April 2025, Diabate scored his first goal for GAIS in the Allsvenskan. It came in the 90th minute and rescued a point for his team in a match that finished 1-1.

Diabate won Allsvenskan Player of the Month for July 2025. He scored four of the team's nine goals that month, which included a brace in their home win against then top team, Hammarby.

Diabate won the Golden Boot (SV: skytteligan) for the most goals in Allsvenskan 2025 with 18 goals. The team finished in third place in the table and qualified for the UEFA Conference League.

==== Loan to Alavés ====
On 2 February 2026, Diabate returned to Spain after joining La Liga side Deportivo Alavés on loan until June. On 13 May, he scored the winner in a 1–0 home success over FC Barcelona.

== International career ==
In June 2023, he took part in the Maurice Revello Tournament in France with Ivory Coast.

== Honours ==
Individual

- Allsvenskan top scorer: 2025 (shared with August Priske)
