= Carlos Vicente (footballer) =

Spanish footballer (born 1999)

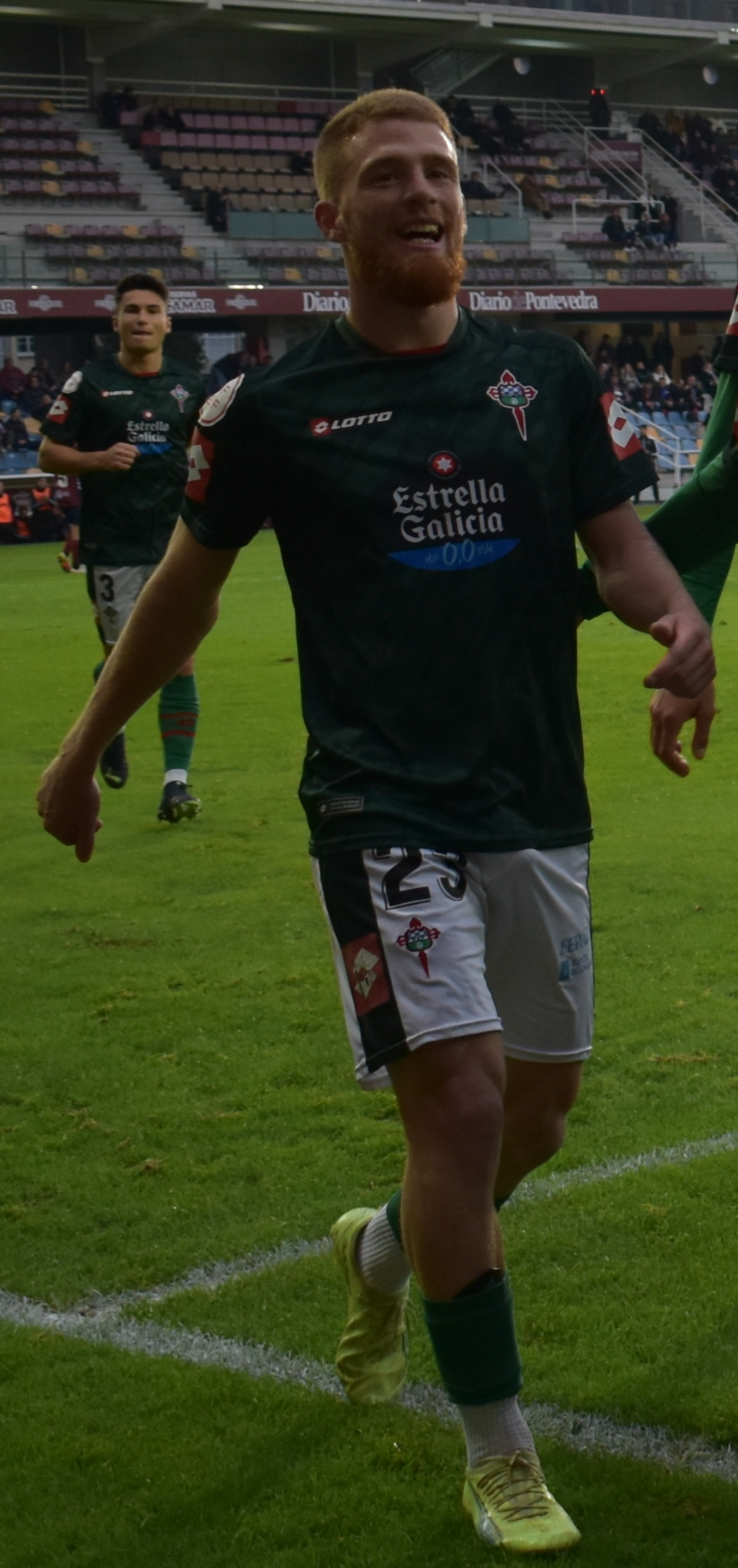
- Vicente with Racing Ferrol in 2022

Personal information
- Full name: Carlos Vicente Robles
- Date of birth: 23 April 1999 (age 27)
- Place of birth: Zaragoza, Spain
- Height: 1.79 m (5 ft 10 in)
- Position: Winger

Team information
- Current team: Birmingham City
- Number: 7

Youth career
- 2013–2017: Stadium Casablanca
- 2017–2018: Zaragoza

Senior career*
Years	Team	Apps	(Gls)
2017–2020	Zaragoza B	65	(14)
2020	Pobla Mafumet	1	(0)
2021	Ejea	18	(4)
2021–2022	Calahorra	37	(11)
2022–2023	Racing Ferrol	59	(12)
2024–2026	Alavés	76	(12)
2026–	Birmingham City	29	(5)
- * Club domestic league appearances and goals as of 24 October 2026 (UTC)

Carlos Vicente Robles (born 23 April 1999) is a Spanish footballer who plays as a winger for EFL Championship club Birmingham City.

== Club career ==
=== Early career ===
Born in Zaragoza, Aragon, Vicente joined Real Zaragoza's youth setup in 2017, from Stadium Casablanca. He made his senior debut with the reserves on 24 September of that year, coming on as a second-half substitute in a 5–2 Segunda División B away loss against Badalona.

Vicente scored his first senior goal on 2 September 2018, netting the B's fourth in a 4–0 Tercera División home routing of Calamocha, and finished the 2018–19 season with ten goals as Deportivo Aragón missed out promotion in the play-offs. On 5 October 2020, he signed a one-year deal with Gimnàstic de Tarragona, and was initially assigned to the farm team in the fourth tier.

Vicente left Nàstic on 6 November 2020, after just one match for Pobla, and joined Ejea in the third level on 30 December. On 24 June 2021, he moved to Primera División RFEF side Calahorra.

=== Racing Ferrol ===
On 30 June 2022, after scoring a career-best 11 goals for the Riojan side, Vicente signed for Racing Ferrol in the same division. He featured in all matches during the regular season, scoring eight times as the club achieved promotion to Segunda División after 15 years.

Vicente made his professional debut on 12 August 2023, starting in a 1–0 away win over Elche. He scored his first professional goal on 10 September, netting the equalizer through the penalty spot in a 2–2 home draw against Villarreal B.

=== Alavés ===
On 22 December 2023, Vicente joined La Liga side Alavés for a reported fee of 600.000 euros, signing a three-and-a-half-year contract with the club. He made his debut in the category the following 2 January, replacing Antonio Blanco in a 1–1 away draw against Real Sociedad.

=== Birmingham City ===
On 27 January 2026, Vicente joined EFL Championship club Birmingham City on a three-and-a-half-year contract for an undisclosed fee. He made his league debut four days later against Oxford United coming on as a 60th-minute substitute for Patrick Roberts and provided the assist for Marvin Ducksch's 66th-minute goal to secure a 2–0 win.

== Personal life ==
Vicente's twin brother David is also a footballer. A right back, he also represented Zaragoza.

== Career statistics ==
As of match played 12 April 2026

Appearances and goals by club, season and competition
Club	Season	League			National cup (Note: Includes Copa del Rey, FA Cup)		League cup (Note: Includes EFL Cup)		Other		Total	
Club	Season	Division	Apps	Goals	Apps	Goals	Apps	Goals	Apps	Goals	Apps	Goals
Calahorra	2021–22	Primera División RFEF	37	11	1	0	—		—		38	11
Racing Ferrol	2022–23	Primera Federación	38	8	1	0	—		2 (Note: Appearances in Primera Federación champions play-off)	0	41	2
Racing Ferrol	2023–24	Segunda División	21	4	2	0	—		—		23	4
Racing Ferrol	Total		59	12	3	0	—		2	0	64	12
Alavés	2023–24	La Liga	18	2	1	0	—		—		19	2
Alavés	2024–25	La Liga	37	5	1	0	—		—		38	5
Alavés	2025–26	La Liga	21	5	4	5	—		—		25	10
Alavés	Total		76	12	6	5	—		—		82	17
Birmingham City	2025–26	Championship	13	3	1	0	0	0	—		14	3
Career total			185	38	11	5	0	0	2	0	198	43
