= Mikel Rodríguez =

Spanish footballer (born 2002)

Personal information
- Full name: Mikel Rodríguez Ulacia
- Date of birth: 3 April 2002 (age 24)
- Place of birth: Getaria, Spain
- Height: 1.75 m (5 ft 9 in)
- Position: Midfielder

Team information
- Current team: Alavés
- Number: 18

Youth career
- Antiguoko
- 2020–2021: Real Sociedad

Senior career*
Years	Team	Apps	(Gls)
2021–2023	Real Sociedad C	18	(4)
2021–2022	→ Pasaia (loan)	32	(4)
2023–2026	Real Sociedad B	85	(8)
2026–	Alavés	1	(1)
- * Club domestic league appearances and goals as of 15 August 2026

Mikel Rodríguez Ulacia (born 3 April 2002) is a Spanish footballer who plays as a midfielder for La Liga club Deportivo Alavés.

== Career ==
Born in Getaria, Gipuzkoa, Basque Country, Rodríguez joined Real Sociedad's youth sides in 2020, from Antiguoko. In 2021, after finishing his formation, he was loaned to Tercera División RFEF side Pasaia KE, for one year.

Back to the Txuri-urdin in July 2022, Rodríguez was assigned to the C-team in Segunda Federación, and was promoted to the reserves in the following year. On 24 January 2024, he renewed his contract until 2025.

Rodríguez became a first-choice for Sanse during the 2024–25 season, and further extended his link until 2027 on 22 January 2025. He scored a career-best seven goals in 36 appearances overall during the campaign, as the club achieved promotion to Segunda División.

Rodríguez made his professional debut on 17 August 2025, starting in a 1–0 home win over Real Zaragoza. He scored his first goal in the second level on 21 September, but in a 2–1 loss at SD Eibar.

On 16 July 2026, Rodríguez signed a five-year contract with La Liga side Deportivo Alavés. He made his top tier debut on 15 August, replacing Denis Suárez and scoring his team's third in a 3–0 home win over Getafe CF.
