= Aitor Mañas =

Spanish footballer

Personal information
- Full name: Aitor Mañas Buenadicha
- Date of birth: 5 January 2003 (age 23)
- Place of birth: Madrid, Spain
- Height: 1.81 m (5 ft 11 in)
- Position: Forward

Team information
- Current team: Alavés
- Number: 20

Youth career
- 2007–2008: Azpi
- 2008–2009: La Meca
- 2009–2012: Rivamar
- 2012–2015: Rayo Vallecano
- 2015–2022: Real Madrid
- 2022: → Celta (loan)

Senior career*
Years	Team	Apps	(Gls)
2022–2023	RSC Internacional	28	(9)
2023–2025	Zaragoza B	62	(20)
2024–2025	Zaragoza	0	(0)
2025–2026	Alavés B	19	(7)
2025–	Alavés	9	(0)
- * Club domestic league appearances and goals as of 15 August 2026

Aitor Mañas Buenadicha (born 5 January 2003) is a Spanish footballer who plays as a forward for Deportivo Alavés.

== Career ==
Born in Madrid, Mañas joined Real Madrid's youth sides in 2015, after representing Rayo Vallecano, Rivamar FC, AD La Meca de Rivas and Azpi Rivas FC. On 19 December 2021, after being rarely used in the Juvenil side, he was loaned to RC Celta de Vigo until the following June.

Upon returning to Los Blancos, Mañas was assigned to farm team RSC Internacional FC in Tercera Federación, and made his senior debut on 17 September 2022, starting in a 1–0 away loss to CDE Ursaria. He renewed his contract with the club on 6 October, and scored his first senior goal ten days later, netting Inter's second in a 2–0 away win over Las Rozas CF.

On 19 July 2023, Mañas joined Real Zaragoza and was assigned to the reserves in Segunda Federación. He made his first team debut on 3 December of the following year, coming on as a late substitute for Alberto Marí in a 2–2 home draw against Granada CF, for the season's Copa del Rey; he was the club's fifth taker in the shoot-out, missing his shot as Zaragoza were knocked out 5–4.

On 9 July 2025, Mañas signed a three-year deal with another reserve team, Deportivo Alavés B also in the fourth division. After appearing with the first team in two Copa del Rey matches, he made his La Liga debut on 20 December, replacing Pablo Ibáñez in a 3–0 away loss to CA Osasuna.

On 26 June 2026, Mañas renewed his contract with the Babazorros until 2030.
