= Moussa Diarra (footballer, born 2000) =

Malian footballer (born 2000)

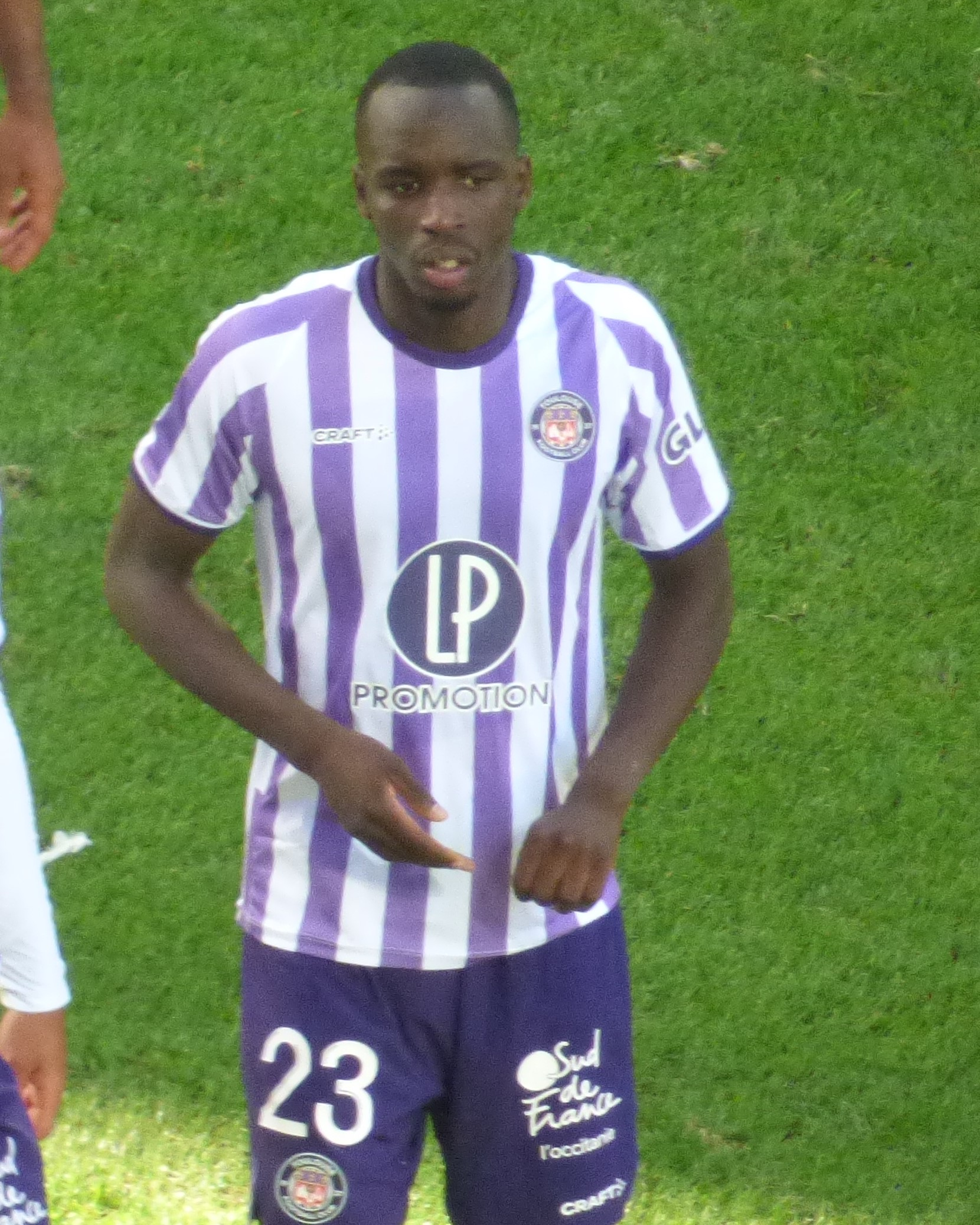
- Diarra playing for Toulouse in 2023

Personal information
- Date of birth: 10 November 2000 (age 26)
- Place of birth: Stains, France
- Height: 1.85 m (6 ft 1 in)
- Position: Defender

Team information
- Current team: Al Wahda

Youth career
- 2016–2018: Toulouse

Senior career*
Years	Team	Apps	(Gls)
2018–2022	Toulouse II	29	(0)
2019–2024	Toulouse	88	(1)
2024–2026	Alavés	29	(0)
2026	→ Anderlecht (loan)	12	(0)
2026–	Al Wahda	0	(0)

International career^{‡}
2023–	Mali	5	(0)
- * Club domestic league appearances and goals as of 17 May 2026 ‡ National team caps and goals as of 18:12, 24 March 2025 (UTC)

Moussa Diarra (born 10 November 2000) is a professional footballer who plays for UAE Pro League club Al Wahda. Mainly a centre-back, he can also play as a left-back. Born in France, Diarra plays for the Mali national team.

== Club career ==
=== Toulouse ===
On 21 April 2019, Diarra signed his first professional contract with Toulouse. He made his professional debut with Toulouse in a 2–1 Coupe de la Ligue win over Chamois Niortais on 30 October 2019.

On 14 May 2023, Diarra refused to participate in a Ligue 1 match against Nantes due to the game being part of a league-wide campaign against homophobia. He scored his first professional goal on 13 April 2024, in a 2–1 away win over Rennes.

=== Alavés ===
On 18 July 2024, Diarra joined La Liga side Deportivo Alavés on a four-year deal.

=== Al Wahda ===
In August 2026, Diarra left Alavés to join Emirati club Al Wahda, signing a three-year contract. The move brought an end to his two-year spell with the Spanish club, for whom he made 32 official appearances.

== International career ==
Born in France, Diarra is Malian by descent. He was called up to the Mali national team for a set of friendlies in September 2022.

On 2 January 2024, he was selected from the list of 27 Malian players called up by Éric Chelle for the 2023 Africa Cup of Nations.

== Career statistics ==
=== Club ===
As of match played 17 May 2026

Appearances and goals by club, season and competition
Club	Season	League			National cup		League cup		Europe		Other		Total	
Club	Season	Division	Apps	Goals	Apps	Goals	Apps	Goals	Apps	Goals	Apps	Goals	Apps	Goals
Toulouse B	2018–19	National 3	15	0	—		—		—		—		15	0
Toulouse B	2019–20	National 3	13	0	—		—		—		—		13	0
Toulouse B	2021–22	National 3	1	0	—		—		—		—		1	0
Toulouse B	Total		29	0	—		—		—		—		29	0
Toulouse	2019–20	Ligue 1	1	0	0	0	2	0	—		—		3	0
Toulouse	2020–21	Ligue 2	17	0	3	0	—		—		0	0	20	0
Toulouse	2021–22	Ligue 2	25	0	0	0	—		—		—		25	0
Toulouse	2022–23	Ligue 1	23	0	2	0	—		—		—		25	0
Toulouse	2023–24	Ligue 1	22	1	0	0	—		7 (Note: Appearances in UEFA Europa League)	0	1 (Note: Appearance in Trophée des Champions)	0	30	1
Toulouse	Total		88	1	5	0	2	0	7	0	1	0	103	1
Alavés	2024–25	La Liga	26	0	1	0	—		—		—		27	0
Alavés	2025–26	La Liga	3	0	2	0	—		—		—		5	0
Alavés	Total		29	0	3	0	—		—		—		32	0
Anderlecht (loan)	2025–26	Belgian Pro League	12	0	3	0	—		—		15	0		
Career total			158	1	11	0	2	0	7	0	1	0	179	1

=== International ===
As of match played 24 March 2025

Appearances and goals by national team and year
National team	Year	Apps	Goals
Mali	2023	2	0
Mali	2024	1	0
Mali	2025	2	0
Total		5	0

== Honours ==
Toulouse

- Ligue 2: 2021–22
- Coupe de France: 2022–23
