= Toni Martínez =

Spanish footballer (born 1997)

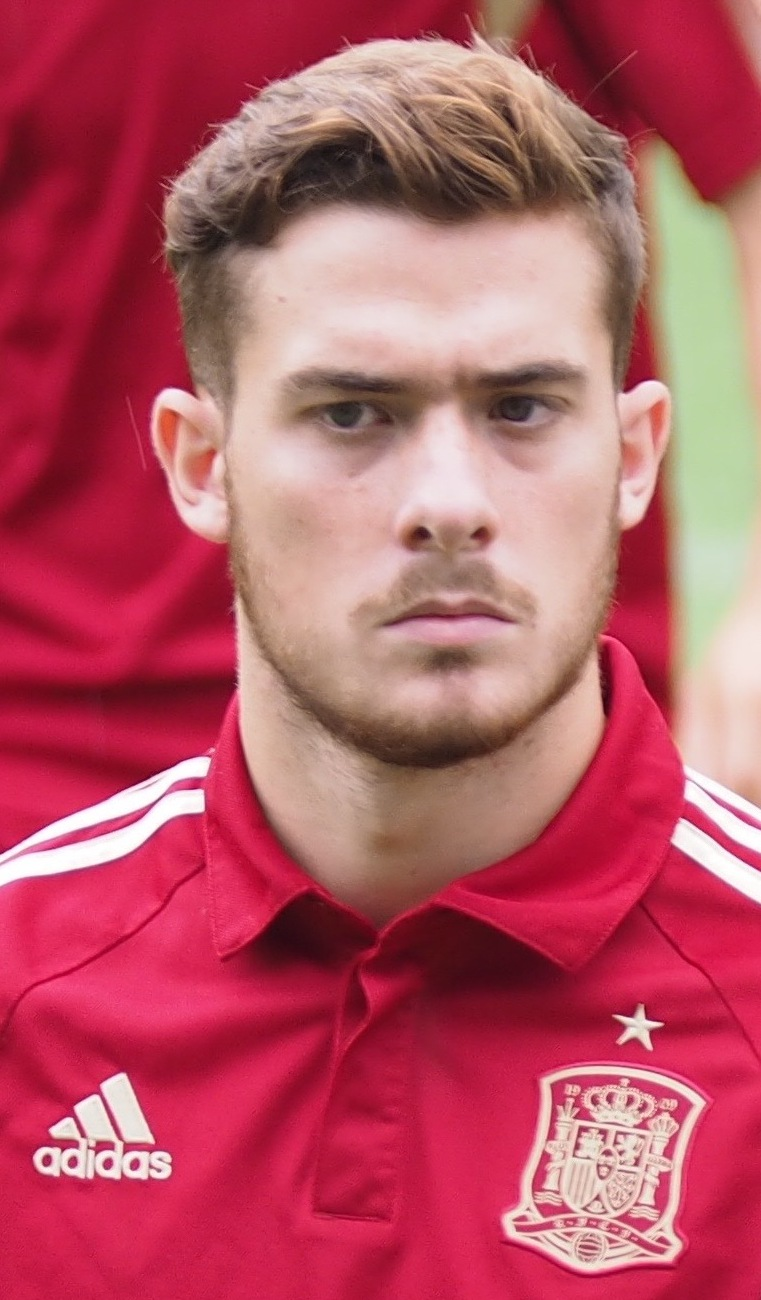
- Martínez at the 2015 SBS Cup

Personal information
- Full name: Antonio Martínez López
- Date of birth: 30 June 1997 (age 29)
- Place of birth: Barrio del Progreso, Spain
- Height: 1.87 m (6 ft 2 in)
- Position: Forward

Team information
- Current team: Alavés
- Number: 11

Youth career
- El Progreso
- 2012–2013: Murcia
- 2013–2016: Valencia

Senior career*
Years	Team	Apps	(Gls)
2013–2016	Valencia B	16	(2)
2016–2019	West Ham United	0	(0)
2017	→ Oxford United (loan)	15	(1)
2018	→ Valladolid (loan)	10	(1)
2018–2019	→ Rayo Majadahonda (loan)	15	(2)
2019	→ Lugo (loan)	13	(1)
2019–2020	Famalicão	33	(10)
2020–2024	Porto	89	(19)
2021	Porto B	1	(1)
2024–	Alavés	65	(18)

International career
2014	Spain U17	4	(0)
2015	Spain U18	2	(0)
2016	Spain U19	2	(0)
- * Club domestic league appearances and goals as of 23 May 2026 (UTC)

Antonio "Toni" Martínez López (Spanish pronunciation: [anˈtonjo ˈtoni maɾˈtineθ ˈlopeθ]; born 30 June 1997) is a Spanish professional footballer who plays as a forward for La Liga club Deportivo Alavés. He has represented Spain internationally at youth level.

Martínez began his senior career at Valencia Mestalla, before joining West Ham United in 2016. He was loaned to several English and Spanish clubs, then signed for Famalicão in 2019. The following year, he joined Porto.

== Club career ==
=== Valencia ===
Born in Barrio del Progreso, Murcia, Martínez began his footballing career with local side C.F.S. El Progreso and later joined Real Murcia. In 2013, he signed for Valencia. Initially a member of the club's academy Cadete A team (for players aged 14–15 years), Martínez was soon admitted to their reserve side, Valencia Mestalla (Valencia B). He made his senior debut in the Segunda División B (third tier) at the age of 16, coming on as a substitute and scoring in a match against AE Prat on 8 December 2013.

In three seasons at Valencia Mestalla he played 16 games and scored two goals, and made a further eight appearances, a goal and three assists for the club's under-19 squad in the UEFA Youth League.

=== West Ham United ===
==== 2016–17: Signing and Oxford loan ====
In April 2016, Martínez agreed a three-year deal to join English club West Ham United on 1 July 2016 for a fee of around £2.4 million. He was given permission to train with his new teammates by Valencia to help him settle in England and would initially link up with West Ham United's development squad. Martínez was given the number 29 shirt for the 2016–17 season.

He marked his Premier League 2 debut with a goal against Stoke City, in a 3–0 home win. After scoring seven goals in as many games for West Ham United U23 during the first half of the season, he suffered two injury set-backs; the first left him sidelined for six weeks with the player due to return to action on 21 November, but then suffered another injury. His prolific goal-scoring feats continued into January and before long he had racked up a total of 12 goals from 11 games.

On 23 January 2017, he was sent out on loan for the first time in his career, to League One side Oxford United until the end of the 2016–17 season. The player was handed the number 7 shirt by the club. On 28 January, Martínez came on as a substitute to score his first goal for the U's in a 3–0 home win over Newcastle United in the fourth round of the FA Cup. He made his league debut on 5 February in an away fixture against local rivals Swindon Town, a game which Oxford won 2–1, and scored his first league goal, a late consolation goal in a 3–2 home defeat at the hands of league leaders Sheffield United, on 7 March.

==== 2017–18: Debut and Valladolid loan ====
On 7 January 2018, Martínez made his full West Ham debut in an FA Cup third round tie at Shrewsbury Town, replacing Javier Hernández after 71 minutes in a 0–0 draw. On 1 February, he made a deadline day loan switch to Segunda División club Real Valladolid for the remainder of the 2017–18 season. He contributed with one goal in ten appearances, as his side achieved promotion to La Liga in the play-offs.

==== 2018–19: Rayo Majadahonda and Lugo loans ====
On 13 August 2018, Martínez joined CF Rayo Majadahonda still in Spain's second division, on loan for the season. He made his debut six days later on the opening weekend of the season against Real Zaragoza, Majadahonda's first game at this level. On as a second-half substitute for Enzo Fernández, he scored the club's first goal in the Segunda División, albeit in a 2–1 defeat.

On 18 January 2019, Martínez rescinded his loan deal with Majadahonda and moved to CD Lugo of the same league, on loan until June. On his debut eight days later, he scored the opener in a 3–2 home win against his former club.

He was released by West Ham on 1 July 2019, when his contract expired.

=== Famalicão ===
On 22 July 2019, Martínez joined F.C. Famalicão on a three-year contract. He made his debut on 3 August in the first round of the Taça da Liga, as a 59th-minute substitute for Pedro Gonçalves in a 2–0 home loss to S.C. Covilhã. A week later, in his team's first Primeira Liga match for a quarter of a century, he scored the first goal of the season in a 2–0 win at C.D. Santa Clara.

Martínez scored four goals in five games as Famalicão reached the semi-finals of the Taça de Portugal for the first time since 1946. All came in consecutive games, including one in each leg of a 4–3 aggregate elimination by S.L. Benfica in February 2020.

=== Porto ===
On 4 October 2020, Martínez joined Porto on a five-year contract. He won his first silverware on 23 December in the 2020 Supertaça Cândido de Oliveira, as a last-minute substitute in a 2–0 win over O Clássico rivals S.L. Benfica.

Martínez scored his first Porto goal on 21 November in a 2–0 cup win at G.D. Fabril, opening the score with a bicycle kick; his first league goal was in a 3–0 home win over Moreirense F.C. on 3 January 2021. On 14 February, he dropped into the reserve team in Liga Portugal 2 for a 2–1 loss to visitors U.D. Oliveirense, in which he scored after five minutes.

On 15 August 2021, Martínez scored both of Porto's goals in a 2–1 win on his return to Famalicão. He was sent off on 11 September in a 1–1 draw at Sporting CP for a foul on Sebastián Coates. On 17 February 2022, Martínez scored both goals of a 2–1 home win over S.S. Lazio in the UEFA Europa League last 32; he played more often in the continental tournament as manager Sérgio Conceição prioritised other players for the league.

=== Alavés ===
On 27 August 2024, Martínez returned to his home country after signing a four-year contract with Deportivo Alavés in the top tier. A day later, he scored a goal on his La Liga debut in a 2–1 away win over Real Sociedad.

In the 2025–26 season, he achieved his personal best goalscoring record with 13 goals in La Liga, including the winner in a 1–0 away victory over Real Oviedo on the penultimate matchday, which secured his club's survival in the top flight. He concluded the season with 14 goals, finishing two goals short of winning the Zarra Trophy.

== International career ==
Martínez played four matches for Spain U17, making his debut on 22 January 2014 against Italy.

In 2015, he received a call from Spain U19 to participate in the 2015 UEFA Under-19 Championship in Greece.

== Career statistics ==
As of match played 23 May 2026

Appearances and goals by club, season and competition
Club	Season	League			National cup (Note: Includes FA Cup, Copa del Rey, Taça de Portugal)		League cup (Note: Includes Taça da Liga)		Continental		Other		Total	
Club	Season	Division	Apps	Goals	Apps	Goals	Apps	Goals	Apps	Goals	Apps	Goals	Apps	Goals
Valencia Mestalla	2013–14	Segunda División B	5	1	—		—		—		—		5	1
Valencia Mestalla	2014–15	Segunda División B	8	1	—		—		—		—		8	1
Valencia Mestalla	2015–16	Segunda División B	3	0	—		—		—		—		3	0
Valencia Mestalla	Total		16	2	—		—		—		—		16	2
West Ham United	2016–17	Premier League	0	0	0	0	0	0	—		—		0	0
West Ham United	2017–18	Premier League	0	0	3	0	0	0	—		—		3	0
West Ham United	Total		0	0	3	0	0	0	—		—		3	0
West Ham United U-23s	2016–17	—			—		—		—		1 (Note: Appearance(s) in EFL Trophy)	2	1	2
West Ham United U-23s	2017–18	—			—		—		—		3	2	3	2
West Ham United U-23s	Total		—		—		—		—		4	4	4	4
Oxford United (loan)	2016–17	League One	15	1	2	2	0	0	—		0	0	17	3
Real Valladolid (loan)	2017–18	Segunda División	10	1	0	0	—		—		1 (Note: Appearance in La Liga play-offs)	0	11	1
Rayo Majadahonda (loan)	2018–19	Segunda División	16	2	2	0	—		—		—		18	2
Lugo (loan)	2018–19	Segunda División	13	1	—		—		—		—		13	1
Famalicão	2019–20	Primeira Liga	32	10	6	4	1	0	—		—		39	14
Famalicão	2020–21	Primeira Liga	1	0	0	0	0	0	—		—		1	0
Famalicão	Total		33	10	6	4	1	0	—		—		40	14
Porto B	2020–21	Liga Portugal 2	1	1	—		—		—		—		1	1
Porto	2020–21	Primeira Liga	18	7	3	1	2	0	3 (Note: Appearance(s) in UEFA Champions League)	0	1 (Note: Appearance in Supertaça Cândido de Oliveira)	0	27	8
Porto	2021–22	Primeira Liga	19	3	6	2	2	0	10 (Note: Six appearances in UEFA Champions League, four appearances and two goals in UEFA Europa League)	2	—		37	7
Porto	2022–23	Primeira Liga	31	5	7	6	4	2	7	0	1	0	50	13
Porto	2023–24	Primeira Liga	20	4	1	0	1	0	2	0	1	0	25	4
Porto	2024–25	Primeira Liga	0	0	0	0	1	0	0	0	0	0	1	0
Porto	Total		88	19	17	9	10	2	22	2	3	0	140	32
Alavés	2024–25	La Liga	28	4	2	0	—		—		—		30	4
Alavés	2025–26	La Liga	37	14	5	4	—		—		—		42	18
Alavés	Total		65	18	7	4	—		—		—		72	22
Career total			257	55	37	19	11	2	22	2	8	4	335	82

== Honours ==
Porto

- Primeira Liga: 2021–22
- Taça de Portugal: 2021–22, 2022–23, 2023–24
- Taça da Liga: 2022–23
- Supertaça Cândido de Oliveira: 2020, 2022, 2024

Individual

- Primeira Liga's Forward of the Month: August 2021
