= Unai Ropero =

Spanish footballer (born 2005)

Personal information
- Full name: Unai Ropero Pérez
- Date of birth: 20 November 2001 (age 24)
- Place of birth: Vitoria-Gasteiz, Spain
- Height: 1.87 m (6 ft 2 in)
- Position: Winger

Team information
- Current team: Racing Ferrol (on loan from Alavés)

Youth career
- Ariznabarra
- 2018–2019: Aurrerá de Vitoria
- 2019–2020: Alavés

Senior career*
Years	Team	Apps	(Gls)
2020–2024	Alavés B	94	(30)
2020–2021	San Ignacio	24	(7)
2022–	Alavés	2	(0)
2024–2025	→ Eldense (loan)	15	(1)
2025–2026	→ Hércules (loan)	33	(6)
2026–	→ Racing Ferrol (loan)	0	(0)
- * Club domestic league appearances and goals as of 10 June 2026

Unai Ropero Pérez (born 20 November 2001) is a Spanish professional footballer who plays as a winger for Racing de Ferrol, on loan from Deportivo Alavés.

== Club career ==
Ropero is a youth product of the Basque clubs CD Ariznabarra and CD Aurrerá de Vitoria, before moving to Deportivo Alavés' academy in 2019. He began his senior career with the reserves in 2020, and after one appearance he spent the rest of the 2020–21 season with farm team Club San Ignacio in the Tercera Federación.

Ropero returned to Alavés in July 2021, and was part of their senior squad in the pre-season. On 21 March 2022, he signed a professional contract with the club for two seasons. He made his senior and professional debut with Alavés as a substitute in a 1–0 loss to Cádiz CF on 22 May 2022.

On 26 June 2024, Ropero was loaned to Segunda División side CD Eldense for the 2024–25 campaign. Roughly one year later, after suffering relegation, he moved to Hércules CF in Primera Federación also in a temporary one-year deal.

On 8 July 2026, Ropero moved to fellow third division side Racing de Ferrol on a one-year deal, still owned by Alavés.
