= Selu Diallo =

Guinean footballer (born 2003)

Personal information
- Full name: Mamadou Selu Diallo
- Birth name: Mamadou Selu Diallo Diallo (Note: In this Spanish name, the first or paternal surname is Diallo and the second or maternal family name is Diallo.)
- Date of birth: 1 October 2003 (age 23)
- Place of birth: Huesca, Spain
- Height: 1.87 m (6 ft 2 in)
- Position: Midfielder

Team information
- Current team: Alavés

Youth career
- 2011–2021: IPC La Escuela

Senior career*
Years	Team	Apps	(Gls)
2021	Barbastro	1	(0)
2021–2022	San Ignacio	36	(1)
2022–2024	Alavés B	58	(6)
2023–	Alavés	0	(0)
2024–2025	→ Atlético Madrid B (loan)	29	(0)
2025–2026	→ Cultural Leonesa (loan)	34	(0)

International career
2024–	Guinea U23	1	(0)
- * Club domestic league appearances and goals as of 31 May 2026

Mamadou Selu Diallo (born 1 October 2003) is a professional footballer who plays as a midfielder for Spanish club Deportivo Alavés. Born in Spain, he represents Guinea internationally.

== Club career ==
Born in Huesca, Aragon, Diallo was an IPC La Escuela youth graduate. In 2021, he made his senior debut with Tercera División side UD Barbastro before joining Deportivo Alavés; he was initially assigned to farm team Club San Ignacio in Tercera División RFEF.

Ahead of the 2022–23 season, Diallo was promoted to the reserves in Segunda Federación. On 23 July 2023, he extended his contract with the club until 2028.

Diallo made his first team debut with the Babazorros on 2 November 2023, starting in a 10–0 away routing of Deportivo Murcia FC, for the campaign's Copa del Rey. He made his professional debut the following 16 January, coming on as a second-half substitute for Antonio Blanco in a 2–0 loss at Athletic Bilbao, also for the national cup.

On 17 July 2024, Diallo was loaned to Primera Federación side Atlético Madrid B for the season. On 3 August of the following year, he moved to Cultural y Deportiva Leonesa in Segunda División also in a temporary one-year deal.

== International career ==
On 7 March 2024, Diallo was called up by the Guinea national under-23 team. He made his debut against the United States on 22 March.

== Personal life ==
Born in Spain, Diallo is of Guinean descent.
