= Antonio Sivera =

Spanish footballer (born 1996)

Personal information
- Full name: Antonio Sivera Salvá
- Date of birth: 11 August 1996 (age 30)
- Place of birth: Xàbia, Spain
- Height: 1.84 m (6 ft 0 in)
- Position: Goalkeeper

Team information
- Current team: Alavés
- Number: 1

Youth career
- Jávea
- 2009–2011: Alicante
- 2011–2013: Hércules
- 2013–2015: Valencia

Senior career*
Years	Team	Apps	(Gls)
2013–2017	Valencia B	44	(0)
2017–	Alavés	167	(0)
2020	→ Almería (loan)	4	(0)

International career
2014–2015	Spain U19	11	(0)
2017–2019	Spain U21	10	(0)
- * Club domestic league appearances and goals as of 23:20, 29 October 2026 (UTC)

Antonio Sivera Salvá (born 11 August 1996) is a Spanish professional footballer who plays as a goalkeeper for La Liga club Deportivo Alavés, who he captains.

== Club career ==
=== Valencia ===
Born in Xàbia, Alicante, Valencian Community, Sivera joined Valencia CF's youth setup in 2013 following stints at CD Jávea, Alicante CF and Hércules CF. He made his senior debut on 10 November 2013 at the age of 17, starting for the reserves in a 3–1 Segunda División B away loss against Elche CF Ilicitano.

Sivera signed a five-year professional contract with Valencia on 10 February 2015, and was definitely promoted to the B team in May. After spending the 2015–16 season as a backup to Álex Sánchez, he became a regular starter in the following as they reached the promotion play-offs finals.

=== Alavés ===
On 19 July 2017, Sivera joined La Liga club Deportivo Alavés on a four-year deal. He made his professional debut on 24 October, in a 1–0 away win over Getafe CF in the fourth round of the Copa del Rey.

Sivera's first match in the league took place on 29 April 2018, when he started and was replaced by habitual starter Fernando Pacheco at the hour mark of the 0–1 home loss to Atlético Madrid. On 13 January 2020, he moved to Segunda División side UD Almería on loan until the end of the season.

Upon returning, Sivera was again a backup to Pacheco, and only became first choice in 2022 after the latter left. He played all league matches in 2025–26, and in August 2026 renewed his contract until 2030.

== International career ==
Sivera won his first cap for Spain at under-21 level on 1 September 2017, in a 3–0 friendly defeat of Italy held in Toledo. In 2019, he was the starter as the team won the UEFA European Championship for the fifth time.

== Career statistics ==
As of match played 23 October 2026

Appearances and goals by club, season and competition
Club	Season	League			National Cup		Other		Total	
Club	Season	Division	Apps	Goals	Apps	Goals	Apps	Goals	Apps	Goals
Valencia B	2013–14	Segunda División B	2	0	—		—		2	0
Valencia B	2014–15	Segunda División B	1	0	—		—		1	0
Valencia B	2015–16	Segunda División B	9	0	—		—		9	0
Valencia B	2016–17	Segunda División B	32	0	—		6 (Note: Appearances in Segunda División B play-offs)	0	38	0
Valencia B	Total		44	0	—		6	0	50	0
Alavés	2017–18	La Liga	1	0	6	0	—		7	0
Alavés	2018–19	La Liga	3	0	2	0	—		5	0
Alavés	2019–20	La Liga	3	0	1	0	—		4	0
Alavés	2020–21	La Liga	1	0	3	0	—		4	0
Alavés	2021–22	La Liga	4	0	2	0	—		6	0
Alavés	2022–23	Segunda División	41	0	0	0	4 (Note: Appearances in La Liga play-offs)	0	45	0
Alavés	2023–24	La Liga	34	0	1	0	—		35	0
Alavés	2024–25	La Liga	32	0	1	0	—		33	0
Alavés	2025–26	La Liga	38	0	0	0	—		38	0
Alavés	2026–27	La Liga	10	0	0	0	—		10	0
Alavés	Total		167	0	16	0	4	0	187	0
Almería (loan)	2019–20	Segunda División	4	0	0	0	2	0	6	0
Career total			215	0	16	0	12	0	243	0

== Honours ==
Spain U19

- UEFA European Under-19 Championship: 2015

Spain U21

- UEFA European Under-21 Championship: 2019
