= Abde Rebbach =

Algerian footballer (born 1998)

Abde
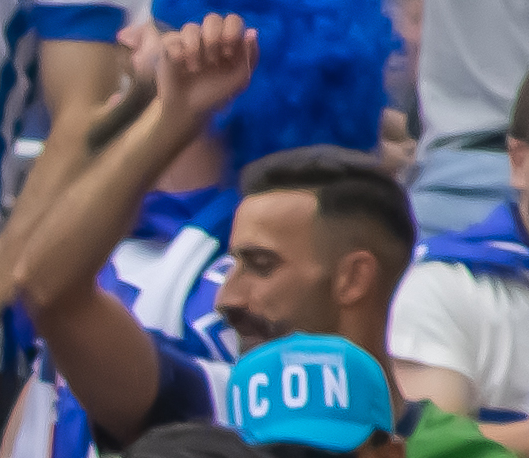
- Abde in 2023

Personal information
- Full name: Abderrahman Rebbach
- Date of birth: 11 August 1998 (age 28)
- Place of birth: Blida, Algeria
- Height: 1.76 m (5 ft 9 in)
- Position: Left winger

Team information
- Current team: Alavés
- Number: 21

Youth career
- Iru-Bat
- Ariznabarra
- Aurrerá Vitoria

Senior career*
Years	Team	Apps	(Gls)
2017–2018	Aurrerá Vitoria	29	(10)
2018–2020	San Ignacio	53	(14)
2020–2022	Alavés B	50	(19)
2022–	Alavés	80	(4)
2025	→ Granada (loan)	19	(3)

International career^{‡}
2026–	Algeria	1	(0)
- * Club domestic league appearances and goals as of 27 May 2026 ‡ National team caps and goals as of 17 November 2026

Abderrahman Rebbach (born 11 August 1998), commonly known as Abde, is an Algerian professional footballer who plays as a left winger for La Liga club Alavés and the Algeria national team.

== Club career ==
Born in Blida, Abde moved to Vitoria-Gasteiz, Álava, Basque Country at the age of 12. He played for SD Iru-Bat Santa Lucía, CD Ariznabarra and CD Aurrerá de Vitoria as a youth, and made his senior debut with the latter during the 2017–18 season, in Tercera División.

In 2018, Abde joined Deportivo Alavés' affiliate side Club San Ignacio, also in the fourth tier. On 18 August 2020, he was assigned to the reserves in Segunda División B.

On 25 May 2022, after scoring 16 goals for the B-side in the previous campaign, Abde signed a two-year contract and was definitely promoted to the first team in Segunda División. He made his professional debut on 13 August, coming on as a second-half substitute for Xeber Alkain in a 2–1 away win over CD Leganés.

Abde scored his first professional goal on 3 September 2022, netting the opener in a 1–1 home draw against UD Las Palmas. He scored a further two goals during the season, featuring in 25 matches overall as the club achieved promotion to La Liga.

Abde made his top tier debut on 14 August 2023, playing the last 23 minutes in a 1–0 away loss to Cádiz CF. His first goal in the category came on 24 November, as he scored his side's second in a 3–1 home win over Granada CF.

On 16 January 2025, Abde moved to Granada on loan with an option to buy.

== International career ==
Rebbach made his debut for the Algeria national team on 17 November 2026 in an AFCON qualifier against Togo.
