= Ángel Pérez (footballer, born 2002) =

Spanish footballer

Personal information
- Full name: Ángel Pérez Hidalgo
- Date of birth: 29 August 2002 (age 24)
- Place of birth: Zaragoza, Spain
- Height: 1.83 m (6 ft 0 in)
- Positions: Right-back; winger

Team information
- Current team: Alavés
- Number: 7

Youth career
- Zaragoza
- Montecarlo

Senior career*
Years	Team	Apps	(Gls)
2021–2022	Cuarte	28	(2)
2022–2025	Huesca B	29	(4)
2023–2024	→ Utebo (loan)	34	(2)
2024–2025	→ Racing B (loan)	32	(10)
2025–2026	Huesca	18	(1)
2026–	Alavés	16	(1)
- * Club domestic league appearances and goals as of 17 May 2026

Ángel Pérez Hidalgo (born 29 August 2002) is a Spanish footballer who plays as either a right-back or a right winger for Deportivo Alavés.

== Career ==
Born in Zaragoza, Aragon, Pérez played for Real Zaragoza and UD Montecarlo as a youth. In 2021, he signed for Tercera División RFEF side CD Cuarte, making his senior debut on 5 September of that year, in a 0–0 away draw against Atlético Monzón.

On 29 July 2022, Pérez moved to SD Huesca and was initially assigned to the reserves also in the fifth tier. On 5 July of the following year, he was loaned to Segunda Federación side Utebo FC for the season.

On 29 August 2024, Pérez was announced at Racing de Santander's B-team on a one-year loan deal. Playing as a wing-back, he scored 10 goals for the side during the season.

Back to Huesca in June 2025, Pérez renewed his contract until 2027 and was promoted to the first team in Segunda División. He made his professional debut on 13 September, starting in a 1–0 home win over Málaga CF, and scored his first professional goal on 12 December, netting the opener in a 2–0 success at Cultural y Deportiva Leonesa.

On 28 January 2026, La Liga side Deportivo Alavés announced the signing of Pérez on a four-and-a-half-year contract, after they triggered his € 1 million release clause.
