= Adrián Pica =

Spanish footballer

Personal information
- Full name: Adrián Hernández Hernández
- Date of birth: 25 April 2002 (age 24)
- Place of birth: Alba de Tormes, Spain
- Height: 1.90 m (6 ft 3 in)
- Position: Centre-back

Team information
- Current team: Penafiel (on loan from Alavés)

Youth career
- Salamanca
- 2019–2020: Alba de Tormes
- 2020–2021: Guijuelo

Senior career*
Years	Team	Apps	(Gls)
2021–2022	Guijuelo	22	(1)
2022–2023	Mirandés B	26	(1)
2023–2024	Guijuelo	32	(1)
2024	Alavés B	3	(0)
2024–	Alavés	9	(0)
2025–2026	→ Mirandés (loan)	8	(1)
2026–	→ Penafiel (loan)	0	(0)
- * Club domestic league appearances and goals as of 9 June 2026

Adrián Hernández Hernández (born 25 April 2002), known as Adrián Pica or just Pica, is a Spanish professional footballer who plays as a centre-back for Portuguese club FC Penafiel, on loan from Deportivo Alavés.

== Career ==
Born in Alba de Tormes, Salamanca, Castile and León, Pica represented Salamanca CF UDS, CD Alba de Tormes CF and CD Guijuelo as a youth. He made his senior debut with the latter on 21 March 2021, coming on as a late substitute for Miguel Fernández in a 1–0 Segunda División B away loss to Racing de Ferrol.

On 10 August 2022, Pica moved to CD Mirandés and was assigned to the reserves in Tercera Federación. The following 12 July, he returned to the Chacineros, now in Segunda Federación, and was a regular starter during the campaign as the club missed out promotion in the play-offs.

On 17 July 2024, Pica signed for Deportivo Alavés and was initially assigned to the B-team also in the fourth division. After spending the pre-season with the main squad, he made his professional – and La Liga – debut on 28 August, starting in a 2–1 away win over Real Sociedad.

On 1 July 2025, Pica renewed his contract with the Babazorros until 2028, and immediately returned to Mirandés on a one-year loan deal. He scored his first professional goal the following 2 January, but in a 2–1 loss at SD Eibar.

On 14 July 2026, after being rarely used, Pica moved abroad after agreeing to a one-year loan deal with Liga Portugal 2 side FC Penafiel.
