= Nahuel Tenaglia =

Argentine footballer

Personal information
- Full name: Facundo Nahuel Tenaglia
- Date of birth: 21 February 1996 (age 30)
- Place of birth: Saladillo, Argentina
- Height: 1.81 m (5 ft 11 in)
- Position: Right-back

Team information
- Current team: Alavés
- Number: 14

Youth career
- Argentino de Saladillo
- Boca Juniors
- Deportivo La Lola
- Huracán de Saladillo
- 2014–2016: Atlanta

Senior career*
Years	Team	Apps	(Gls)
2016–2017	Atlanta	19	(0)
2017–2023	Talleres	84	(8)
2022–2023	→ Alavés (loan)	48	(3)
2023–	Alavés	95	(5)
- * Club domestic league appearances and goals as of 27 May 2026

Facundo Nahuel Tenaglia (born 21 February 1996) is an Argentine professional footballer who plays for Spanish club Deportivo Alavés. Mainly a right-back, he can also play as a centre-back.

== Career ==
Tenaglia began his youth career with Argentino de Saladillo, prior to becoming a member of the Boca Juniors system and then having subsequent spells with Deportivo La Lola and Huracán de Saladillo. In 2014, Tenaglia joined Atlanta. Two years later, in October 2016, he made his senior career debut during a Primera B Metropolitana fixture with San Telmo. He made nineteen league appearances in 2016–17 as Atlanta reached the promotion play-offs before losing in round one to Deportivo Español. This was Tenaglia's final game for the club, and he was sent off in the 89th minute. On 23 August 2017, Talleres completed the signing of Tenaglia.

Tenaglia made his debut for Talleres on 10 December 2017, in a 2–0 victory away to Colón in the Argentine Primera División. He scored his first goal on 29 September 2019, netting his team's first in a 3–2 away loss against Independiente.

On 12 January 2022, Tenaglia was loaned to La Liga side Deportivo Alavés for 18 months. On 20 August 2023, after helping the club in their return to the top tier, he signed a permanent four-year contract.

== Career statistics ==
As of 21 May 2018

Appearances and goals by club, season and competition
Club	Season	League			National cup (Note: Includes the Copa Argentina)		League cup		Continental		Other		Total	
Club	Season	Division	Apps	Goals	Apps	Goals	Apps	Goals	Apps	Goals	Apps	Goals	Apps	Goals
Atlanta	2016–17	Primera B Metropolitana	19	0	0	0	—		—		1 (Note: One appearance in 2016–17 Primera B Metropolitana play-offs)	0	20	0
Talleres	2017–18	Primera División	5	0	0	0	—		—		0	0	5	0
Career total			24	0	0	0	—		—		1	0	25	0
