= Yusi (footballer) =

Moroccan footballer (born 2005)

Youssef Enríquez
Personal information
- Full name: Youssef Enríquez Lekhedim
- Date of birth: 7 October 2005 (age 21)
- Place of birth: Madrid, Spain
- Height: 1.70 m (5 ft 7 in)
- Position: Left-back

Team information
- Current team: Alavés
- Number: 3

Youth career
- 2012–2013: San Fernando Henares
- 2013–2015: Rayo Vallecano
- 2015–2016: Moratalaz
- 2016–2017: Getafe
- 2017–2024: Real Madrid

Senior career*
| Years | Team | Apps | (Gls) |
| 2023–2024 | Real Madrid C | 0 | (0) |
| 2024–2025 | Real Madrid B | 35 | (1) |
| 2024–2025 | Real Madrid | 0 | (0) |
| 2025– | Alavés | 25 | (0) |

International career^{‡}
| 2019–2020 | Spain U15 | 6 | (0) |
| 2021–2022 | Spain U17 | 12 | (0) |
| 2023 | Spain U18 | 3 | (0) |
| 2023 | Morocco U20 | 5 | (0) |
| 2026– | Morocco U23 | 1 | (0) |
- * Club domestic league appearances and goals as of 27 May 2026 ‡ National team caps and goals as of 18 December 2023

Youssef Enríquez Lekhedim (Arabic: يوسف انريكيز للخادم; born 7 October 2005), also known as Yusi, is a professional footballer who plays as a left-back for La Liga club Alavés. Born in Spain, he represents the Morocco national team.

== Club career ==
Born in Madrid to a Spanish father and a Moroccan mother, Enríquez started his career with San Fernando Henares, before joining Rayo Vallecano in 2013. After a two-year stint at Rayo Vallecano, Enríquez joined ED Moratalaz for one year, before going to Getafe in 2016. In 2017, Enríquez joined Real Madrid youth division.

=== Real Madrid ===
In 2017, Enríquez joined the academy of Real Madrid, firstly joining their Under-14 B team. He appeared for the Under-19 team in the UEFA Youth League in the 2023–24 season.

On 30 November 2023, Enríquez signed a new contract with Real Madrid until 2028. In July of the following year, he was officially promoted to Real Madrid Castilla from the youth system, joining the reserve team of Real Madrid.

During the 2024–25 season, Enríquez featured 14 times as an unused substitute for Real Madrid's first team.

=== Alavés ===
On 16 July 2025, Enríquez signed a four-year contract with La Liga side Deportivo Alavés.

== International career ==
Eligible to represent both Spain and Morocco, Enríquez played for the Spain's under-15 until under-18 side, before switching his national allegiance to the Moroccan national team. In 2023, he has represented the Moroccan under-20 team.

In March 2024, Enríquez was called up by Walid Regragui and was included in the Moroccan national team final squad, for the friendlies against Angola and Mauritania as an unused substitute.

== Career statistics ==
=== Club ===
As of match played 24 May 2025

Appearances and goals by club, season and competition
| Club | Season | League | | | Other | | Total | |
| Club | Season | Division | Apps | Goals | Apps | Goals | Apps | Goals |
|---|---|---|---|---|---|---|---|---|
| Real Madrid C | 2023–24 | Tercera Federación | 0 | 0 | 0 | 0 | 0 | 0 |
| Real Madrid Castilla | 2024–25 | Primera Federación | 35 | 1 | 0 | 0 | 35 | 1 |
| Career total | | | 35 | 1 | 0 | 0 | 35 | 1 |

== Honours ==
Real Madrid U19

- División de Honor Juvenil: 2022–23
- Copa del Rey Juvenil: 2022–23
- Copa de Campeones de División de Honor Juvenil: 2023

Real Madrid

- FIFA Intercontinental Cup: 2024
