= Club San Ignacio =

Football club in Vitoria-Gasteiz, Spain

Coordinates: 42.8329185°N 2.6638429°W

San Ignacio
- Full name: Club San Ignacio
- Founded: 1964
- Ground: Adurtzabal, Vitoria-Gasteiz, Basque Country, Spain
- Capacity: 400
- President: Patxi Tobías
- Head coach: Raúl Llona
- League: Tercera Federación – Group 4
- 2025–26: Tercera Federación – Group 4, 7th of 18
- Website: www.clubsanignacio.com
Home colours	Away colours

Club San Ignacio is a football team based in Vitoria-Gasteiz in the autonomous community of the Basque Country. Founded in 1964, the team plays in Tercera Federación – Group 4. Representing the district of Adurtza, the club's home ground is Adurtzabal, which has a capacity of 400 spectators.

San Ignacio has been closely linked to Deportivo Alavés at various times; it was the formative club of Spain international forward Ernesto Valverde.

== History ==
The origin of the club traces back to a school in Adurtza, the San Ignacio Public School, from where the club was born in 1964, hence the nickname they receive from the Colegiales (Schoolboys). CF San Ignacio was promoted to the Tercera División RFEF (the then 4th tier of Spanish football) for the first time in 1997, after becoming champions of the Álava Preferential Regional (6th tier of Spanish football), but they only lasted a single season. In 2002, San Ignacio achieved promotion to the Tercera División RFEF again, but once again they weren't able to hold on for more than a season, being relegated at the end of the 2002-03 campaign.

In 2003, San Ignacio (who had previously been associated with Real Sociedad) agreed a four-year partnership with Deportivo Alavés to host their second reserve team in Tercera División. The affiliate became known as Alavés C-San Ignacio, maintaining the Alavés name but playing in San Ignacio colours and usually hosting fixtures at their home ground. When this entity was relegated in 2004–05, the Alavés link was discontinued.

San Ignacio continued operating independently and returned to the Tercera level twice (on each occasion their opponents included Deportivo Alavés B, the other reserve side of Alavés, with both teams being relegated in 2008–09). The club remains a partner club of Alavés. They were promoted again in 2017–18, with Alavés offering use of their Ibaia facilities for matches at that level due to the Federation being concerned with the condition of the playing surface at Adurtzabal. Further progression to the Segunda División B (never achieved by the club) was a possibility in 2018–19 until defeat in the playoffs.

Between 2019 and 2022, San Ignacio's squad was fully composed of Alavés players, acting mainly as a second reserve team behind Alavés B. In 2022, with Alavés C being reactivated, the link between Alavés and San Ignacio returned to a collaboration agreement.

== Stadium ==
Until the 2017–18 season, San Ignacio played on the Estadio Adurtzabal, with artificial grass. In the summer of 2018, due to the impossibility of playing the matches in Adurtzabal, Club San Ignacio went on to play their matches at the Ibaia facilities, owned by Deportivo Alavés.

== Season to season ==
Season	Tier	Division	Place	Copa del Rey
1971–72	5	2ª Reg.	6th	
1972–73	5	2ª Reg.	4th	
1973–74	5	2ª Reg.	5th	
1974–75	5	1ª Reg.	8th	
1975–76	5	1ª Reg.	6th	
1976–77	5	1ª Reg.	17th	
1977–78	6	1ª Reg.	16th	
1978–79	6	1ª Reg.	15th	
1979–80	6	1ª Reg.	10th	
1980–81	6	1ª Reg.	2nd	
1981–82	6	1ª Reg.	2nd	
1982–83	6	1ª Reg.	2nd	
1983–84	6	1ª Reg.	2nd	
1984–85	6	1ª Reg.	1st	
1985–86	5	Reg. Pref.	20th	
1986–87	6	1ª Reg.	1st	
1987–88	5	Reg. Pref.	3rd	
1988–89	5	Reg. Pref.	3rd	
1989–90	5	Reg. Pref.	2nd	
1990–91	5	Reg. Pref.	8th	

Season	Tier	Division	Place	Copa del Rey
1991–92	5	Reg. Pref.	10th	
1992–93	5	Reg. Pref.	11th	
1993–94	5	Reg. Pref.	4th	
1994–95	5	Reg. Pref.	3rd	
1995–96	5	Reg. Pref.	3rd	
1996–97	5	Reg. Pref.	1st	
1997–98	4	3ª	19th	
1998–99	5	Reg. Pref.	10th	
1999–2000	5	Reg. Pref.	4th	
2000–01	5	Reg. Pref.	2nd	
2001–02	5	Reg. Pref.	1st	
2002–03	4	3ª	19th	
2003–04 (Note: See also:Deportivo Alavés C)	5	Reg. Pref.	13th	
2004–05	5	Reg. Pref.	4th	
2005–06	5	Reg. Pref.	1st	
2006–07	4	3ª	20th	
2007–08	5	Reg. Pref.	1st	
2008–09	4	3ª	20th	
2009–10	5	Reg. Pref.	3rd	
2010–11	5	Reg. Pref.	5th	

Season	Tier	Division	Place	Copa del Rey
2011–12	5	Reg. Pref.	5th	
2012–13	5	Reg. Pref.	3rd	
2013–14	5	Reg. Pref.	12th	
2014–15	5	Reg. Pref.	6th	
2015–16	5	Reg. Pref.	7th	
2016–17	5	Reg. Pref.	6th	
2017–18	5	Reg. Pref.	1st	
2018–19	4	3ª	4th	
2019–20	4	3ª	7th	
2020–21	4	3ª	6th / 5th	
2021–22	5	3ª RFEF	7th	
2022–23	5	3ª Fed.	15th	
2023–24	5	3ª Fed.	8th	
2024–25	5	3ª Fed.	12th	
2025–26	5	3ª Fed.	7th	
2026–27	5	3ª Fed.		

- 7 seasons in Tercera División
- 6 season in Tercera Federación/Tercera División RFEF

== Notable players ==
- (Equatorial Guinea) Jesús Owono
- (Spain) Ernesto Valverde
- (Spain) Asier Salcedo

== CF San Ignacio B ==
For the 2011–12 season, the collegiate club launched a subsidiary in the First Regional of Álava (7th tier of Spanish football) to release the youth players who finished that stage.
