= 2020 UEFA European Under-19 Championship qualification =

Tournament details
- Dates: Qualifying round: 8 October – 19 November 2019; Elite round: Cancelled
- Teams: 53 (from 1 confederation)

Tournament statistics
- Matches played: 78
- Goals scored: 306 (3.92 per match)
- Top scorer(s): (Switzerland) Lorent Tolaj (8 goals)

The 2020 UEFA European Under-19 Championship qualifying competition was a men's under-19 football competition that was originally to determine the seven teams joining the automatically qualified hosts Northern Ireland in the 2020 UEFA European Under-19 Championship final tournament, before being cancelled due to the COVID-19 pandemic.

Apart from Northern Ireland, 53 of the remaining 54 UEFA member national teams entered the qualifying competition. Players born on or after 1 January 2001 were eligible to participate.

== Format ==
The qualifying competition was planned to consist of two rounds:

- Qualifying round: Apart from Portugal, which received a bye to the elite round as the team with the highest seeding coefficient, the remaining 52 teams were drawn into thirteen groups of four teams. Each group was played in single round-robin format at one of the teams selected as hosts after the draw. The thirteen group winners, the thirteen runners-up, and the third-placed team with the best record against the first and second-placed teams in their group advanced to the elite round.
- Elite round: The 28 teams were drawn into seven groups of four teams. Before being cancelled, each group was planned to be played in single round-robin format at one of the teams selected as hosts after the draw. The seven group winners would have qualified for the final tournament.

The schedule of each group was planned as follows, with two rest days between each matchday (Regulations Article 20.04):

Group schedule
Matchday	Matches
Matchday 1	1 v 4, 3 v 2
Matchday 2	1 v 3, 2 v 4
Matchday 3	2 v 1, 4 v 3

=== Tiebreakers ===
Teams were ranked according to points (3 points for a win, 1 point for a draw, 0 points for a loss), and if tied on points, the following tiebreaking criteria were applied, in the order given, to determine the rankings (Regulations Articles 14.01 and 14.02):

1. Points in head-to-head matches among tied teams;
2. Goal difference in head-to-head matches among tied teams;
3. Goals scored in head-to-head matches among tied teams;
4. If more than two teams were tied, and after applying all head-to-head criteria above, a subset of teams were still tied, all head-to-head criteria above were reapplied exclusively to this subset of teams;
5. Goal difference in all group matches;
6. Goals scored in all group matches;
7. Penalty shoot-out if only two teams had the same number of points, and they met in the last round of the group and were tied after applying all criteria above (not used if more than two teams had the same number of points, or if their rankings were not relevant for qualification for the next stage);
8. Disciplinary points (red card = 3 points, yellow card = 1 point, expulsion for two yellow cards in one match = 3 points);
9. UEFA coefficient ranking for the qualifying round draw;
10. Drawing of lots.

To determine the best third-placed team from the qualifying round, the results against the teams in fourth place were discarded. The following criteria were applied (Regulations Articles 15.01 and 15.02):

1. Points;
2. Goal difference;
3. Goals scored;
4. Disciplinary points (total 3 matches);
5. UEFA coefficient ranking for the qualifying round draw;
6. Drawing of lots.

== Qualifying round ==
=== Draw ===
The draw for the qualifying round was held on 6 December 2018, 10:00 CET (UTC+1), at the UEFA headquarters in Nyon, Switzerland.

The teams were seeded according to their coefficient ranking, calculated based on the following:

- 2015 UEFA European Under-19 Championship final tournament and qualifying competition (qualifying round and elite round)
- 2016 UEFA European Under-19 Championship final tournament and qualifying competition (qualifying round and elite round)
- 2017 UEFA European Under-19 Championship final tournament and qualifying competition (qualifying round and elite round)
- 2018 UEFA European Under-19 Championship final tournament and qualifying competition (qualifying round and elite round)

Each group contained one team from Pot A, one team from Pot B, one team from Pot C, and one team from Pot D. Based on the decisions taken by the UEFA Emergency Panel, the following pairs of teams could not be drawn in the same group: Spain and Gibraltar, Serbia and Kosovo, Bosnia and Herzegovina and Kosovo, Azerbaijan and Armenia.

Final tournament hosts: Team / Coeff. / Rank; Northern Ireland / 4.000 / —	Bye to elite round: Team / Coeff. / Rank; Portugal / 25.222 / 1

Teams entering qualifying round

Pot A
Team	Coeff.	Rank
France	24.000	2
England	23.833	3
Italy	19.611	4
Netherlands	19.000	5
Germany	17.722	6
Ukraine	16.389	7
Austria	16.056	8
Spain	15.833	9
Czech Republic	14.667	10
Greece	13.167	11
Turkey	12.278	12
Russia	12.278	13
Croatia	11.778	14

Pot B
Team	Coeff.	Rank
Slovakia	11.500	15
Sweden	11.278	16
Serbia	10.833	17
Belgium	10.833	18
Norway	10.444	19
Poland	10.167	20
Denmark	9.333	21
Republic of Ireland	9.167	22
Scotland	9.000	23
Georgia	9.000	24
Bulgaria	8.389	25
Bosnia and Herzegovina	8.167	26
Israel	7.667	27

Pot C
Team	Coeff.	Rank
Hungary	7.500	28
Finland	7.333	29
Switzerland	7.000	30
Romania	6.500	31
Montenegro	6.500	32
Slovenia	6.167	33
Cyprus	4.500	34
North Macedonia	4.333	35
Latvia	4.333	36
Azerbaijan	4.000	37
Wales	4.000	38
Belarus	3.667	39
Iceland	3.333	40

Pot D
Team	Coeff.	Rank
Lithuania	3.000	41
Kosovo	2.500	42
Estonia	2.333	43
Moldova	2.000	44
Luxembourg	2.000	45
Albania	2.000	46
Malta	2.000	47
Armenia	1.667	48
Andorra	1.667	49
Kazakhstan	1.333	50
Faroe Islands	1.333	51
Gibraltar	0.333	52
San Marino	0.000	53

Did not enter
Liechtenstein

=== Groups ===
The qualifying round was required to be completed by 19 November 2019.

Times up to 26 October 2019 are CEST (UTC+2), thereafter times are CET (UTC+1), as listed by UEFA (local times, if different, are in parentheses).

==== Group 1 ====
Pos	Team	Pld	W	D	L	GF	GA	GD	Pts	Qualification
1	Turkey (H)	3	3	0	0	8	3	+5	9	Elite round
2	Bulgaria	3	2	0	1	7	3	+4	6	Elite round
3	Montenegro	3	0	1	2	5	8	−3	1	
4	Armenia	3	0	1	2	4	10	−6	1	

Source: UEFA
Rules for classification: Tiebreakers
(H) Hosts
13 November 2019
11:00 (13:00 TRT)

Montenegro	1–3	Bulgaria
Vujanović 14'	Report	Tonev 4'; Nikolov 83' (pen.); Krastev 90+3'

Arslan Zeki Demirci Sports Complex 2, Manavgat
Referee: Balázs Berke (Hungary)
13 November 2019
14:00 (16:00 TRT)

Turkey	4–1	Armenia
Arslantaş 14'; Tunç 16', 64'; Yavuz Kol 69'	Report	Grigoryan 73'

Arslan Zeki Demirci Sports Complex 1, Manavgat
Referee: Jérôme Brisard (France)

16 November 2019
11:00 (13:00 TRT)

Bulgaria	3–0	Armenia
Nikolov 5' (pen.); Todorov 54'; Angelov 67'	Report

Arslan Zeki Demirci Sports Complex 2, Manavgat
Referee: Krzysztof Jakubik (Poland)
16 November 2019
14:00 (16:00 TRT)

Turkey	2–1	Montenegro
Arslantaş 11'; Yavuz Kol 53'	Report	Todorović 6' (pen.)

Arslan Zeki Demirci Sports Complex 1, Manavgat
Referee: Jérôme Brisard (France)

19 November 2019
13:00 (15:00 TRT)

Bulgaria	1–2	Turkey
Krastev 2'	Report	Gündüz 10' (pen.); Karani Ünal 28'

Arslan Zeki Demirci Sports Complex 1, Manavgat
Referee: Krzysztof Jakubik (Poland)
19 November 2019
13:00 (15:00 TRT)

Armenia	3–3	Montenegro
Shaghoyan 49' (pen.), 51'; Tarakchyan 88'	Report	Vukčević 9', 23'; Vukotić 85'

Arslan Zeki Demirci Sports Complex 2, Manavgat
Referee: Balázs Berke (Hungary)

==== Group 2 ====
Pos	Team	Pld	W	D	L	GF	GA	GD	Pts	Qualification
1	Spain	3	3	0	0	7	0	+7	9	Elite round
2	Serbia (H)	3	1	1	1	9	5	+4	4	Elite round
3	Lithuania	3	1	0	2	1	10	−9	3	
4	Romania	3	0	1	2	1	3	−2	1	

Source: UEFA
Rules for classification: Tiebreakers
(H) Hosts
8 October 2019
12:00

Spain	2–0	Lithuania
Gutiérrez 33'; Ramón 57'	Report

King Peter I Stadium, Belgrade
Referee: Glenn Nyberg (Sweden)
8 October 2019
18:00

Romania	1–1	Serbia
Miculescu 48'	Report	Pavlović 31'

Čukarički Stadium, Belgrade
Referee: Antti Munukka (Finland)

11 October 2019
14:00

Spain	1–0	Romania
Sainz 11'	Report

King Peter I Stadium, Belgrade
Referee: Julian Weinberger (Austria)
11 October 2019
14:00

Serbia	8–0	Lithuania
Eraković 6'; Pavlović 19', 29' (pen.), 68'; Dostanić 24', 89'; Zukić 44'; Radmanovac 90+1'	Report

Zemun Stadium, Belgrade
Referee: Glenn Nyberg (Sweden)

14 October 2019
14:00

Serbia	0–4	Spain
	Report	Mollejo 7'; Tenas 21'; Rosanas 53'; Sainz 83'

Sports Center of FA of Serbia, Stara Pazova
Referee: Antti Munukka (Finland)
14 October 2019
14:00

Lithuania	1–0	Romania
Zingertas 54'	Report

Zemun Stadium, Belgrade
Referee: Julian Weinberger (Austria)

==== Group 3 ====
Pos	Team	Pld	W	D	L	GF	GA	GD	Pts	Qualification
1	Scotland (H)	3	2	1	0	5	2	+3	7	Elite round
2	Germany	3	2	0	1	12	3	+9	6	Elite round
3	Belarus	3	1	1	1	6	11	−5	4	
4	Andorra	3	0	0	3	0	7	−7	0	

Source: UEFA
Rules for classification: Tiebreakers
(H) Hosts
9 October 2019
13:00 (12:00 BST)

Germany	3–0	Andorra
Dajaku 16'; Krauß 61'; Samardzic 87'	Report

Firhill Stadium, Glasgow
Referee: Igor Pajač (Croatia)
9 October 2019
20:00 (19:00 BST)

Belarus	2–2	Scotland
Prischepa 34'; Davyskiba 54'	Report	Patterson 12'; Mebude 20' (pen.)

Cappielow Stadium, Greenock
Referee: Fabio Verissimo (Portugal)

12 October 2019
13:00 (12:00 BST)

Germany	9–2	Belarus
Schade 6', 22', 32'; Dajaku 39', 66'; Samardzic 58'; Ehlers 71'; Tauer 83'; Schoenfelder 88'	Report	Kozel 41'; Gurban 75'

Cappielow Stadium, Greenock
Referee: Zbynek Proske (Czech Republic)
12 October 2019
13:00 (12:00 BST)

Scotland	2–0	Andorra
Burroughs 53'; Hamilton 65'	Report

Dumbarton Football Stadium, Dumbarton
Referee: Igor Pajač (Croatia)

15 October 2019
20:05 (19:05 BST)

Scotland	1–0	Germany
McPake 44'	Report

Firhill Stadium, Glasgow
Referee: Fabio Verissimo (Portugal)
15 October 2019
20:05 (19:05 BST)

Andorra	0–2	Belarus
	Report	Pashevich 25'; Lozhkin 90+2'

Dumbarton Football Stadium, Dumbarton
Referee: Zbynek Proske (Czech Republic)

==== Group 4 ====
Pos	Team	Pld	W	D	L	GF	GA	GD	Pts	Qualification
1	Belgium (H)	3	3	0	0	6	1	+5	9	Elite round
2	Iceland	3	2	0	1	9	7	+2	6	Elite round
3	Greece	3	1	0	2	7	7	0	3	
4	Albania	3	0	0	3	4	11	−7	0	

Source: UEFA
Rules for classification: Tiebreakers
(H) Hosts
13 November 2019
14:30

Iceland	0–3	Belgium
	Report	De Ketelaere 19'; Raskin 42'; Colassin 85'

Sportpark Tessenderlo, Tessenderlo
Referee: Vitali Meshkov (Russia)
13 November 2019
19:30

Greece	5–1	Albania
Tzimas 13'; Vagiannidis 59'; Vrakas 72'; Liavas 85'; Athanasakopoulos 88'	Report	Dobra 81'

Luminus Arena Stadium B, Genk
Referee: Kevin Clancy (Scotland)

16 November 2019
19:30

Greece	2–5	Iceland
Sourlis 79'; Tzimas 89'	Report	Kjartansson 19'; Valgeirsson 57'; Ingason 61', 73'; Jóhannesson 66'

Gemeentelijk Sportstadion, Maasmechelen
Referee: Urs Schnyder (Switzerland)
16 November 2019
19:30

Belgium	2–1	Albania
Van Der Brempt 10'; De Ketelaere 45+1'	Report	Broja 76'

Luminus Arena Stadium B, Genk
Referee: Vitali Meshkov (Russia)

19 November 2019
14:30

Belgium	1–0	Greece
Cuypers 90+3'	Report

Gemeentelijk Sportstadion, Maasmechelen
Referee: Kevin Clancy (Scotland)
19 November 2019
14:30

Albania	2–4	Iceland
Cuni 23'; Ndrecka 30'	Report	Barkarson 51'; Þorvaldsson 68'; Guðjohnsen 74'; Gunnarsson 78'

Sportpark Tessenderlo, Tessenderlo
Referee: Urs Schnyder (Switzerland)

==== Group 5 ====
Pos	Team	Pld	W	D	L	GF	GA	GD	Pts	Qualification
1	Wales (H)	3	2	1	0	7	2	+5	7	Elite round
2	Russia	3	1	2	0	7	3	+4	5	Elite round
3	Poland	3	1	0	2	4	8	−4	3	
4	Kosovo	3	0	1	2	2	7	−5	1	

Source: UEFA
Rules for classification: Tiebreakers
(H) Hosts
13 November 2019
14:00 (13:00 GMT)

Russia	1–1	Kosovo
Shkolik 12'	Report	Aliu 11'

Cardiff International Sports Stadium, Cardiff
Referee: Volen Chinkov (Bulgaria)
13 November 2019
14:00 (13:00 GMT)

Wales	3–0	Poland
Adams 23'; Pearson 37'; Patten 53'	Report

Rodney Parade, Newport
Referee: Maurizio Mariani (Italy)

16 November 2019
14:00 (13:00 GMT)

Russia	2–2	Wales
Kosarev 30'; Prokhin 85'	Report	Williams 66' (pen.), 82' (pen.)

Cardiff International Sports Stadium, Cardiff
Referee: Ville Nevalainen (Finland)
16 November 2019
14:00 (13:00 GMT)

Poland	4–1	Kosovo
Nawrocki 40', 42'; Białek 45+2'; Bida 90+3'	Report	Berisha 88'

Dragon Park, Newport
Referee: Volen Chinkov (Bulgaria)

19 November 2019
14:00 (13:00 GMT)

Poland	0–4	Russia
	Report	Kosarev 20'; Vakhaniya 37'; Sevikyan 50'; Shkolik 66'

Cardiff International Sports Stadium, Cardiff
Referee: Maurizio Mariani (Italy)
19 November 2019
14:00 (13:00 GMT)

Kosovo	0–2	Wales
	Report	Pinchard 45+1'; Williams 76'

Rodney Parade, Newport
Referee: Ville Nevalainen (Finland)

==== Group 6 ====
Pos	Team	Pld	W	D	L	GF	GA	GD	Pts	Qualification
1	Italy (H)	3	3	0	0	7	0	+7	9	Elite round
2	Slovakia	3	2	0	1	5	4	+1	6	Elite round
3	Cyprus	3	1	0	2	3	4	−1	3	
4	Malta	3	0	0	3	0	7	−7	0	

Source: UEFA
Rules for classification: Tiebreakers
(H) Hosts
13 November 2019
12:00

Cyprus	1–2	Slovakia
Paroutis 39'	Report	Nebyla 26'; Lichý 60'

Stadio Tullo Morgagni, Forlì
Attendance: 50
Referee: Jens Maae (Denmark)
13 November 2019
15:00

Italy	2–0	Malta
Esposito 43'; Riccardi 65'	Report

Stadio Misano Adriatico Nuovo, Misano Adriatico
Attendance: 510
Referee: Mohammed Al-Hakim (Sweden)

16 November 2019
12:00

Slovakia	3–0	Malta
Lavrinčík 4'; Bašista 25'; Bernát 33'	Report

Stadio Romeo Neri, Rimini
Attendance: 50
Referee: Mohammed Al-Hakim (Sweden)
16 November 2019
15:00

Italy	2–0	Cyprus
Esposito 3' (pen.); Riccardi 78'	Report

Stadio Valentino Mazzola, Santarcangelo di Romagna
Attendance: 755
Referee: Ian McNabb (Northern Ireland)

19 November 2019
15:00

Slovakia	0–3	Italy
	Report	Riccardi 30', 52'; Surovčík 61' (o.g.)

Stadio Giorgio Calbi, Cattolica
Attendance: 750
Referee: Jens Maae (Denmark)
19 November 2019
15:00

Malta	0–2	Cyprus
	Report	Nikolaou 51'; Kakoulli 90+1'

Stadio Valentino Mazzola, Santarcangelo di Romagna
Attendance: 40
Referee: Ian McNabb (Northern Ireland)

==== Group 7 ====
Pos	Team	Pld	W	D	L	GF	GA	GD	Pts	Qualification
1	Czech Republic (H)	3	2	1	0	11	1	+10	7	Elite round
2	Norway	3	2	1	0	10	2	+8	7	Elite round
3	Azerbaijan	3	1	0	2	2	5	−3	3	
4	San Marino	3	0	0	3	1	16	−15	0	

Source: UEFA
Rules for classification: Tiebreakers
(H) Hosts
9 October 2019
15:00

Azerbaijan	0–1	Norway
	Report	Ibragimov 6' (o.g.)

Stadion Stovky, Frýdek-Místek
Referee: Fran Jović (Croatia)
9 October 2019
18:00

Czech Republic	6–0	San Marino
Vít 4', 16'; Firbacher 22'; Szewieczek 53'; Vlček 84'; Zeronik 90+1'	Report

Stadion v Městských sadech, Opava
Referee: Eldorjan Hamiti (Albania)

12 October 2019
15:00

Norway	8–1	San Marino
Ceide 37'; Hansen 42'; Mannsverk 55'; Fofana 56'; Holm 62'; Tagseth 68'; Askildsen 82'; Cornic 90+1'	Report	Fabbri 28'

Stadion Stovky, Frýdek-Místek
Referee: Eldorjan Hamiti (Albania)
12 October 2019
18:00

Czech Republic	4–0	Azerbaijan
Firbacher 4', 68'; Červ 10'; Zeronik 48'	Report

Stadion v Městských sadech, Opava
Referee: Alan Mario Sant (Malta)

15 October 2019
15:00

Norway	1–1	Czech Republic
Holm 60'	Report	Kosař 90+1'

Stadion v Městských sadech, Opava
Referee: Fran Jović (Croatia)
15 October 2019
15:00

San Marino	0–2	Azerbaijan
	Report	Abdullazade 22'; Bayramov 50'

Stadion Stovky, Frýdek-Místek
Referee: Alan Mario Sant (Malta)

==== Group 8 ====
Pos	Team	Pld	W	D	L	GF	GA	GD	Pts	Qualification
1	Denmark (H)	3	2	0	1	4	2	+2	6 (Note: Ranked on head-to-head points: Denmark 3, France 0.)	Elite round
2	France	3	2	0	1	7	1	+6	6	Elite round
3	Finland	3	1	1	1	3	4	−1	4	Elite round
4	Faroe Islands	3	0	1	2	1	8	−7	1	

Source: UEFA
Rules for classification: Tiebreakers
(H) Hosts
Notes:
13 November 2019
14:30

France	5–0	Faroe Islands
Zagre 14'; Truffert 44', 82'; Eneme Ella 63'; Koindredi 85' (pen.)	Report

Køge Stadion, Køge
Referee: Bryn Markham-Jones (Wales)
13 November 2019
19:00

Finland	2–1	Denmark
Sejdijaj 51'; Streng 77'	Report	Winther 87'

Køge Stadion, Køge
Referee: Chris Kavanagh (England)

16 November 2019
13:00

France	2–0	Finland
Begraoui 25', 32' (pen.)	Report

Køge Stadion, Køge
Referee: Juri Frischer (Estonia)
16 November 2019
18:00

Denmark	2–0	Faroe Islands
Ben Slimane 63', 78'	Report

Køge Stadion, Køge
Referee: Bryn Markham-Jones (Wales)

19 November 2019
14:00

Denmark	1–0	France
Isaksen 6'	Report

Køge Stadion, Køge
Referee: Chris Kavanagh (England)
19 November 2019
14:00

Faroe Islands	1–1	Finland
Nurmi 88' (o.g.)	Report	Ablade 34'

Frederiksberg Idrætspark, Frederiksberg
Referee: Juri Frischer (Estonia)

==== Group 9 ====
Pos	Team	Pld	W	D	L	GF	GA	GD	Pts	Qualification
1	Ukraine	3	2	1	0	7	2	+5	7	Elite round
2	Slovenia	3	1	2	0	10	3	+7	5	Elite round
3	Sweden (H)	3	1	1	1	7	4	+3	4	
4	Estonia	3	0	0	3	0	15	−15	0	

Source: UEFA
Rules for classification: Tiebreakers
(H) Hosts
13 November 2019
13:00

Ukraine	4–0	Estonia
Mudryk 38'; Shulianskyi 45'; Sikan 63' (pen.); Hirnyi 77'	Report

Jernvallen, Sandviken
Referee: Lawrence Visser (Belgium)
13 November 2019
18:00

Slovenia	2–2	Sweden
Simič 42'; Burin 54'	Report	Nygren 33'; Lahne 58'

Gavlevallen, Gävle
Referee: José Luis Munuera Montero (Spain)

16 November 2019
13:00

Sweden	4–0	Estonia
Nygren 32', 67'; Suvinõmm 69' (o.g.); Hajal 71'	Report

Jernvallen, Sandviken
Referee: Lawrence Visser (Belgium)
16 November 2019
15:00

Ukraine	1–1	Slovenia
Voloshyn 4'	Report	Urbančič 36'

Gavlevallen, Gävle
Referee: Fedayi San (Switzerland)

19 November 2019
13:00

Sweden	1–2	Ukraine
Lahne 52'	Report	Sikan 6', 43'

Gavlevallen, Gävle
Referee: José Luis Munuera Montero (Spain)
19 November 2019
13:00

Estonia	0–7	Slovenia
	Report	Simič 41', 57'; Maher 45+1'; Cipot 50'; Prelec 69', 81', 86'

Jernvallen, Sandviken
Referee: Fedayi San (Switzerland)

==== Group 10 ====
Pos	Team	Pld	W	D	L	GF	GA	GD	Pts	Qualification
1	Austria (H)	3	3	0	0	18	1	+17	9	Elite round
2	Switzerland	3	2	0	1	19	4	+15	6	Elite round
3	Republic of Ireland	3	1	0	2	14	4	+10	3	
4	Gibraltar	3	0	0	3	1	43	−42	0	

Source: UEFA
Rules for classification: Tiebreakers
(H) Hosts
14 November 2019
13:00

Austria	14–0	Gibraltar
Prass 20' (pen.); Velimirovic 22'; Seidl 24'; Mustapha 37', 43'; Koller 39'; Abdijanovic 51', 72'; Ballo 59'; Monsberger 60', 75', 77', 84'; Adamu 81'	Report

Nevoga-Arena, Straßwalchen
Referee: Timotheos Christofi (Cyprus)
14 November 2019
13:00

Switzerland	2–1	Republic of Ireland
Vonmoos 57'; Tolaj 79'	Report	McEntee 2'

HCS Arena Nonntal, Salzburg
Referee: Kirill Levnikov (Russia)

The Switzerland v Republic of Ireland and Austria v Gibraltar matches, originally scheduled to be played on 13 November 2019 at 11:00 and 14:30 respectively, were postponed to 14 November at 13:00 due to snow.

16 November 2019
13:00

Republic of Ireland	13–0	Gibraltar
Wright 6', 47', 54', 88'; Richards 15'; Omobamidele 23'; Bowden 25', 73'; McGuinness 55'; Tierney 61'; Cannon 62'; Jones 87' (o.g.); Cassidy 90+3'	Report

Nevoga-Arena, Straßwalchen
Referee: Timotheos Christofi (Cyprus)
16 November 2019
17:00

Austria	2–1	Switzerland
Ballo 17'; Adamu 50'	Report	Males 24'

HCS Arena Nonntal, Salzburg
Referee: Filip Glova (Slovakia)

19 November 2019
14:30

Republic of Ireland	0–2	Austria
	Report	Ballo 26'; Adamu 77'

HCS Arena Nonntal, Salzburg
Referee: Kirill Levnikov (Russia)
19 November 2019
14:30

Gibraltar	1–16	Switzerland
Galliano 35' (pen.)	Report	Bunjaku 10', 24', 83'; Tolaj 19', 22', 33', 36', 51', 56', 89'; Mambimbi 45+3' (pen.); Males 48', 77', 85'; Sauter 79'; Sohm 90'

Nevoga-Arena, Straßwalchen
Referee: Filip Glova (Slovakia)

==== Group 11 ====
Pos	Team	Pld	W	D	L	GF	GA	GD	Pts	Qualification
1	England	3	3	0	0	13	1	+12	9	Elite round
2	North Macedonia (H)	3	1	1	1	3	5	−2	4	Elite round
3	Bosnia and Herzegovina	3	1	1	1	2	4	−2	4	
4	Luxembourg	3	0	0	3	0	8	−8	0	

Source: UEFA
Rules for classification: Tiebreakers
(H) Hosts
13 November 2019
13:00

England	4–0	Luxembourg
Harwood-Bellis 7'; Duncan 29', 32'; Amaechi 75'	Report

Gjorče Petrov Stadium, Skopje
Referee: Petri Viljanen (Finland)
13 November 2019
13:00

North Macedonia	0–0	Bosnia and Herzegovina
	Report

Petar Miloševski Training Centre, Skopje
Referee: Donatas Rumšas (Lithuania)

16 November 2019
13:00

England	5–0	North Macedonia
Doyle 41'; Gordon 54'; Garner 72', 79'; Saka 86'	Report

Petar Miloševski Training Centre, Skopje
Referee: Giorgi Kruashvili (Georgia)
16 November 2019
13:00

Bosnia and Herzegovina	1–0	Luxembourg
Bajrović 90+3'	Report

Gjorče Petrov Stadium, Skopje
Referee: Petri Viljanen (Finland)

19 November 2019
13:00

Bosnia and Herzegovina	1–4	England
Đokanović 48'	Report	Anjorin 24'; Laird 38'; Harwood-Bellis 69'; Gordon 70'

Gjorče Petrov Stadium, Skopje
Referee: Donatas Rumšas (Lithuania)
19 November 2019
13:00

Luxembourg	0–3	North Macedonia
	Report	Toshevski 44'; Vosha 45+1'; Murati 80'

Petar Miloševski Training Centre, Skopje
Referee: Giorgi Kruashvili (Georgia)

==== Group 12 ====
Pos	Team	Pld	W	D	L	GF	GA	GD	Pts	Qualification
1	Netherlands	3	3	0	0	15	2	+13	9	Elite round
2	Latvia (H)	3	1	1	1	8	8	0	4	Elite round
3	Israel	3	1	1	1	2	2	0	4	
4	Moldova	3	0	0	3	0	13	−13	0	

Source: UEFA
Rules for classification: Tiebreakers
(H) Hosts
8 October 2019
13:00 (14:00 EEST)

Netherlands	5–0	Moldova
Burger 27'; Van den Berg 33'; Zirkzee 51'; Redan 67', 69'	Report

Zemgale Olympic Center, Jelgava
Attendance: 30
Referee: Rade Obrenovic (Slovenia)
8 October 2019
14:00 (15:00 EEST)

Latvia	0–0	Israel
	Report

Stadions Arkādija, Riga
Attendance: 150
Referee: Ivaylo Stoyanov (Bulgaria)

11 October 2019
13:00 (14:00 EEST)

Israel	2–0	Moldova
Drori 57'; Niddam 90+5' (pen.)	Report

Zemgale Olympic Center, Jelgava
Attendance: 35
Referee: Rade Obrenovic (Slovenia)
11 October 2019
17:00 (18:00 EEST)

Netherlands	8–2	Latvia
Redan 6' (pen.); Summerville 9', 20', 27', 62'; Burger 25'; Azarkan 38', 83'	Report	Zelmanis 12'; Dašķevičs 85'

Stadions Arkādija, Riga
Attendance: 355
Referee: Robert Hennessy (Republic of Ireland)

14 October 2019
13:00 (14:00 EEST)

Israel	0–2	Netherlands
	Report	Azarkan 14'; Burger 54'

Zemgale Olympic Center, Jelgava
Attendance: 60
Referee: Ivaylo Stoyanov (Bulgaria)
14 October 2019
13:00 (14:00 EEST)

Moldova	0–6	Latvia
	Report	Dašķevičs 1'; Lagūns 8'; Viļumsons 26'; Zelmanis 82', 90'; Krollis 86'

Stadions Arkādija, Riga
Attendance: 100
Referee: Robert Hennessy (Republic of Ireland)

==== Group 13 ====
Pos	Team	Pld	W	D	L	GF	GA	GD	Pts	Qualification
1	Georgia	3	3	0	0	9	3	+6	9	Elite round
2	Croatia	3	2	0	1	5	2	+3	6	Elite round
3	Hungary (H)	3	1	0	2	7	6	+1	3	
4	Kazakhstan	3	0	0	3	1	11	−10	0	

Source: UEFA
Rules for classification: Tiebreakers
(H) Hosts
9 October 2019
14:00

Croatia	3–0	Kazakhstan
Brnić 32', 69'; Čuić 36'	Report

Ménfői úti Stadion, Győr
Referee: Horatiu Fesnic (Romania)
9 October 2019
18:00

Hungary	2–4	Georgia
Huszti 27'; Skribek 49' (pen.)	Report	Kvaratskhelia 11'; Guliashvili 62'; Moistsrapishvili 65'; Mekvabishvili 82'

ETO Park, Győr
Referee: Ioannis Papadopoulos (Greece)

12 October 2019
14:00

Georgia	3–1	Kazakhstan
Iakobidze 40', 65'; Davitashvili 42' (pen.)	Report	Zhaksylykov 48'

Ménfői úti Stadion, Győr
Referee: Horatiu Fesnic (Romania)
12 October 2019
20:00

Croatia	2–0	Hungary
Šarić 53'; Vušković 89' (pen.)	Report

ETO Park, Győr
Referee: Thorvaldur Árnason (Iceland)

15 October 2019
20:00

Georgia	2–0	Croatia
Guliashvili 8'; Davitashvili 23' (pen.)	Report

ETO Park, Győr
Referee: Thorvaldur Árnason (Iceland)
15 October 2019
20:00

Kazakhstan	0–5	Hungary
	Report	Nyári 20' (pen.), 44'; Cipf 34', 81'; Tóth-Gábor 52'

Ménfői úti Stadion, Győr
Referee: Ioannis Papadopoulos (Greece)

=== Ranking of third-placed teams ===
To determine the best third-placed team from the qualifying round which advance to the elite round, only the results of the third-placed teams against the first and second-placed teams in their group are taken into account.

Pos	Grp	Team	Pld	W	D	L	GF	GA	GD	Pts	Qualification
1	8	Finland	2	1	0	1	2	3	−1	3	Elite round
2	9	Sweden	2	0	1	1	3	4	−1	1	
3	12	Israel	2	0	1	1	0	2	−2	1	
4	11	Bosnia and Herzegovina	2	0	1	1	1	4	−3	1	
5	3	Belarus	2	0	1	1	4	11	−7	1	
6	1	Montenegro	2	0	0	2	2	5	−3	0	
7	6	Cyprus	2	0	0	2	1	4	−3	0 (Note: Ranked on disciplinary points: Cyprus −8, Republic of Ireland −14.)	
8	10	Republic of Ireland	2	0	0	2	1	4	−3	0	
9	13	Hungary	2	0	0	2	2	6	−4	0 (Note: Ranked on disciplinary points: Hungary −9, Greece −12.)	
10	4	Greece	2	0	0	2	2	6	−4	0	
11	7	Azerbaijan	2	0	0	2	0	5	−5	0	
12	5	Poland	2	0	0	2	0	7	−7	0	
13	2	Lithuania	2	0	0	2	0	10	−10	0	

Source: UEFA
Rules for classification: 1) points; 2) goal difference; 3) goals scored; 4) disciplinary points; 5) coefficient ranking; 6) drawing of lots.

== Elite round ==
=== Draw ===
The draw for the elite round was held on 3 December 2019, 12:00 CET (UTC+1), at the UEFA headquarters in Nyon, Switzerland.

The teams were seeded according to their results in the qualifying round. Portugal, which received a bye to the elite round, were automatically seeded into Pot A. Each group contained one team from Pot A, one team from Pot B, one team from Pot C, and one team from Pot D. Teams from the same qualifying round group could not be drawn in the same group. Based on the decisions taken by the UEFA Emergency Panel, Russia and Ukraine could not be drawn in the same group.

Pos	Grp	Team	Pld	W	D	L	GF	GA	GD	Pts	Seeding
1	—	Portugal	0	0	0	0	0	0	0	0	Pot A
2	10	Austria	3	3	0	0	18	1	+17	9	Pot A
3	12	Netherlands	3	3	0	0	15	2	+13	9	Pot A
4	11	England	3	3	0	0	13	1	+12	9	Pot A
5	6	Italy	3	3	0	0	7	0	+7	9 (Note: Tied on disciplinary points (−4). Ranked on coefficient ranking: Italy 4, Spain 9.)	Pot A
6	2	Spain	3	3	0	0	7	0	+7	9	Pot A
7	13	Georgia	3	3	0	0	9	3	+6	9	Pot A
8	1	Turkey	3	3	0	0	8	3	+5	9	Pot B
9	4	Belgium	3	3	0	0	6	1	+5	9	Pot B
10	7	Czech Republic	3	2	1	0	11	1	+10	7	Pot B
11	7	Norway	3	2	1	0	10	2	+8	7	Pot B
12	9	Ukraine	3	2	1	0	7	2	+5	7 (Note: Tied on disciplinary points (−9). Ranked on coefficient ranking: Ukraine 7, Wales 38.)	Pot B
13	5	Wales	3	2	1	0	7	2	+5	7	Pot B
14	3	Scotland	3	2	1	0	5	2	+3	7	Pot B
15	10	Switzerland	3	2	0	1	19	4	+15	6	Pot C
16	3	Germany	3	2	0	1	12	3	+9	6	Pot C
17	8	France	3	2	0	1	7	1	+6	6	Pot C
18	1	Bulgaria	3	2	0	1	7	3	+4	6	Pot C
19	13	Croatia	3	2	0	1	5	2	+3	6	Pot C
20	4	Iceland	3	2	0	1	9	7	+2	6	Pot C
21	8	Denmark	3	2	0	1	4	2	+2	6	Pot C
22	6	Slovakia	3	2	0	1	5	4	+1	6	Pot D
23	9	Slovenia	3	1	2	0	10	3	+7	5	Pot D
24	5	Russia	3	1	2	0	7	3	+4	5	Pot D
25	2	Serbia	3	1	1	1	9	5	+4	4	Pot D
26	12	Latvia	3	1	1	1	8	8	0	4	Pot D
27	8	Finland	3	1	1	1	3	4	−1	4	Pot D
28	11	North Macedonia	3	1	1	1	3	5	−2	4	Pot D

Source: UEFA
Rules for classification: 1) points; 2) goal difference; 3) goals scored; 4) disciplinary points; 5) coefficient ranking; 6) drawing of lots.

=== Groups ===
The elite round was originally scheduled to be played between 25–31 March 2020. On 12 March 2020, UEFA announced that the elite round had been postponed due to the COVID-19 pandemic. On 17 June 2020, UEFA announced that the elite round had been rescheduled to 2–8 September 2020. However, UEFA announced on 13 August 2020 that after consultation with the 55 member associations, the elite round had been further postponed to October 2020. On 16 September 2020, UEFA announced that the elite round had been further postponed to November 2020. UEFA announced on 20 October 2020 that the tournament had been cancelled.

==== Group 1 ====
Pos	Team	Pld	W	D	L	GF	GA	GD	Pts
1	Austria	0	0	0	0	0	0	0	0
2	Wales (H)	0	0	0	0	0	0	0	0
3	Germany	0	0	0	0	0	0	0	0
4	Serbia	0	0	0	0	0	0	0	0

Source: UEFA
Rules for classification: Tiebreakers
(H) Hosts
November 2020

Austria	Cancelled	Serbia
	Report

Rodney Parade, Newport
November 2020

Germany	Cancelled	Wales
	Report

Cardiff International Sports Stadium, Cardiff

November 2020

Austria	Cancelled	Germany
	Report

Cardiff International Sports Stadium, Cardiff
November 2020

Wales	Cancelled	Serbia
	Report

Rodney Parade, Newport

November 2020

Wales	Cancelled	Austria
	Report

Cardiff International Sports Stadium, Cardiff
November 2020

Serbia	Cancelled	Germany
	Report

Rodney Parade, Newport

==== Group 2 ====
Pos	Team	Pld	W	D	L	GF	GA	GD	Pts
1	Spain (H)	0	0	0	0	0	0	0	0
2	Belgium	0	0	0	0	0	0	0	0
3	Bulgaria	0	0	0	0	0	0	0	0
4	North Macedonia	0	0	0	0	0	0	0	0

Source: UEFA
Rules for classification: Tiebreakers
(H) Hosts
November 2020

Spain	Cancelled	North Macedonia
	Report

Estadi Olímpic Camilo Cano, La Nucia
November 2020

Bulgaria	Cancelled	Belgium
	Report

Estadi Olímpic Camilo Cano, La Nucia

November 2020

Belgium	Cancelled	North Macedonia
	Report

Estadi Olímpic Camilo Cano, La Nucia
November 2020

Spain	Cancelled	Bulgaria
	Report

Estadi Olímpic Camilo Cano, La Nucia

November 2020

Belgium	Cancelled	Spain
	Report

Estadi Olímpic Camilo Cano, La Nucia
November 2020

North Macedonia	Cancelled	Bulgaria
	Report

Estadio El Collao, Alcoy

==== Group 3 ====
Pos	Team	Pld	W	D	L	GF	GA	GD	Pts
1	Georgia	0	0	0	0	0	0	0	0
2	Scotland	0	0	0	0	0	0	0	0
3	France (H)	0	0	0	0	0	0	0	0
4	Russia	0	0	0	0	0	0	0	0

Source: UEFA
Rules for classification: Tiebreakers
(H) Hosts
November 2020

France	Cancelled	Scotland
	Report

La Plaine des Sports, Saint-Paul-lès-Dax
November 2020

Georgia	Cancelled	Russia
	Report

Stade Municipal de l'Argenté, Mont-de-Marsan

November 2020

Georgia	Cancelled	France
	Report

Stade André Darrigade, Dax
November 2020

Scotland	Cancelled	Russia
	Report

Stade Municipal de l'Argenté, Mont-de-Marsan

November 2020

Scotland	Cancelled	Georgia
	Report

Stade André Darrigade, Dax
November 2020

Russia	Cancelled	France
	Report

La Plaine des Sports, Saint-Paul-lès-Dax

==== Group 4 ====
Pos	Team	Pld	W	D	L	GF	GA	GD	Pts
1	England	0	0	0	0	0	0	0	0
2	Ukraine	0	0	0	0	0	0	0	0
3	Denmark (H)	0	0	0	0	0	0	0	0
4	Latvia	0	0	0	0	0	0	0	0

Source: UEFA
Rules for classification: Tiebreakers
(H) Hosts
November 2020

England	Cancelled	Latvia
	Report

JYSK Park, Silkeborg
November 2020

Denmark	Cancelled	Ukraine
	Report

JYSK Park, Silkeborg

November 2020

Ukraine	Cancelled	Latvia
	Report

JYSK Park, Silkeborg
November 2020

England	Cancelled	Denmark
	Report

JYSK Park, Silkeborg

November 2020

Ukraine	Cancelled	England
	Report

Vorup Stadion, Randers
November 2020

Latvia	Cancelled	Denmark
	Report

JYSK Park, Silkeborg

==== Group 5 ====
Pos	Team	Pld	W	D	L	GF	GA	GD	Pts
1	Italy (H)	0	0	0	0	0	0	0	0
2	Norway	0	0	0	0	0	0	0	0
3	Iceland	0	0	0	0	0	0	0	0
4	Slovenia	0	0	0	0	0	0	0	0

Source: UEFA
Rules for classification: Tiebreakers
(H) Hosts
November 2020

Iceland	Cancelled	Norway
	Report

Stadio Fair Play di Cartigliano, Cartigliano
November 2020

Italy	Cancelled	Slovenia
	Report

Stadio Comunale di Abano Terme, Abano Terme

November 2020

Norway	Cancelled	Slovenia
	Report

Stadio Fair Play di Cartigliano, Cartigliano
November 2020

Italy	Cancelled	Iceland
	Report

Stadio Comunale di Mogliano Veneto, Mogliano Veneto

November 2020

Norway	Cancelled	Italy
	Report

Stadio Euganeo, Padua
November 2020

Slovenia	Cancelled	Iceland
	Report

Stadio Comunale di Abano Terme, Abano Terme

==== Group 6 ====
Pos	Team	Pld	W	D	L	GF	GA	GD	Pts
1	Portugal	0	0	0	0	0	0	0	0
2	Turkey	0	0	0	0	0	0	0	0
3	Croatia (H)	0	0	0	0	0	0	0	0
4	Slovakia	0	0	0	0	0	0	0	0

Source: UEFA
Rules for classification: Tiebreakers
(H) Hosts
November 2020

Portugal	Cancelled	Slovakia
	Report

Stadion Radnik, Velika Gorica
November 2020

Croatia	Cancelled	Turkey
	Report

Stadion Lučko, Zagreb

November 2020

Turkey	Cancelled	Slovakia
	Report

Stadion ŠRC Sesvete, Zagreb
November 2020

Portugal	Cancelled	Croatia
	Report

Stadion Radnik, Velika Gorica

November 2020

Turkey	Cancelled	Portugal
	Report

Stadion Lučko, Zagreb
November 2020

Slovakia	Cancelled	Croatia
	Report

Stadion ŠRC Sesvete, Zagreb

==== Group 7 ====
Pos	Team	Pld	W	D	L	GF	GA	GD	Pts
1	Netherlands (H)	0	0	0	0	0	0	0	0
2	Czech Republic	0	0	0	0	0	0	0	0
3	Switzerland	0	0	0	0	0	0	0	0
4	Finland	0	0	0	0	0	0	0	0

Source: UEFA
Rules for classification: Tiebreakers
(H) Hosts
November 2020

Switzerland	Cancelled	Czech Republic
	Report

Sportpark de Bosk, Harkema
November 2020

Netherlands	Cancelled	Finland
	Report

Sportpark Marsdijk, Assen

November 2020

Czech Republic	Cancelled	Finland
	Report

Sportpark Marsdijk, Assen
November 2020

Netherlands	Cancelled	Switzerland
	Report

Sportpark de Bosk, Harkema

November 2020

Czech Republic	Cancelled	Netherlands
	Report

Sportpark Marsdijk, Assen
November 2020

Finland	Cancelled	Switzerland
	Report

Sportpark de Bosk, Harkema

== Goalscorers ==
In the qualifying round, there were 306 goals scored in 78 matches, for an average of 3.92 goals per match.

8 goals

- (Switzerland) Lorent Tolaj

4 goals

- (Austria) Marcel Monsberger
- (Italy) Alessio Riccardi
- (Netherlands) Crysencio Summerville
- (Republic of Ireland) Tyreik Wright
- (Serbia) Lazar Pavlović
- (Switzerland) Darian Males

3 goals

- (Austria) Chukwubuike Adamu
- (Austria) Thierno Ballo
- (Czech Republic) Filip Firbacher
- (Germany) Leon Dajaku
- (Germany) Kevin Schade
- (Latvia) Roberts Zelmanis
- (Netherlands) Marouan Azarkan
- (Netherlands) Wouter Burger
- (Netherlands) Daishawn Redan
- (Slovenia) Nik Prelec
- (Slovenia) Renato Simič
- (Sweden) Benjamin Nygren
- (Switzerland) Orges Bunjaku
- (Ukraine) Danylo Sikan
- (Wales) Neco Williams

2 goals

- (Armenia) Zhirayr Shaghoyan
- (Austria) Amir Abdijanovic
- (Austria) Marlon Mustapha
- (Belgium) Charles De Ketelaere
- (Bulgaria) Filip Krastev
- (Bulgaria) Vladimir Nikolov
- (Croatia) Ivan Brnić
- (Czech Republic) Matěj Vít
- (Czech Republic) Jakub Zeronik
- (Denmark) Anis Ben Slimane
- (England) Bobby Duncan
- (England) James Garner
- (England) Anthony Gordon
- (England) Taylor Harwood-Bellis
- (France) Yanis Begraoui
- (France) Adrien Truffert
- (Georgia (country)) Zuriko Davitashvili
- (Georgia (country)) Giorgi Guliashvili
- (Georgia (country)) Giorgi Iakobidze
- (Germany) Lazar Samardzic
- (Greece) Panagiotis Tzimas
- (Hungary) Dominik Cipf
- (Hungary) Patrik Nyári
- (Iceland) Kristall Máni Ingason
- (Italy) Sebastiano Esposito
- (Latvia) Eduards Dašķevičs
- (Montenegro) Ivan Vukčević
- (Norway) Noah Jean Holm
- (Poland) Maik Nawrocki
- (Republic of Ireland) Jamie Bowden
- (Russia) Kirill Kosarev
- (Russia) Igor Shkolik
- (Serbia) Damjan Dostanić
- (Spain) Borja Sainz
- (Sweden) Jack Lahne
- (Turkey) Muhammet Arslantaş
- (Turkey) Taha Tunç
- (Turkey) Ali Yavuz Kol

1 goal

- (Albania) Armando Broja
- (Albania) Marvin Cuni
- (Albania) Armando Dobra
- (Albania) Angelo Ndrecka
- (Armenia) Narek Grigoryan
- (Armenia) Gevorg Tarakhchyan
- (Austria) Paul-Friedrich Koller
- (Austria) Alexander Prass
- (Austria) Matthias Seidl
- (Austria) Dalibor Velimirovic
- (Azerbaijan) Rufat Abdullazade
- (Azerbaijan) Tural Bayramov
- (Belarus) Roman Davyskiba
- (Belarus) Gleb Gurban
- (Belarus) Yevgeniy Kozel
- (Belarus) Vladislav Lozhkin
- (Belarus) Pavel Pashevich
- (Belarus) Dmitri Prischepa
- (Belgium) Antoine Colassin
- (Belgium) Arne Cuypers
- (Belgium) Nicolas Raskin
- (Belgium) Ignace Van Der Brempt
- (Bosnia and Herzegovina) Melvin Bajrović
- (Bosnia and Herzegovina) Andrej Đokanović
- (Bulgaria) Denislav Angelov
- (Bulgaria) Aleksandar Todorov
- (Bulgaria) Dimitar Tonev
- (Croatia) Mario Čuić
- (Croatia) Ivan Šarić
- (Croatia) Mario Vušković
- (Cyprus) Andronikos Kakoulli
- (Cyprus) Thomas Nikolaou
- (Cyprus) Daniil Paroutis
- (Czech Republic) Lukáš Červ
- (Czech Republic) Jakub Kosař
- (Czech Republic) Michal Szewieczek
- (Czech Republic) Tomáš Vlček
- (Denmark) Gustav Isaksen
- (Denmark) Frederik Winther
- (England) Xavier Amaechi
- (England) Faustino Anjorin
- (England) Tommy Doyle
- (England) Ethan Laird
- (England) Bukayo Saka
- (Finland) Terry Ablade
- (Finland) Arlind Sejdijaj
- (Finland) Jeremiah Streng
- (France) Ulrick Eneme Ella
- (France) Koba Koindredi
- (France) Arthur Zagre
- (Georgia (country)) Khvicha Kvaratskhelia
- (Georgia (country)) Anzor Mekvabishvili
- (Georgia (country)) Giorgi Moistsrapishvili
- (Germany) Kevin Ehlers
- (Germany) Tom Krauß
- (Germany) Oscar Schoenfelder
- (Germany) Niklas Tauer
- (Gibraltar) Craig Galliano
- (Greece) Andreas Athanasakopoulos
- (Greece) Giorgos Liavas
- (Greece) Vasilis Sourlis
- (Greece) Georgios Vagiannidis
- (Greece) Georgios Vrakas
- (Hungary) András Huszti
- (Hungary) Alen Skribek
- (Hungary) Kristóf Tóth-Gábor
- (Iceland) Atli Barkarson
- (Iceland) Andri Guðjohnsen
- (Iceland) Karl Fridleifur Gunnarsson
- (Iceland) Ísak Bergmann Jóhannesson
- (Iceland) Orri Hrafn Kjartansson
- (Iceland) Ísak Snær Þorvaldsson
- (Iceland) Valgeir Valgeirsson
- (Israel) Nir Drori
- (Israel) Nadav Niddam
- (Kazakhstan) Zhalgas Zhaksylykov
- (Kosovo) Adonis Aliu
- (Kosovo) Granit Berisha
- (Latvia) Raimonds Krollis
- (Latvia) Jēkabs Lagūns
- (Latvia) Raivis Viļumsons
- (Lithuania) Linas Zingertas
- (Montenegro) Luka Todorović
- (Montenegro) Nikša Vujanović
- (Montenegro) Milan Vukotić
- (Netherlands) Sepp van den Berg
- (Netherlands) Joshua Zirkzee
- (North Macedonia) Abdulvahit Murati
- (North Macedonia) David Toshevski
- (North Macedonia) Arbi Vosha
- (Norway) Kristoffer Askildsen
- (Norway) Emil Konradsen Ceide
- (Norway) Leo Cornic
- (Norway) Mustapha Fofana
- (Norway) Kornelius Hansen
- (Norway) Sivert Mannsverk
- (Norway) Edvard Tagseth
- (Poland) Bartosz Białek
- (Poland) Bartosz Bida
- (Republic of Ireland) Thomas Cannon
- (Republic of Ireland) Ryan Cassidy
- (Republic of Ireland) Oisin McEntee
- (Republic of Ireland) Mark McGuinness
- (Republic of Ireland) Andrew Omobamidele
- (Republic of Ireland) Lewis Richards
- (Republic of Ireland) Ross Tierney
- (Romania) David Miculescu
- (Russia) Danila Prokhin
- (Russia) Edgar Sevikyan
- (Russia) Ilya Vakhaniya
- (San Marino) Filippo Fabbri
- (Scotland) Jack Burroughs
- (Scotland) Jamie Hamilton
- (Scotland) Josh McPake
- (Scotland) Dapo Mebude
- (Scotland) Nathan Patterson
- (Serbia) Strahinja Eraković
- (Serbia) Stefan Radmanovac
- (Serbia) Dejan Zukić
- (Slovakia) Erik Bašista
- (Slovakia) Ján Bernát
- (Slovakia) Samuel Lavrinčík
- (Slovakia) Filip Lichý
- (Slovakia) Sebastian Nebyla
- (Slovenia) Matija Burin
- (Slovenia) Kai Cipot
- (Slovenia) Rok Maher
- (Slovenia) Jošt Urbančič
- (Spain) Miguel Gutiérrez
- (Spain) Víctor Mollejo
- (Spain) Pablo Ramón
- (Spain) Sergi Rosanas
- (Spain) Marc Tenas
- (Switzerland) Felix Mambimbi
- (Switzerland) Ilan Sauter
- (Switzerland) Simon Sohm
- (Switzerland) Julian Vonmoos
- (Sweden) Rami Hajal
- (Turkey) Atakan Gündüz
- (Turkey) Veysel Karani Ünal
- (Ukraine) Maksym Hirnyi
- (Ukraine) Mykhailo Mudryk
- (Ukraine) Artem Shulianskyi
- (Ukraine) Vikentii Voloshyn
- (Wales) Joe Adams
- (Wales) Keenan Patten
- (Wales) Sam Pearson
- (Wales) Harry Pinchard

1 own goal

- (Azerbaijan) Elnur Ibragimov (against Norway)
- (Estonia) Ralf-Sander Suvinõmm (against Sweden)
- (Finland) Noah Nurmi (against Faroe Islands)
- (Gibraltar) Shay Jones (against Republic of Ireland)
- (Slovakia) Jakub Surovčík (against Italy)
