= Wales national under-19 football team =

National association football team

Wales Under-19
- Nickname: Young Dragons (Welsh: Dreigiau Ifanc)
- Association: Football Association of Wales (FAW)
- Head coach: Jon Grey
| First colours | Second colours |

First international
- Northern Ireland 4–0 Wales (London, England; 15 April 1948)

Biggest win
- Gibraltar 2–9 Wales (Wrexham, Wales; 27 September 2022)

Biggest defeat
- Netherlands 11–2 Wales (Dordrecht, Netherlands; 6 March 1963)

World Cup
- Appearances: 0

UEFA U-19 Championship
- Appearances: 7 (first in 1948)
- Best result: First Round (6 times)

The Wales national under-19 football team is the national under-19 football team of Wales and is run by the Football Association of Wales. The team competes in the UEFA European Under-19 Championship held every year.

In 2019 the side qualified for the Elite Round of the European Under-19 Football Championship for the first time. In 2020 they qualified once again, after topping their qualifying group for the first time.

== Recent history ==
The under-19 squad is a proving ground for talented youngsters. Full international players like James Collins, Andy King, Joe Ledley, Wayne Hennessey, Chris Gunter, Gareth Bale, Joe Allen, Danny Ward, Connor Roberts, Harry Wilson, Daniel James, Ethan Ampadu, Joe Rodon and Neco Williams as well as most of the current Wales under-21 side, have progressed through the team.

== Players ==
Players born on or after 1 January 2008 are eligible.

=== Latest squad ===
The following players were called up for 2027 UEFA European Under-19 Championship qualification matches against Finland on 11 November, Spain on 14 November and Iceland on 17 November 2026.

Caps and goals correct as of 5 October 2026, after the match against Northern Ireland.

| No. | Pos. | Player | Date of birth (age) | Caps | Goals | Club |
|---|---|---|---|---|---|---|
| | GK | Eliot Meredith | 22 January 2008 (age 18) | 5 | 0 | (The Football Association) Coventry City |
| | GK | Oscar Abbotson | 5 January 2009 (age 17) | 1 | 0 | (The Football Association) Southampton |
| | DF | Luis Gardner | 27 January 2008 (age 18) | 12 | 1 | (The Football Association) Everton |
| | DF | Noah Williams | 25 January 2008 (age 18) | 12 | 0 | (Football Association of Wales) Cardiff City |
| | DF | Kaven Blonarczyk | 25 September 2008 (age 18) | 6 | 0 | (Football Association of Wales) Swansea City |
| | DF | Prince Kobe Cissé | 26 July 2008 (age 18) | 4 | 0 | (The Football Association) Liverpool |
| | DF | Tom Dearden | 7 November 2008 (age 18) | 2 | 0 | (The Football Association) Sheffield United |
| | DF | Carter Heywood | 1 January 2009 (age 17) | 2 | 0 | (Football Association of Wales) Swansea City |
| | DF | Ashton Williams | 13 May 2009 (age 17) | 0 | 0 | (The Football Association) Wolverhampton Wanderers |
| | MF | Lennon Moss | 1 December 2009 (age 16) | 6 | 0 | (The Football Association) Aston Villa |
| | MF | Milo Robinson | 1 March 2008 (age 18) | 6 | 0 | (Football Association of Wales) Swansea City |
| | MF | Rob Tankiewicz | 12 June 2009 (age 17) | 4 | 0 | (Football Association of Wales) Cardiff City |
| | MF | Oliver Salter | 10 August 2009 (age 17) | 0 | 0 | (The Football Association) Tottenham Hotspur |
| | FW | Ollie Dewsbury | 22 February 2008 (age 18) | 13 | 1 | (The Football Association) Farnborough (on loan from Bristol Rovers) |
| | FW | Louie Bradbury | 16 September 2008 (age 18) | 10 | 3 | (The Football Association) Stoke City |
| | FW | Will Grainger | 20 November 2008 (age 17) | 9 | 1 | (The Football Association) Sheffield Wednesday |
| | FW | Patrick Mlynarski | 26 July 2008 (age 18) | 6 | 0 | (The Football Association) Crewe Alexandra |
| | FW | Jack Sykes | 27 February 2009 (age 17) | 5 | 0 | (Football Association of Wales) Cardiff City |
| | FW | Shea Pita | 3 May 2009 (age 17) | 4 | 0 | (The Football Association) Everton |
| | FW | Leon Scarlett | 16 August 2009 (age 17) | 0 | 0 | (The Football Association) Queens Park Rangers |

=== Recent call-ups ===
The following players have also been called up to the Wales under-19 squad within the last twelve months and remain eligible.

| Pos. | Player | Date of birth (age) | Caps | Goals | Club | Latest call-up |
|---|---|---|---|---|---|---|
| GK | Tom Wright | 14 September 2008 (age 18) | 1 | 0 | (Wales) Swansea City | v. Northern Ireland, 5 October 2026 |
| DF | Jameson Blackmore | 8 April 2008 (age 18) | 3 | 0 | (England) Oxford United | v. Northern Ireland, 5 October 2026 |
| DF | Ashton Sizer | 26 May 2009 (age 17) | 3 | 0 | (England) Portsmouth | v. Northern Ireland, 5 October 2026 |
| DF | Jayden Lienou | 8 April 2008 (age 18) | 12 | 0 | (England) Leeds United | 2026 UEFA European Under-19 Championship |
| DF | Connor Thorley | 26 September 2008 (age 18) | 1 | 0 | (Wales) Wrexham | v. Hungary, 31 March 2026 |
| DF | Theo Pitt | 5 September 2009 (age 17) | 0 | 0 | (England) Blackburn Rovers | v. Hungary, 31 March 2026 |
| MF | Paul Moreno | 11 January 2010 (age 16) | 5 | 0 | (Wales) Cardiff City | v. Northern Ireland, 5 October 2026 |
| MF | Alex Marciniak | 18 January 2008 (age 18) | 4 | 0 | (Poland) Cracovia | v. Northern Ireland, 5 October 2026 |
| MF | Hayden Allmark | 10 July 2008 (age 18) | 3 | 0 | (Wales) Cardiff City | v. Northern Ireland, 5 October 2026 |
| MF | Alex Godfrey | 4 October 2009 (age 17) | 3 | 0 | (Wales) Swansea City | v. Northern Ireland, 5 October 2026 |
| MF | Isaac Thomas | 3 September 2009 (age 17) | 0 | 0 | (England) West Ham United | v. Hungary, 31 March 2026 |
| FW | Axel Donczew | 15 February 2010 (age 16) | 6 | 0 | (England) Arsenal | v. Northern Ireland, 5 October 2026 |

== Results and fixtures ==
=== 2020 UEFA European Under-19 Championship qualification ===
==== Group 5 ====
| Pos | Team | Pld | W | D | L | GF | GA | GD | Pts | Qualification |
|---|---|---|---|---|---|---|---|---|---|---|
| 1 | Wales (H) | 3 | 2 | 1 | 0 | 7 | 2 | +5 | 7 | Elite round |
| 2 | Russia | 3 | 1 | 2 | 0 | 7 | 3 | +4 | 5 | Elite round |
| 3 | Poland | 3 | 1 | 0 | 2 | 4 | 8 | −4 | 3 | |
| 4 | Kosovo | 3 | 0 | 1 | 2 | 2 | 7 | −5 | 1 | |

Source: UEFA
Rules for classification: Tiebreakers
(H) Hosts
13 November 2019
14:00 (13:00 GMT)

| Russia | 1–1 | Kosovo |
|---|---|---|
| Shkolik 12' | Report | Aliu 11' |

Cardiff International Sports Stadium, Cardiff
Referee: Volen Chinkov (Bulgaria)
13 November 2019
14:00 (13:00 GMT)

| Wales | 3–0 | Poland |
|---|---|---|
| Adams 23'; Pearson 37'; Patten 53' | Report |

Rodney Parade, Newport
Referee: Maurizio Mariani (Italy)

16 November 2019
14:00 (13:00 GMT)

| Russia | 2–2 | Wales |
|---|---|---|
| Kosarev 30'; Prokhin 85' | Report | Williams 66' (pen.), 82' (pen.) |

Cardiff International Sports Stadium, Cardiff
Referee: Ville Nevalainen (Finland)
16 November 2019
14:00 (13:00 GMT)

| Poland | 4–1 | Kosovo |
|---|---|---|
| Nawrocki 40', 42'; Białek 45+2'; Bida 90+3' | Report | Berisha 88' |

Dragon Park, Newport
Referee: Volen Chinkov (Bulgaria)

19 November 2019
14:00 (13:00 GMT)

| Poland | 0–4 | Russia |
|---|---|---|
| | Report | Kosarev 20'; Vakhaniya 37'; Sevikyan 50'; Shkolik 66' |

Cardiff International Sports Stadium, Cardiff
Referee: Maurizio Mariani (Italy)
19 November 2019
14:00 (13:00 GMT)

| Kosovo | 0–2 | Wales |
|---|---|---|
| | Report | Pinchard 45+1'; Williams 76' |

Rodney Parade, Newport
Referee: Ville Nevalainen (Finland)

=== 2019 UEFA European Under-19 Championship qualification ===
==== Group 4 ====
| Pos | Team | Pld | W | D | L | GF | GA | GD | Pts | Qualification |
|---|---|---|---|---|---|---|---|---|---|---|
| 1 | Scotland | 3 | 2 | 1 | 0 | 9 | 3 | +6 | 7 | Elite round |
| 2 | Wales (H) | 3 | 2 | 0 | 1 | 5 | 3 | +2 | 6 | Elite round |
| 3 | Sweden | 3 | 1 | 1 | 1 | 5 | 5 | 0 | 4 | |
| 4 | San Marino | 3 | 0 | 0 | 3 | 1 | 9 | −8 | 0 | |

Source: UEFA
Rules for classification: Qualification tiebreakers
(H) Hosts
14 November 2018
17:00 (16:00 GMT)

| Sweden | 2–1 | San Marino |
|---|---|---|
| Mbunga-Kimpioka 54'; Moretti 60' (o.g.) | Report | Moretti 67' |

Nantporth, Bangor
Referee: Alexandr Aliyev (Kazakhstan)
14 November 2018
18:00 (17:00 GMT)

| Wales | 1–2 | Scotland |
|---|---|---|
| Williams 68' | Report | Cooper 60' (o.g.); Gilmour 85' (pen.) |

Belle Vue, Rhyl
Referee: Juri Frischer (Estonia)

17 November 2018
15:00 (14:00 GMT)

| Scotland | 5–0 | San Marino |
|---|---|---|
| Awokoya-Mebude 21'; Aitchison 23', 40'; Gilmour 35'; Ross 90+2' | Report |

Belle Vue, Rhyl
Referee: Alexandr Aliyev (Kazakhstan)
17 November 2018
16:00 (15:00 GMT)

| Sweden | 1–2 | Wales |
|---|---|---|
| Mbunga-Kimpioka 31' | Report | Adams 13'; Norton 63' |

Nantporth, Bangor
Referee: Dumitri Muntean (Moldova)

20 November 2018
16:00 (15:00 GMT)

| Scotland | 2–2 | Sweden |
|---|---|---|
| Gilmour 20' (pen.); Watt 83' | Report | Ousou 71'; Vagic 73' |

Belle Vue, Rhyl
Referee: Juri Frischer (Estonia)
20 November 2018
16:00 (15:00 GMT)

| San Marino | 0–2 | Wales |
|---|---|---|
| | Report | Collins 52'; Bowen 83' |

Nantporth, Bangor
Referee: Dumitri Muntean (Moldova)

=== 2018 UEFA European Under-19 Championship qualification ===
==== Group 13 ====
| Pos | Team | Pld | W | D | L | GF | GA | GD | Pts | Qualification |
|---|---|---|---|---|---|---|---|---|---|---|
| 1 | Slovakia | 3 | 2 | 1 | 0 | 5 | 3 | +2 | 7 | Elite round |
| 2 | Turkey (H) | 3 | 2 | 0 | 1 | 7 | 4 | +3 | 6 | Elite round |
| 3 | Kazakhstan | 3 | 1 | 1 | 1 | 3 | 5 | −2 | 4 | |
| 4 | Wales | 3 | 0 | 0 | 3 | 4 | 7 | −3 | 0 | |

Source: UEFA
Rules for classification: Qualification tiebreakers
(H) Hosts
7 November 2017
11:30

| Wales | 1–2 | Slovakia |
|---|---|---|
| Touray 62' | Report | Vician 43'; Král’ovič 76' |

Arslan Zeki Demirci Sports Complex – Emir Hotels 2, Manavgat
Referee: Alexandre Boucaut (Belgium)
10 November 2017
14:00

| Turkey | 2–1 | Wales |
|---|---|---|
| Lewis 19' (o.g.); Oktay 67' | Report | Cullen 90' (pen.) |

Arslan Zeki Demirci Sports Complex – Emir Hotels 1, Manavgat
Referee: Dejan Jakimovski (Macedonia)
13 November 2017
13:00

| Kazakhstan | 3–2 | Wales |
|---|---|---|
| Zhakipbayev 45+2', 69'; Pairuz 76' | Report | Spruce 11'; Cullen 82' (pen.) |

Arslan Zeki Demirci Sports Complex – Emir Hotels 2, Manavgat
Referee: Dejan Jakimovksi (Macedonia)

=== 2017 UEFA European Under-19 Championship qualification round ===
==== Group 6 ====
| Pos | Team | Pld | W | D | L | GF | GA | GD | Pts | Qualification |
|---|---|---|---|---|---|---|---|---|---|---|
| 1 | England | 3 | 2 | 0 | 1 | 6 | 3 | +3 | 6 | Elite round |
| 2 | Greece | 3 | 2 | 0 | 1 | 7 | 2 | +5 | 6 | Elite round |
| 3 | Wales (H) | 3 | 2 | 0 | 1 | 9 | 6 | +3 | 6 | |
| 4 | Luxembourg | 3 | 0 | 0 | 3 | 2 | 13 | −11 | 0 | |

Source: UEFA
Rules for classification: Qualification tiebreakers
(H) Hosts
10 November 2016
16:00

| Wales | 0–2 | Greece |
|---|---|---|
| | Report | Mingos 59'; Nikolaou 78' |

Racecourse Ground, Wrexham
Referee: Ivaylo Stoyanov (Bulgaria)
12 November 2016
18:00

| England | 2–3 | Wales |
|---|---|---|
| Harris 63' (o.g.); Alexander-Arnold 73' (pen.) | Report | Broadhead 35' (pen.), 75'; Harris 61' |

Nantporth, Bangor
Referee: Benoît Millot (France)
15 November 2016
18:00

| Luxembourg | 2–6 | Wales |
|---|---|---|
| Da Costa 4'; Brandenburger 35' (pen.) | Report | Woodburn 21', 50'; Broadhead 38', 71', 81'; Cullen 54' |

Nantporth, Bangor
Referee: Donatas Rumšas (Lithuania)

== See also ==
- UEFA European Under-19 Football Championship
- Football Association of Wales
- Wales national football team
- Wales national under-21 football team
- Wales national under-20 football team
- Wales national under-18 football team
- Wales national under-17 football team
