= 2021–22 Deportivo Alavés season =

Deportivo Alavés
2021–22 season
- President: Alfonso Fernández de Trocóniz
- Head coach: Javier Calleja (until 28 December); José Luis Mendilibar (from 28 December to 4 April); Julio Velázquez (from 5 April)
- Stadium: Mendizorrotza
- La Liga: 20th (relegated)
- Copa del Rey: Second round
- Top goalscorer: League: Joselu (14); All: Joselu (14)
- Highest home attendance: 10,227 vs Real Betis (18 October 2021)
- Lowest home attendance: 9,836 vs Atlético Madrid (25 September 2021)
- Biggest win: Cádiz 0–2 Alavés
- Biggest defeat: Alavés 1–4 Real Madrid; Valencia 3–0 Alavés
Home colours	Away colours	Third colours

The 2021–22 season was the 101st season in the existence of Deportivo Alavés and the club's sixth consecutive season in the top flight of Spanish football. In addition to the domestic league, Alavés participated in this season's edition of the Copa del Rey.

== Players ==
=== First-team squad ===
As of 1 February 2022

Note: Flags indicate national team as defined under FIFA eligibility rules; some limited exceptions apply. Players may hold more than one non-FIFA nationality.

No.	Pos.	Nation	Player
1	GK	ESP	Fernando Pacheco (vice-captain)
2	DF	ARG	Nahuel Tenaglia (on loan from Talleres de Córdoba)
3	DF	ESP	Rubén Duarte
4	DF	USA	Matt Miazga (on loan from Chelsea)
5	DF	ESP	Víctor Laguardia (captain)
6	MF	SEN	Mamadou Loum (on loan from FC Porto)
7	FW	ESP	Manu Vallejo (on loan from Valencia)
8	MF	ESP	Tomás Pina
9	FW	ESP	Joselu
10	FW	SWE	John Guidetti
11	FW	ESP	Luis Rioja
12	DF	ESP	Saúl García
13	GK	ESP	Antonio Sivera
14	MF	ESP	Manu García (on loan from Sporting Gijón)

No.	Pos.	Nation	Player
15	MF	ESP	Toni Moya
16	MF	ARG	Gonzalo Escalante (on loan from Lazio)
17	MF	ESP	Édgar Méndez
18	FW	URU	Facundo Pellistri (on loan from Manchester United)
20	MF	ESP	Pere Pons
21	DF	ESP	Martín Aguirregabiria
22	DF	FRA	Florian Lejeune
23	DF	ESP	Ximo Navarro
24	FW	ESP	Miguel de la Fuente
25	MF	ESP	Jason
26	DF	MAR	Abdel Abqar
27	DF	ESP	Javi López
31	GK	GEQ	Jesús Owono

=== Reserve team ===
Note: Flags indicate national team as defined under FIFA eligibility rules; some limited exceptions apply. Players may hold more than one non-FIFA nationality.

No.	Pos.	Nation	Player
28	MF	GEQ	Álex Balboa
30	MF	ESP	Tomás Mendes
36	DF	ROU	Alexandru Țîrlea

No.	Pos.	Nation	Player
40	FW	ESP	Marc Tenas
41	FW	ESP	Unai Ropero

=== Out on loan ===
Note: Flags indicate national team as defined under FIFA eligibility rules; some limited exceptions apply. Players may hold more than one non-FIFA nationality.

No.	Pos.	Nation	Player
—	GK	ESP	Aritz Castro (at Arenas Getxo until 30 June 2022)
—	DF	ESP	Tachi (at Fuenlabrada until 30 June 2022)
—	DF	ESP	Carlos Isaac (at Oviedo until 30 June 2022)
—	MF	MTN	Abdallahi Mahmoud (at (Croatia) Istra 1961 until 30 June 2022)
—	MF	ESP	Antonio Perera (at (Croatia) Istra 1961 until 30 June 2022)

No.	Pos.	Nation	Player
—	MF	PAN	José Luis Rodríguez (at Sporting Gijón until 30 June 2022)
—	MF	ESP	Borja Sainz (at Zaragoza until 30 June 2022)
—	FW	SEN	Mamadou Sylla (at Rayo Vallecano until 30 June 2022)
—	FW	JPN	Taichi Hara (at (Belgium) Sint-Truiden until 30 June 2022)

== Transfers ==
=== In ===
Date	Player	From	Type	Fee	Ref
1 July 2021	(Spain) Toni Moya	Atlético Madrid B	Transfer	Free	
20 August 2021	(Senegal) Mamadou Sylla	Girona	Transfer	€1,150,000	
12 January 2022	(Argentina) Nahuel Tenaglia	Talleres	Loan	€450,000	

=== Out ===
Date	Player	To	Type	Fee	Ref
30 June 2021	(Argentina) Rodrigo Battaglia	(Portugal) Sporting CP	Loan return		
30 June 2021	(Spain) Iñigo Córdoba	Athletic Bilbao	Loan return		
30 June 2021	(Brazil) Deyverson	(Brazil) Palmeiras	Loan return		
30 June 2021	(Spain) Manu García	Unattached	Transfer	Free	
30 June 2021	(France) Florian Lejeune	(England) Newcastle United	Loan return		
30 June 2021	(Uruguay) Facundo Pellistri	(England) Manchester United	Loan return		
1 July 2021	(Argentina) Ramón Miérez	(Croatia) Osijek	Buyout clause	€2.5M	
1 July 2021	(Benin) Olivier Verdon	(Bulgaria) Ludogorets Razgrad	Buyout clause	€1M	

== Pre-season and friendlies ==
Win Draw Loss Fixtures

14 July 2021 Friendly	Alavés	1–3	SD Logroñés	Vitoria-Gasteiz, Spain
19:00 CEST (UTC+2)	Pérez 28'	Report	Lozano 44'; Soberón 62', 78' (pen.)	Stadium: Ciudad Deportiva José Luis Compañón; Attendance: 0

17 July 2021 Friendly	Alavés	5–2	Amorebieta	Vitoria-Gasteiz, Spain
18:00 CEST (UTC+2)	Martín 1'; Rioja 16'; Guidetti 52'; García 82'; Gagua 90'	Report	Obieta 48'; Unzueta 67' (pen.)	Stadium: Ciudad Deportiva José Luis Compañón; Attendance: 0 Referee: Aitor Barrio Salas

24 July 2021 Friendly	Real Sociedad	3–1	Alavés	San Sebastián, Spain
19:00 CEST (UTC+2)	Januzaj 8'; Pacheco 43'; Zubeldia 69'	Report	Pérez 16' (pen.)	Stadium: Anoeta; Referee: Daniel Palencia Caballero

28 July 2021 Friendly	Alavés	1–0	Mirandés	Logroño, Spain
18:30 CEST (UTC+2)	Gagua 79'	Report		Stadium: Estadio Las Gaunas

31 July 2021 Friendly	Alavés	0–1	Elche	Murcia, Spain
19:00 CEST (UTC+2)	García (yellow card) 28'	Report	Carrillo 33'	Stadium: La Manga Club Football Center

6 August 2021 Friendly	Alavés	4–3	Al-Nasr	Murcia, Spain
10:00 CEST (UTC+2)	Méndez 26', 63'; Godoy 81'; Pérez 90+1'	Report	Tozé 57' (pen.); Saba 74'; Abeid 79'	Stadium: La Manga Club Football Center

6 August 2021 Friendly	Levante	0–1	Alavés	San Pedro del Pinatar, Spain
20:00 CEST (UTC+2)		Report	Joselu 90+2' (pen.)	Stadium: Pinatar Arena Football Center

9 September 2021 Friendly	Sevilla	1–0	Alavés	Seville, Spain
20:30 CEST (UTC+2)	Rodríguez 44'	Report		Stadium: Ramón Sánchez Pizjuán

8 October 2021 Friendly	Osasuna	2–1	Alavés	Pamplona, Spain
11:00 CEST (UTC+2)	Ávila 6'; Grau (yellow card) 30'; Barbero 73'	Report	Abqar (yellow card) 56'; Miguel 59'	Stadium: Tajonar Facilities; Attendance: 300; Referee: Gaizka Legarra Gorgoñón

27 January 2022 Friendly	Osasuna	0–1	Alavés	Pamplona, Spain
12:00 CET (UTC+1)		Report	Méndez 90'	Stadium: El Sadar; Attendance: 5,500; Referee: Eduardo Prieto Iglesias

25 March 2022 Friendly	Bordeaux	2–1	Alavés	Bayonne, France
13:00 CET (UTC+1)	Niang 77'; Mangas 84'	Report	De la Fuente 9'	Stadium: Stade Didier Deschamps

== Competitions ==
=== Overall record ===
Competition	First match	Last match	Starting round	Final position	Record							
Competition	First match	Last match	Starting round	Final position	Pld	W	D	L	GF	GA	GD	Win %
La Liga	14 August 2021	22 May 2022	Matchday 1	20th	38	8	7	23	31	65	−34	21.05
Copa del Rey	30 November 2021	14 December 2021	First round	Second round	2	1	0	1	4	2	+2	50.00
Total					40	9	7	24	35	67	−32	22.50

Source: Soccerway

=== La Liga ===
==== League table ====
Pos	Team	Pld	W	D	L	GF	GA	GD	Pts	Qualification or relegation
16	Mallorca	38	10	9	19	36	63	−27	39 (Note: Head-to-head points: Getafe 8, Mallorca 5, Cádiz 2.)	
17	Cádiz	38	8	15	15	35	51	−16	39	
18	Granada (R)	38	8	14	16	44	61	−17	38	Relegation to Segunda División
19	Levante (R)	38	8	11	19	51	76	−25	35	Relegation to Segunda División
20	Alavés (R)	38	8	7	23	31	65	−34	31	Relegation to Segunda División

Source: LaLiga Santander
Rules for classification: 1) Points; 2) Head-to-head points; 3) Head-to-head goal difference; 4) Goal difference; 5) Goals scored; 6) Fair-play points (Note: Head-to-head record is used only after all the matches between the teams in question have been played)
(R) Relegated

==== Results summary ====
Overall								Home						Away					
Pld	W	D	L	GF	GA	GD	Pts	W	D	L	GF	GA	GD	W	D	L	GF	GA	GD
38	8	7	23	31	65	−34	31	7	4	8	17	21	−4	1	3	15	14	44	−30

Source: La Liga

==== Results by round ====
Round	1	2	3	4	5	6	7	8	9	10	11	12	13	14	15	16	17	18	19	20	21	22	23	24	25	26	27	28	29	30	31	32	33	34	35	36	37	38
Ground	H	H	A	A	H	A	H	A	H	A	H	A	H	A	H	A	H	A	H	H	A	H	A	H	A	A	H	A	H	A	A	H	A	H	A	H	A	H
Result	L	L	L	L	L	L	W	L	L	W	W	D	W	D	L	L	D	L	D	D	L	L	L	W	L	D	D	L	L	L	L	W	L	W	L	W	L	L
Position	19	19	20	20	20	20	19	19	19	18	16	17	14	14	15	17	17	18	18	18	18	19	19	18	19	19	19	19	19	20	20	20	20	19	20	19	20	20

Source: La Liga
A = Away; H = Home; W = Win; D = Draw; L = Loss

==== Matches ====
The league fixtures were announced on 30 June 2021.

14 August 2021 1	Alavés	1–4	Real Madrid	Vitoria-Gasteiz
22:00 CEST (UTC+2)	M. García (yellow card) 35'; Joselu 65' (pen.)	Report	Benzema 48', 62'; Bale (yellow card) 53'; Nacho 56'; Courtois (yellow card) 64'; Vinícius 90+2'	Stadium: Mendizorrotza; Attendance: 3,968; Referee: César Soto Grado

21 August 2021 2	Alavés	0–1	Mallorca	Vitoria-Gasteiz
17:00 CEST (UTC+2)	Lejeune (yellow card) 38'; Duarte (yellow card) 45+2' (yellow-red card) 66'	Report	Maffeo (yellow card) 60'; Amath (yellow card) 72'; Niño 80'; Rodríguez (yellow card) 90+5'	Stadium: Mendizorrotza; Attendance: 2,896; Referee: Alejandro Muñiz Ruiz

27 August 2021 3	Valencia	3–0	Alavés	Valencia
22:15 CEST (UTC+2)	Wass 3'; Soler 45+3'; Guedes 60'	Report	Lejeune (yellow card) 28'; Loum (yellow card) 45'; Pacheco (yellow card) 61'; Miazga (yellow card) 61'	Stadium: Mestalla; Attendance: 10,627; Referee: Miguel Ángel Ortiz Arias

18 September 2021 5	Alavés	0–2	Osasuna	Vitoria-Gasteiz
21:00 CEST (UTC+2)	Laguardia (yellow card) 13'; Moya (yellow card) 28'; Duarte (yellow card) 29'; Navarro (yellow card) 70'	Report	D. García 22'; Torres 29' (pen.), (yellow card) 31'; Torró (yellow card) 73'; Sánchez (yellow card) 82'	Stadium: Mendizorrotza; Attendance: 8,176; Referee: Alejandro Hernández Hernández

22 September 2021 6	Espanyol	1–0	Alavés	Cornellà de Llobregat
19:30 CEST (UTC+2)	De Tomás 54' (pen.); Cabrera (yellow card) 90+3'	Report	Duarte (yellow card) 53'	Stadium: RCDE Stadium; Attendance: 14,254; Referee: Mario Melero López

25 September 2021 7	Alavés	1–0	Atlético Madrid	Vitoria-Gasteiz
14:00 CEST (UTC+2)	Laguardia 4'; Sylla (yellow card) 31'; Loum (yellow card) 36'	Report	Savić (yellow card) 17'; Trippier (yellow card) 53'; Kondogbia (yellow card) 55'	Stadium: Mendizorrotza; Attendance: 9,836; Referee: Antonio Mateu Lahoz

1 October 2021 8	Athletic Bilbao	1–0	Alavés	Bilbao
21:00 CEST (UTC+2)	R. García (penalty missed) 9', 44', (yellow card) 73'; Vencedor (yellow card) 38'; Berenguer (yellow card) 40'	Report	Navarro (yellow card) 8'; Pina (yellow card) 84'	Stadium: San Mamés; Attendance: 28,665; Referee: Carlos del Cerro Grande

18 October 2021 9	Alavés	0–1	Real Betis	Vitoria-Gasteiz
19:00 CEST (UTC+2)	Rioja (yellow card) 60'	Report	González (yellow card) 14'; Iglesias 89'	Stadium: Mendizorrotza; Attendance: 10,227; Referee: Miguel Ángel Ortiz Arias

23 October 2021 10	Cádiz	0–2	Alavés	Cádiz
16:15 CEST (UTC+2)		Report	Joselu 6' (pen.), 90+1'; Miazga (yellow card) 27'; Navarro (yellow card) 67'	Stadium: Nuevo Mirandilla; Attendance: 13,790; Referee: Javier Alberola Rojas

26 October 2021 11	Alavés	1–0	Elche	Vitoria-Gasteiz
19:00 CEST (UTC+2)	Navarro (yellow card) 18'; Loum 47'	Report	Roco (yellow card) 42'	Stadium: Mendizorrotza; Attendance: 10,206; Referee: Jesús Gil Manzano

30 October 2021 12	Barcelona	1–1	Alavés	Barcelona
21:00 CEST (UTC+2)	Depay 49'	Report	Sivera (yellow card) 45+5'; Rioja 52'; Duarte (yellow card) 82'	Stadium: Camp Nou; Attendance: 37,278; Referee: Jorge Figueroa Vázquez

6 November 2021 13	Alavés	2–1	Levante	Vitoria-Gasteiz
18:30 CET (UTC+1)	Moya (yellow card) 12'; Guidetti (yellow card) 71'; Joselu 77' (pen.), 90+1'; Laguardia (yellow card) 90+5'	Report	De Frutos 13'; Franquesa (yellow card) 55'; Cárdenas (yellow card) 90+1'; Pepelu (yellow card) 90+5'	Stadium: Mendizorrotza; Attendance: 12,176; Referee: Adrián Cordero Vega

20 November 2021 14	Sevilla	2–2	Alavés	Seville
16:15 CET (UTC+1)	Ocampos 38', (yellow card) 45+6'; Mir (yellow card) 60'; Rakitić 90+2'; Fernando (yellow card) 90+5'; Acuña (yellow card) 90+5'	Report	Laguardia 5'; Loum (yellow card) 45'; Joselu 45+7' (pen.); Duarte (yellow card) 50'; Méndez (yellow card) 73'; Lejeune (yellow card) 89'	Stadium: Ramón Sánchez Pizjuán; Attendance: 25,208; Referee: Alejandro Muñiz Ruiz

27 November 2021 15	Alavés	1–2	Celta Vigo	Vitoria-Gasteiz
14:00 CET (UTC+1)	Joselu 21'; Duarte (yellow card) 32'; Lejeune (yellow card) 38'; Aguirregabiria (yellow card) 57'	Report	Mina 11'; Méndez (yellow card) 51'; Aspas (penalty missed) 68', 70'; Tapia (yellow card) 85'	Stadium: Mendizorrotza; Attendance: 10,093; Referee: Pablo González Fuertes

3 December 2021 16	Granada	2–1	Alavés	Granada
21:00 CET (UTC+1)	Puertas 14'; Abram (yellow card) 40'; Eteki (yellow card) 79'; Arias 86'	Report	Laguardia (yellow card) 45+1'; Abram 81' (o.g.); López (yellow card) 86'	Stadium: Nuevo Los Cármenes; Attendance: 13,511; Referee: Javier Alberola Rojas

11 December 2021 17	Alavés	1–1	Getafe	Vitoria-Gasteiz
16:15 CET (UTC+1)	Aguirregabiria (yellow card) 45+4'; Joselu 86'; Lejeune (yellow card) 87' (yellow-red card) 90+2'; Rioja (yellow card) 88'	Report	Ünal 20'; Cuenca (yellow card) 41'; Arambarri (yellow card) 45+1'; Mata (yellow card) 69'; Soria (yellow card) 81'	Stadium: Mendizorrotza; Attendance: 10,065; Referee: César Soto Grado

18 December 2021 18	Rayo Vallecano	2–0	Alavés	Madrid
14:00 CET (UTC+1)	Trejo (yellow card) 10'; Guardiola 19'; Catena 26'	Report	Duarte (yellow card) 24'; Tachi (yellow card) 70'	Stadium: Campo de Fútbol de Vallecas; Attendance: 7,911; Referee: Juan Martínez Munuera

21 December 2021 4	Villarreal	5–2	Alavés	Villarreal
19:00 CET (UTC+1)	Gerard 18', 88'; Dia 27', 76'; Pino 79'	Report	Pons 44'; Loum (yellow card) 45+1'; López (yellow card) 49'; Joselu 65'	Stadium: Estadio de la Cerámica; Attendance: 12,530; Referee: Valentín Pizarro Gómez
Note: The match was originally scheduled for 11 September 2021, but was postponed due to the late return of several South American players from international duty.

2 January 2022 19	Alavés	1–1	Real Sociedad	Vitoria-Gasteiz
18:30 CET (UTC+1)	Laguardia (yellow card) 54'; Joselu 58' (pen.); Méndez (yellow card) 60'; Rioja (yellow card) 90'	Report	Januzaj 14', (yellow card) 85'; Zubeldia (yellow card) 56'; Silva (yellow card) 67'	Stadium: Mendizorrotza; Attendance: 13,498; Referee: Carlos del Cerro Grande

9 January 2022 20	Alavés	0–0	Athletic Bilbao	Vitoria-Gasteiz
18:30 CET (UTC+1)	Lejeune (yellow card) 26'; Duarte (yellow card) 61'	Report		Stadium: Mendizorrotza; Attendance: 14,103; Referee: Santiago Jaime Latre

18 January 2022 21	Real Betis	4–0	Alavés	Seville
20:00 CET (UTC+1)	Iglesias 11', 41'; Canales 29'; Juanmi 54'; González (yellow card) 72'; Guardado (yellow card) 81'	Report		Stadium: Benito Villamarín; Attendance: 38,753; Referee: José María Sánchez Martínez

23 January 2022 22	Alavés	0–1	Barcelona	Vitoria-Gasteiz
21:00 CET (UTC+1)		Report	F. de Jong 87'	Stadium: Mendizorrotza; Attendance: 14,056; Referee: Jorge Figueroa Vázquez

5 February 2022 23	Elche	3–1	Alavés	Elche
14:00 CET (UTC+1)	Milla 46', 58'; Verdú (yellow card) 67'; Fidel 86'	Report	Joselu 18'; Pina (yellow card) 90+4'	Stadium: Estadio Manuel Martínez Valero; Attendance: 12,923; Referee: Mario Melero López

13 February 2022 24	Alavés	2–1	Valencia	Vitoria-Gasteiz
14:00 CET (UTC+1)	Loum 14'; Tenaglia (yellow card) 37'; Pina (yellow card) 45+2'; Escalante (yellow card) 61'; Joselu 76' (pen.); Laguardia (yellow card) 90+7'	Report	Guedes 62' (pen.); Diakhaby (yellow card) 76'; Lato (yellow card) 84'; Gil (yellow card) 88'	Stadium: Mendizorrotza; Attendance: 12,845; Referee: Adrián Cordero Vega

19 February 2022 25	Real Madrid	3–0	Alavés	Madrid
21:00 CET (UTC+1)	Modrić (yellow card) 33'; Asensio 63'; Vinícius 80'; Benzema 90' (pen.)	Report	Loum (yellow card) 48'	Stadium: Santiago Bernabéu; Attendance: 42,180; Referee: José Luis Munuera Montero

26 February 2022 26	Getafe	2–2	Alavés	Getafe
16:15 CET (UTC+1)	Cuenca (red card) 32'; Suárez (yellow card) 43'; Aleñá (yellow card) 49'; Ünal 55', 72'	Report	Loum (yellow card) 39'; Méndez (yellow card) 44', (goal) 56'; Escalante 45+1', (yellow card) 76'; Laguardia (yellow card) 58'	Stadium: Coliseum Alfonso Pérez; Attendance: 7,720; Referee: Santiago Jaime Latre

4 March 2022 27	Alavés	0–0	Sevilla	Vitoria-Gasteiz
21:00 CET (UTC+1)	Lejeune (yellow card) 34'; Duarte (yellow card) 49'; Pons (yellow card) 62'	Report	Jordán (yellow card) 12'	Stadium: Mendizorrotza; Attendance: 13,121; Referee: Javier Alberola Rojas

13 March 2022 28	Real Sociedad	1–0	Alavés	San Sebastián
18:30 CET (UTC+1)	Illarramendi (yellow card) 21'; Zubimendi 70'	Report	Laguardia (yellow card) 27'	Stadium: Anoeta; Attendance: 31,573; Referee: Jorge Figueroa Vázquez

19 March 2022 29	Alavés	2–3	Granada	Vitoria-Gasteiz
14:00 CET (UTC+1)	Loum (yellow card) 4'; Joselu (penalty missed) 26'; Tenaglia (yellow card) 41'; Escalante 52', (yellow card) 90+6'; Vallejo 57'; De la Fuente (yellow card) 90'	Report	Quini (yellow card) 27'; Uzuni (yellow card) 45+3'; Escudero 50', (yellow card) 90+8'; Petrović (yellow card) 61'; Puertas 77'; Suárez 87'; Sánchez (yellow card) 90'; Díaz (yellow card) 90+8'; Aarón (red card) 90+8'	Stadium: Mendizorrotza; Attendance: 16,209; Referee: Guillermo Cuadra Fernández

2 April 2022 30	Atlético Madrid	4–1	Alavés	Madrid
21:00 CEST (UTC+2)	Félix 11', 82'; Llorente (yellow card) 72'; Suárez 75' (pen.), 90'	Report	Escalante 63'	Stadium: Wanda Metropolitano; Attendance: 51,467; Referee: Mario Melero López

10 April 2022 31	Osasuna	1–0	Alavés	Pamplona
14:00 CEST (UTC+2)	Vidal (yellow card) 9'; Budimir (yellow card) 29', (goal) 90+2'; R. García (penalty missed) 37'; Torró (yellow card) 45+3'	Report	Loum (yellow card) 15'	Stadium: El Sadar; Attendance: 19,220; Referee: Alejandro Muñiz Ruiz

16 April 2022 32	Alavés	1–0	Rayo Vallecano	Vitoria-Gasteiz
16:15 CEST (UTC+2)	Escalante (yellow card) 45+3'; Joselu 64'; Duarte (yellow card) 90+9'	Report	Nteka (yellow card) 55'; Balliu (red card) 88'; Maraš (yellow card) 90+3'; Palazón (yellow card) 90+8'	Stadium: Mendizorrotza; Attendance: 10,165; Referee: Juan Martínez Munuera

19 April 2022 33	Mallorca	2–1	Alavés	Palma
19:00 CEST (UTC+2)	Abdón 11'; Baba (yellow card) 24'; Muriqi 45+4', (yellow card) 83'	Report	García (yellow card) 35'; Escalante (yellow card) 45+2'; Méndez (yellow card) 57'; Raíllo 73' (o.g.); Loum (yellow card) 73'; Guidetti (yellow card) 90+6'; Laguardia (yellow card) 90+7'	Stadium: Visit Mallorca Stadium; Attendance: 15,264; Referee: César Soto Grado

30 April 2022 34	Alavés	2–1	Villarreal	Vitoria-Gasteiz
14:00 CEST (UTC+2)	Laguardia 4', (yellow card) 80'; Escalante 31', (yellow card) 69'; García (yellow card) 52'; Duarte (yellow card) 90+2'; Jason (yellow card) 90+5'	Report	Dia (yellow card) 41'; Chukwueze 47'; Capoue (yellow card) 76'	Stadium: Mendizorrotza; Attendance: 12,579; Referee: Miguel Ángel Ortiz Arias

7 May 2022 35	Celta Vigo	4–0	Alavés	Vigo
18:30 CEST (UTC+2)	Galhardo 6'; Aspas 34', 66'; Cervi (yellow card) 42'; Navarro 57' (o.g.)	Report	Loum (yellow card) 24'; Pina (yellow card) 38'; Méndez (yellow card) 53'; Navarro (red card) 64'	Stadium: Balaídos; Attendance: 10,567; Referee: Guillermo Cuadra Fernández

11 May 2022 36	Alavés	2–1	Espanyol	Vitoria-Gasteiz
19:00 CEST (UTC+2)	De la Fuente 7'; Loum (yellow card) 41'; Escalante 59'; Laguardia (yellow card) 90'; Tenas (yellow card) 90+4'	Report	De Tomás 14' (pen.); Herrera (yellow card) 30' (yellow-red card) 46'; Vidal (yellow card) 40'	Stadium: Mendizorrotza; Attendance: 12,729; Referee: Valentín Pizarro Gómez

15 May 2022 37	Levante	3–1	Alavés	Valencia
19:30 CEST (UTC+2)	Campaña (yellow card) 17'; Morales (yellow card) 29', (goal) 90+5'; Saracchi (yellow card) 35'; Duarte 53'; Malsa (yellow card) 58'; Roger 75'; Son (yellow card) 81'; Soldado (yellow card) 86'; Vezo (yellow card) 90'; Coke (yellow card) 90+3'	Report	Joselu 36'; Pons (yellow card) 38'; De la Fuente (yellow card) 54'; Méndez (yellow card) 71'; Escalante (yellow card) 86'; Tenas (yellow card) 89'; Lejeune (yellow card) 90+6'	Stadium: Ciutat de València; Attendance: 12,438; Referee: Guillermo Cuadra Fernández

22 May 2022 38	Alavés	0–1	Cádiz	Vitoria-Gasteiz
20:00 CEST (UTC+2)		Report	Hernández (yellow card) 27'; Lozano 76'	Stadium: Mendizorrotza; Attendance: 11,138; Referee: José María Sánchez Martínez

=== Copa del Rey ===
30 November 2021 First round	Unami	0–3	Alavés	Segovia
19:00 CET (UTC+1)	De la Cruz (yellow card) 48'; Cámara (yellow card) 61'; Terleira (yellow card) 63'; De Miguel (yellow card) 72'	Report	De la Fuente (yellow card) 18'; Guidetti 66'; Sylla 82'; Rioja 90+1', (yellow card) 90+5'	Stadium: La Albuera; Referee: Miguel Ángel Ortiz Arias

14 December 2021 Second round	Linares	2–1	Alavés	Linares
21:00 CET (UTC+1)	Etxaniz 19', (yellow card) 55'; Díaz (yellow card) 66'; Copete 73'; Perejón (yellow card) 86'	Report	Méndez (yellow card) 37'; Tachi (yellow card) 65'; Sylla 67'	Stadium: Estadio de Linarejos; Referee: Isidro Díaz de Mera Escuderos

== Statistics ==
=== Appearances and goals ===
Last updated on 23 May 2021.

No.	Pos	Nat	Player	Total		La Liga		Copa del Rey	
No.	Pos	Nat	Player	Apps	Goals	Apps	Goals	Apps	Goals
Goalkeepers
1	GK	(Spain) ESP	Fernando Pacheco	0	0	0	0	0	0
13	GK	(Spain) ESP	Antonio Sivera	0	0	0	0	0	0
Defenders
2	DF	(Spain) ESP	Tachi	0	0	0	0	0	0
3	DF	(Spain) ESP	Rubén Duarte	0	0	0	0	0	0
4	DF	(United States) USA	Matt Miazga	0	0	0	0	0	0
5	DF	(Spain) ESP	Víctor Laguardia	0	0	0	0	0	0
21	DF	(Spain) ESP	Martín Aguirregabiria	0	0	0	0	0	0
22	DF	(France) FRA	Florian Lejeune	0	0	0	0	0	0
23	DF	(Spain) ESP	Ximo Navarro	0	0	0	0	0	0
26	DF	(Spain) ESP	Javi López	0	0	0	0	0	0
Midfielders
6	MF	(Senegal) SEN	Mamadou Loum	0	0	0	0	0	0
8	MF	(Spain) ESP	Tomás Pina	0	0	0	0	0	0
14	MF	(Spain) ESP	Manu García	0	0	0	0	0	0
16	MF	(Spain) ESP	Édgar Méndez	0	0	0	0	0	0
20	MF	(Spain) ESP	Pere Pons	0	0	0	0	0	0
37	MF	(Uruguay) URU	Facundo Pellistri	0	0	0	0	0	0
Forwards
7	FW	(Senegal) SEN	Mamadou Sylla	0	0	0	0	0	0
9	FW	(Spain) ESP	Joselu	0	0	0	0	0	0
10	FW	(Sweden) SWE	John Guidetti	0	0	0	0	0	0
11	FW	(Spain) ESP	Luis Rioja	0	0	0	0	0	0
Players who have left the club during the season
7	FW	(Spain) ESP	Lucas Pérez	0	0	0	0	0	0
30	DF	(Mauritania) MTN	Abdallahi Mahmoud	0	0	0	0	0	0

=== Goalscorers ===
As of 27 November 2021

Rank	Player	La Liga	Copa del Rey	Total
1	(Spain) Joselu	7	0	7
2	(Spain) Víctor Laguardia	2	0	2
3	(Senegal) Mamadou Loum	1	0	1
3	(Spain) Luis Rioja	1	0	1
Own goals		0	0	0
Total		11	0	11
