= 2026 Sogndal Fotball season =

Sogndal
2026 season
- Chairman: Tor Arne Ness
- Head coach: Luís Pimenta
- Stadium: Fosshaugane Campus
- 1. divisjon: 12th
- 2026–27 Norwegian Cup: Pre-season
Home colours	Away colours

The 2026 season is the centenary season in the history of Sogndal Fotball and the ninth consecutive season in the Norwegian First Division. In addition, the club will participate in the 2026–27 Norwegian Football Cup.

On 2 December 2025, the management and the head coach Luís Pimenta agreed on the continuation of the contractual relationship until the end of 2028.

== Transfers ==
=== In ===
Pos.	Player	Transferred from	Fee	Date	Source
FW	(Finland) Onni Helén	(Finland) Turun Palloseura		15 December 2025	
DF	(Norway) Even Hovland	(Sweden) IF Brommapojkarna	Free	29 December 2025	
DF	(Norway) Mathias Øren	(Norway) Åsane	Loan return	31 December 2025	
DF	(Iceland) Atli Barkarson	(Belgium) Zulte Waregem	Undisclosed	2 February 2026	
GK	(Poland) Kacper Bieszczad	Unattached		27 March 2026	

=== Out ===
Pos.	Player	Transferred to	Fee	Date	Source
FW	(Norway) Joakim Berg Nundal	(Norway) Arendal	Undisclosed	19 December 2025	
DF	(Norway) Per-Egil Flo	Retired		1 January 2026	
DF	(Ghana) Jamal Deen Haruna	(Norway) Sandnes Ulf	Loan	12 March 2026	
FW	(Eritrea) Oliver Hintsa	(Romania) Dinamo București	Undisclosed	1 July 2026	

== Pre-season and friendlies ==
17 January 2026	Sogndal	4–0	Førde	Sogndal
				Stadium: Sognahallen

24 January 2026	Sogndal	6–5	(Sweden) Sandvikens IF	Sogndal
				Stadium: Sognahallen

5 February 2026	Sogndal	1–1	(South Korea) Daejeon Hana	Spain

12 February 2026	Sogndal	1–2	(Ukraine) Kryvbas Kryvyi Rih	Sogndalsfjøra
	51'		25'; 90+4'

21 February 2026	Sogndal	1–1	Bjarg

28 February 2026	Hødd	1–5	Sogndal

6 March 2026	Stabæk	1–0	Sogndal

21 March 2026	Sogndal	1–1	Raufoss

29 March 2026	Sogndal	1–1	Åsane

== Competitions ==
=== Overall record ===
Competition	First match	Last match	Starting round	Record							
Competition	First match	Last match	Starting round	Pld	W	D	L	GF	GA	GD	Win %
Norwegian First Division	6 April 2026		Matchday 1	10	3	3	4	17	22	−5	30.00
2026–27 Norwegian Football Cup				0	0	0	0	0	0	+0	—
Total				10	3	3	4	17	22	−5	30.00

Source: Competitions

=== Norwegian First Division ===
Pos	Team	Pld	W	D	L	GF	GA	GD	Pts
9	Sandnes Ulf	16	6	2	8	23	28	−5	20
10	Bryne	16	6	2	8	21	26	−5	20
11	Sogndal	16	5	3	8	30	41	−11	18
12	Moss	16	5	2	9	25	36	−11	17
13	Lyn	16	5	2	9	21	33	−12	17

Updated to match(es) played on 3 August 2026. Source: OBOS-ligaen (in Norwegian)
Rules for classification: 1) Points; 2) Goal difference; 3) Goals scored; 4) Head-to-head points; 5) Head-to-head goal difference; 6) Head-to-head goals scored.

==== Results summary ====
Overall								Home						Away					
Pld	W	D	L	GF	GA	GD	Pts	W	D	L	GF	GA	GD	W	D	L	GF	GA	GD
0	0	0	0	0	0	0	0	0	0	0	0	0	0	0	0	0	0	0	0

==== Results by round ====
Round	1	2	3	4	5	6	7	8	9
Ground	A	H	A	H	A	H	A	H	A
Result	L	L	L	W	D	W	D	D	L
Position									

A = Away; H = Home; W = Win; D = Draw; L = Loss

==== Matches ====
The match schedule was issued on 19 December 2025.

6 April 2026 1	Odd	4–0	Sogndal

11 April 2026 2	Sogndal	0–3	Lyn

18 April 2026 3	Strømsgodset	3–0	Sogndal

25 April 2026 4	Sogndal	2–0	Åsane

1 May 2026 5	Bryne	3–3	Sogndal

10 May 2026 6	Sogndal	5–1	Haugesund

16 May 2026 7	Hødd	2–2	Sogndal

20 May 2026 8	Sogndal	2–2	Stabæk

25 May 2026 9	Sandnes Ulf	2–0	Sogndal

14 June 2026 11	Sogndal	2–4	Moss	Sogndalsfjøra
16:00				Stadium: Fosshaugane Campus

=== Norwegian Football Cup ===
22–23 August 2026 First round	Fjøra	v	Sogndal
