= Gleb Gurban =

Belarusian footballer

Personal information
- Full name: Gleb Vitalyevich Gurban
- Date of birth: 15 May 2001 (age 25)
- Place of birth: Minsk, Belarus
- Height: 1.77 m (5 ft 10 in)
- Position: Defender

Team information
- Current team: Dinamo Minsk
- Number: 44

Youth career
- 2012–2018: Minsk

Senior career*
Years	Team	Apps	(Gls)
2019–2020	Minsk	3	(0)
2020	→ Smolevichi (loan)	4	(0)
2021	Rukh Brest	0	(0)
2021	→ Orsha (loan)	14	(1)
2022–2024	Minsk	57	(1)
2024–2026	SKA-Khabarovsk	42	(0)
2026–	Dinamo Minsk	1	(0)

International career
2018	Belarus U19		
- * Club domestic league appearances and goals as of 4 July 2026

Gleb Vitalyevich Gurban (Belarusian: Глеб Віталевіч Гурбан; Russian: Глеб Витальевич Гурбан; born 15 May 2001) is a Belarusian footballer who plays for Dinamo Minsk.
