= Aleksandar Todorov (footballer) =

Bulgarian football player (born 2001)

Personal information
- Full name: Aleksandar Todorov Todorov
- Date of birth: 25 June 2001 (age 25)
- Place of birth: Sofia, Bulgaria
- Height: 1.73 m (5 ft 8 in)
- Position: Midfielder

Team information
- Current team: Cherno More
- Number: 14

Youth career
- Septemvri Sofia

Senior career*
| Years | Team | Apps | (Gls) |
| 2019–2023 | Septemvri Sofia | 81 | (4) |
| 2023–2026 | Montana | 94 | (6) |
| 2026– | Cherno More | 3 | (0) |

International career
| 2018–2019 | Bulgaria U18 | 3 | (0) |
| 2019–2020 | Bulgaria U19 | 9 | (1) |
- * Club domestic league appearances and goals as of 13 October 2026

Aleksandar Todorov (Bulgarian: Александър Тодоров; born 25 June 2001) is a Bulgarian professional footballer who plays as a midfielder for First League club Cherno More Varna.

== Career ==
Todorov began his career in the local Septemvri Sofia academy. In 2019 he was called up for the first team. He complete his professional debut in the first league match of the season against Ludogorets Razgrad.

On 17 June 2026, Todorov signed a contract with Cherno More Varna.

== International career ==
in August 2019 he received his first call up for Bulgaria U19 for the friendly matches against North Macedonia U19.

== Career statistics ==
=== Club ===
As of 1 June 2026

| Club performance | | | League | | Cup | | Continental | | Other | | Total | |
| Club | League | Season | Apps | Goals | Apps | Goals | Apps | Goals | Apps | Goals | Apps | Goals |
| Bulgaria | | | League | | Bulgarian Cup | | Europe | | Other (Note: Includes Promotion/relegation play-off matches.) | | Total | |
|---|---|---|---|---|---|---|---|---|---|---|---|---|
| Septemvri Sofia | Second League | 2019–20 | 4 | 0 | 2 | 0 | – | | – | | 6 | 0 |
| Septemvri Sofia | Second League | 2020–21 | 27 | 0 | 1 | 0 | – | | 1 | 0 | 29 | 0 |
| Septemvri Sofia | Second League | 2021–22 | 31 | 4 | 1 | 0 | – | | – | | 32 | 4 |
| Septemvri Sofia | First League | 2022–23 | 19 | 0 | 1 | 0 | – | | – | | 20 | 0 |
| Septemvri Sofia | Total | | 81 | 4 | 5 | 0 | 0 | 0 | 1 | 0 | 87 | 4 |
| Montana | Second League | 2023–24 | 30 | 2 | 1 | 0 | – | | – | | 31 | 2 |
| Montana | Second League | 2024–25 | 37 | 3 | 2 | 0 | – | | – | | 39 | 3 |
| Montana | First League | 2025–26 | 27 | 1 | 1 | 0 | – | | – | | 28 | 1 |
| Montana | Total | | 94 | 6 | 4 | 0 | 0 | 0 | 0 | 0 | 98 | 6 |
| Career statistics | | | 175 | 10 | 9 | 0 | 0 | 0 | 0 | 0 | 184 | 10 |
