= Filip Firbacher =

Czech national football player, forward

Personal information
- Full name: Filip Firbacher
- Date of birth: 21 December 2001 (age 24)
- Place of birth: Czech Republic
- Height: 1.82 m (6 ft 0 in)
- Position: Forward

Team information
- Current team: Považská Bystrica (on loan from Hradec Králové)
- Number: 9

Youth career
- Hradec Králové

Senior career*
Years	Team	Apps	(Gls)
2018–2024	Hradec Králové	25	(2)
2020–2021	→ Vlašim (loan)	24	(4)
2022–2023	→ Chrudim (loan)	41	(13)
2023–2024	→ Varnsdorf (loan)	13	(7)
2024	Karkonosze Jelenia Góra	5	(0)
2024	Varnsdorf	5	(0)
2025–	Hradec Králové	0	(0)
2025	→ Varnsdorf (loan)	16	(3)
2025	→ Dynamo České Budějovice (loan)	9	(2)
2026–	→ Považská Bystrica (loan)	13	(0)

International career
2016	Czech Republic U15	2	(0)
2016–2017	Czech Republic U16	10	(2)
2017–2018	Czech Republic U17	11	(2)
2018–2019	Czech Republic U18	18	(10)
2019–2020	Czech Republic U18	11	(5)
2022	Czech Republic U20	2	(1)
- * Club domestic league appearances and goals as of 25 May 2026

Filip Firbacher (born 21 December 2001) is a Czech professional footballer who plays as forward for 2. Liga club Považská Bystrica on loan from Hradec Králové.

In 2018, The Guardian named Firbacher in a list of the 60 top football talents born in the year 2001. At the time, Firbacher was playing for Hradec Králové's under-19 team.

In January 2024, Firbacher was punished with a 30-month ban in the Czech football for match-fixing, later reduced to 18 months following an appeal.

On 29 February 2024, he moved to Polish III liga club Karkonosze Jelenia Góra, signing a deal until the end of the season. On 6 May 2024, the FIFA Disciplinary Committee expanded Firbacher's ban across all of its member associations, and he left Karkonosze the following day.

He returned to playing in October 2024 with Varnsdorf after having the rest of his suspension waived by the Czech FA's Ethics Committee.

On 20 June 2025, Firbacher joined Czech National Football League club Dynamo České Budějovice on a half-year loan deal with option to buy.

In February 2026, Firbacher joined 2. Liga club Považská Bystrica on a half-year loan deal.
