= Yevgeny Kozel =

Belarusian professional footballer

Personal information
- Full name: Yevgeny Sergeyevich Kozel
- Date of birth: 22 February 2001 (age 25)
- Place of birth: Stolin, Brest Oblast, Belarus
- Height: 1.93 m (6 ft 4 in)
- Position: Forward

Team information
- Current team: Baranovichi
- Number: 91

Youth career
- 2014–2019: Shakhtyor Soligorsk

Senior career*
Years	Team	Apps	(Gls)
2020–2022	Shakhtyor Soligorsk	1	(0)
2020	→ Tukums 2000 (loan)	0	(0)
2020	→ Gorodeya (loan)	6	(0)
2021	→ Sputnik Rechitsa (loan)	13	(2)
2022	→ Dinamo Brest (loan)	11	(0)
2022	→ Shakhtyor Petrikov (loan)	6	(0)
2023	Baranovichi	15	(5)
2024	Volna Pinsk	9	(1)
2024–	Baranovichi	13	(1)

International career
2019	Belarus U19	3	(1)
- * Club domestic league appearances and goals as of 10 December 2024

Yevgeny Sergeyevich Kozel (Belarusian: Яўген Сяргеевіч Козел; Russian: Евгений Сергеевич Козел; born 22 February 2001) is a Belarusian professional footballer who plays for Baranovichi.

== Honors ==
Shakhtyor Soligorsk

- Belarusian Premier League: 2021
