= Keenan Patten =

Welsh footballer

Personal information
- Full name: Keenan Ieuan Patten
- Date of birth: 7 April 2001 (age 25)
- Place of birth: Cardiff, Wales
- Height: 1.86 m (6 ft 1 in)
- Position: Midfielder

Team information
- Current team: Newport County
- Number: 29

Youth career
- –2022: Cardiff City

Senior career*
Years	Team	Apps	(Gls)
2019–2022	Cardiff City	0	(0)
2019–2020	→ Penybont (loan)	2	(1)
2021–2022	→ Hereford (loan)	15	(0)
2022–2023	AFC Fylde	8	(0)
2023–2025	Barry Town United	43	(8)
2025–	Newport County	7	(0)
2026	→ Barry Town United	7	(0)

International career^{‡}
2018	Wales U17	2	(0)
2019–2020	Wales U19	4	(1)
- * Club domestic league appearances and goals as of 22:28, 23 August 2026 (UTC) ‡ National team caps and goals as of 20:17, 2 February 2026 (UTC)

Keenan Ieuan Patten (born 7 April 2001) is a Welsh footballer who plays as a midfielder for EFL League Two club Newport County. He is a former Wales under 19 international.

== Career ==
=== Cardiff City ===
Patten joined the Cardiff City academy aged nine, progressing through the ranks to sign a scholarship in February 2017. In March 2021, he signed a new one-year deal. He departed the club at the end of the 2021–22 season.

=== AFC Fylde ===
In August 2022, Patten joined National League North side AFC Fylde on an initial one-year deal with the option to extend.

=== Newport County ===
On 4 February 2025, Patten joined League Two club Newport County on an eighteen-month deal for an undisclosed fee. On 8 February 2025, he made his debut in a 3–0 victory over Crewe Alexandra. In July 2025, he suffered a broken leg during a pre-season friendly against Bristol City, needing to undergo surgery. On 2 February 2026 Patten joined Cymru Premier club Barry Town United on loan for the remainder of the 2025-26 season. In June 2026 Patten agreed a new short term contract with Newport.
