= Damjan Dostanić =

Serbian footballer (born 2001)

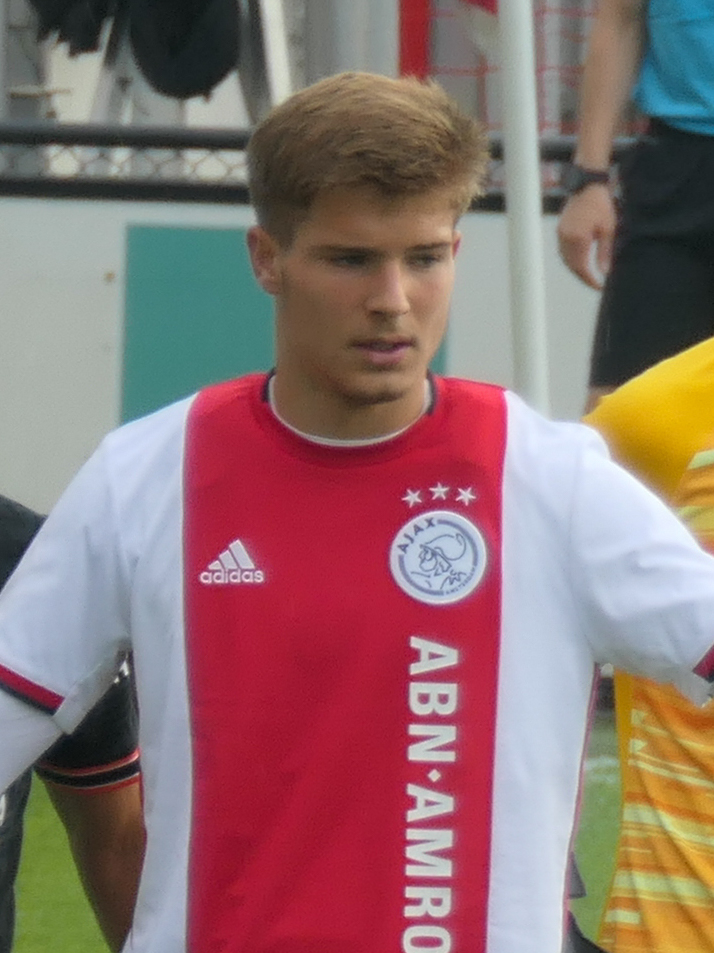
- Dostanić with Jong Ajax in 2019

Personal information
- Date of birth: 3 December 2001 (age 24)
- Place of birth: Rotterdam, Netherlands
- Height: 1.85 m (6 ft 1 in)
- Position: Forward

Youth career
- –2011: VVOR
- 2011–2018: Excelsior
- 2018–2020: Ajax

Senior career*
Years	Team	Apps	(Gls)
2018–2019	Jong Ajax	2	(1)
2020–2022	TSC Bačka Topola	6	(1)
2021–2022	→ Žarkovo (loan)	29	(7)
2022–2023	BATE Borisov	10	(0)

International career^{‡}
2019	Serbia U19	3	(2)
- * Club domestic league appearances and goals as of 31 December 2023 ‡ National team caps and goals as of 14 October 2019

Damjan Dostanić (Serbian Cyrillic: Дамјан Достанић; born 3 December 2001) is a professional footballer who plays as forward. Born in the Netherlands, he has represented Serbia at under-19 level.
