= Sergi Rosanas =

Spanish footballer

Personal information
- Full name: Sergi Rosanas Moragas
- Date of birth: 29 January 2002 (age 24)
- Place of birth: Cabrera de Mar, Spain
- Height: 1.72 m (5 ft 8 in)
- Position: Right-back

Youth career
- 2009–2021: Barcelona

Senior career*
Years	Team	Apps	(Gls)
2021–2023	Barcelona B	6	(0)
2023–2025	Sparta Rotterdam	2	(0)
2023–2025	Sparta Rotterdam II	5	(1)

International career
2018	Spain U-17	1	(0)
2020	Spain U-19	3	(1)
- * Club domestic league appearances and goals as of 18:22, 31 December 2025 (UTC)

Sergi Rosanas Moragas (born 29 January 2002) is a Spanish professional football player who plays as a right-back.

== Club career ==
=== Barcelona ===
Born in Cabrera de Mar, Barcelona, Catalonia, Rosanas joined the academy at FC Barcelona in 2009 having previously played at local club Vilassar de Mar. Rosanas made his debut for FC Barcelona Atlètic against UE Olot, on 24 January 2021. Unfortunately, he suffered an Anterior cruciate ligament injury on his debut. It was a particular blow for Rosanas as he had missed the start of the season with a dislocated shoulder and only just worked himself back into fitness.

In October 2022, along with Antonio Aranda, Emre Demir and Fabio Blanco Gómez, he was called into involvement with the first team squad training by first team Barcelona manager Xavi. He was released by the club at the culmination of his contract on 30 June 2023.

=== Sparta Rotterdam ===
In June 2023, Rosanas was announced to be joining Eredivisie side Sparta Rotterdam, agreeing to a two-year contract with the option for another two. On 3 January 2025, Rosanas was released from his contract by mutual consent.

== International career ==
A youth international for Spain, Rosanas scored for the Spain U19s in a 4-0 win over Serbia U-19 in October 2019.

== Career statistics ==
As of match played 19 May 2024

Appearances and goals by club, season and competition
Club	Season	League			National cup		Europe		Other		Total	
Club	Season	Division	Apps	Goals	Apps	Goals	Apps	Goals	Apps	Goals	Apps	Goals
Barcelona B	2020–21	Segunda División B	1	0	—		—		—		1	0
Barcelona B	2022–23	Primera Federación	5	0	—		—		—		5	0
Barcelona B	Total		6	0	—		—		—		6	0
Sparta Rotterdam	2023–24	Eredivisie	3	0	1	0	—		—		4	0
Jong Sparta Rotterdam	2023–24	Tweede Divisie	5	0	—		—		—		5	0
Career total			14	0	1	0	0	0	0	0	15	0

== Personal life ==
In his spare time during the COVID-19 pandemic Rosanas started university studies online in advertising, PR and marketing.
