= Angelo Ndrecka =

Albanian footballer (born 2001)

Personal information
- Date of birth: 24 September 2001 (age 25)
- Place of birth: Desenzano del Garda, Italy
- Height: 1.72 m (5 ft 8 in)
- Position: Left-back

Team information
- Current team: Cittadella

Youth career
- –2019: Chievo
- 2019–2021: Lazio

Senior career*
Years	Team	Apps	(Gls)
2019	Chievo	1	(0)
2019–2022	Lazio	0	(0)
2021–2022	→ Teramo (loan)	13	(0)
2022–2024	Pro Patria	70	(1)
2024–2025	Virtus Entella	15	(0)
2025–2026	Ternana	35	(1)
2026–	Cittadella	0	(0)

International career^{‡}
2018	Albania U19	2	(1)
2019–2022	Albania U21	12	(0)
- * Club domestic league appearances and goals as of 30 April 2026 ‡ National team caps and goals as of 29 March 2022

Angelo Ndrecka (born 24 September 2001) is a professional footballer who plays as a left-back for Serie C Group A club Cittadella. Born in Italy, he represents Albania internationally.

== Club career ==
Ndrecka made his professional debut for Chievo in a 4–0 Serie A loss to SPAL on 4 May 2019.

On 17 July 2019, Ndrecka signed with a deal with Lazio. He was assigned to their Under-19 squad.

On 31 August 2021 he joined Teramo on loan.

On 13 July 2022 he joined Pro Patria on permanent basis.

On 18 July 2024, Ndrecka signed with Virtus Entella.

== International career ==
Ndrecka was born in Italy to Albanian parents from Kavajë. Ndrecka represented the Albania U19s in a friendly in November 2018.
