= Rok Maher =

Slovenian footballer (born 2001)

Personal information
- Date of birth: 20 July 2001 (age 25)
- Place of birth: Slovenj Gradec, Slovenia
- Height: 1.84 m (6 ft 0 in)
- Position: Midfielder

Team information
- Current team: Brinje Grosuplje
- Number: 18

Youth career
- Dravograd
- 2015–2019: Maribor

Senior career*
| Years | Team | Apps | (Gls) |
| 2019–2023 | Maribor | 5 | (0) |
| 2020–2021 | → Bravo (loan) | 22 | (1) |
| 2022–2023 | → Bistrica (loan) | 22 | (3) |
| 2023–2024 | Bravo | 25 | (2) |
| 2024–2026 | Aluminij | 41 | (1) |
| 2025 | → Brinje Grosuplje (loan) | 11 | (2) |
| 2026– | Brinje Grosuplje | 3 | (0) |

International career
| 2016 | Slovenia U15 | 4 | (1) |
| 2016–2017 | Slovenia U16 | 6 | (0) |
| 2017–2018 | Slovenia U17 | 19 | (0) |
| 2018–2019 | Slovenia U18 | 3 | (2) |
| 2018–2020 | Slovenia U19 | 25 | (2) |
| 2021 | Slovenia U21 | 1 | (0) |
- * Club domestic league appearances and goals as of 3 August 2026

Rok Maher (born 20 July 2001) is a Slovenian footballer who plays as a midfielder for Brinje Grosuplje.
