= Pavel Pashevich =

Belarusian footballer (born 2001)

Personal information
- Date of birth: 4 June 2001 (age 25)
- Place of birth: Borisov, Minsk Oblast, Belarus
- Height: 1.80 m (5 ft 11 in)
- Position: Defender

Team information
- Current team: Gomel
- Number: 14

Youth career
- 2015–2020: BATE Borisov

Senior career*
Years	Team	Apps	(Gls)
2018–2025	BATE Borisov	34	(0)
2020	→ Gorodeya (loan)	2	(0)
2021	→ Gomel (loan)	3	(0)
2021	→ Arsenal Dzerzhinsk (loan)	18	(0)
2022–2023	→ Energetik-BGU Minsk (loan)	54	(2)
2025	→ BATE-2 Borisov	2	(0)
2026–	Gomel	14	(0)

International career^{‡}
2019	Belarus U19	3	(1)
2022	Belarus U21	2	(0)
- * Club domestic league appearances and goals as of 6 July 2026 ‡ National team caps and goals as of 8 June 2022

Pavel Pashevich (Belarusian: Павал Пашэвіч; Russian: Павел Пашевич; born 4 June 2001) is a Belarusian professional footballer who plays for Gomel.

== Honours ==
Arsenal Dzerzhinsk

- Belarusian First League winner: 2021
