= Igor Shkolik =

Russian footballer

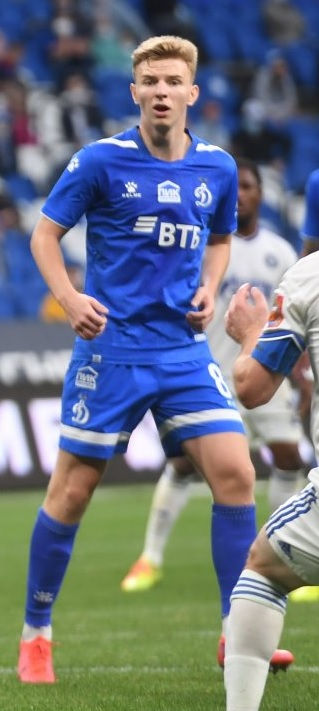
- Shkolik with Dynamo Moscow in 2020

Personal information
- Full name: Igor Anatolyevich Shkolik
- Date of birth: 9 January 2001 (age 25)
- Place of birth: Arkhangelsk, Russia
- Height: 1.78 m (5 ft 10 in)
- Position: Midfielder

Team information
- Current team: SKA-Khabarovsk
- Number: 20

Youth career
- –2014: Zenit Saint Petersburg
- 2014–2020: Dynamo Moscow

Senior career*
Years	Team	Apps	(Gls)
2020–2023	Dynamo Moscow	7	(0)
2020–2021	→ Dynamo-2 Moscow	14	(1)
2021–2022	→ Rotor Volgograd (loan)	32	(4)
2022–2023	→ Neftekhimik Nizhnekamsk (loan)	21	(1)
2023	→ Dynamo-2 Moscow	17	(0)
2024	Dinamo Minsk	21	(1)
2025	Iraklis	9	(1)
2025–2026	Leningradets Leningrad Oblast	23	(5)
2026–	SKA-Khabarovsk	0	(0)

International career^{‡}
2016–2017	Russia U16	11	(1)
2017–2018	Russia U17	10	(1)
2019	Russia U18	8	(2)
2019–2020	Russia U19	5	(2)
- * Club domestic league appearances and goals as of 13 June 2026 ‡ National team caps and goals as of 11 February 2020

Igor Anatolyevich Shkolik (Russian: Игорь Анатольевич Школик; born 9 January 2001) is a Russian football player who plays as a central midfielder for SKA-Khabarovsk.

== Biography ==
Igor Shkolik was born in Arkhangelsk but moved to Saint Petersburg at the age of seven, where he began playing football at the Lokomotiv Youth Sports School. After an impressive performance in one of the city's tournaments, he was invited to join the FC Zenit Academy, where he spent nearly five years.

In 2014, he transferred to the FC Dynamo Moscow Academy. His first coach at Dynamo, Vadim Garanin, transitioned Igor from a forward to a central midfielder. He made his debut for the FC Dynamo youth team in July 2018 and was later named Moscow's best footballer in his age group.

In the winters of 2019 and 2020, he participated in training camps with the FC Dynamo Moscow senior team but continued to gain match experience with the reserve squad. During the 2019/20 season, he became a champion of the Russian Youth League, scoring 7 goals in 21 matches.

== Club career ==
He made his debut in the Russian Premier League for FC Dynamo Moscow on 16 July 2020 in a game against FC Ufa, substituting Oscar Hiljemark at half-time. He made his first starting lineup appearance on 19 July 2020 in a game against FC Krasnodar.

On 18 June 2021, he joined FC Rotor Volgograd on loan. On 8 July 2022, Shkolik was loaned to FC Neftekhimik Nizhnekamsk.

On 16 February 2024, Shkolik signed with FC Dinamo Minsk in Belarus.

On 24 January 2025 Greek club Iraklis F.C. announced the signing of Shkolik.

== Career statistics ==
As of 18 May 2021

Club	Season	League			Cup		Continental		Total	
Club	Season	Division	Apps	Goals	Apps	Goals	Apps	Goals	Apps	Goals
FC Dynamo Moscow	2019–20	Premier League	3	0	0	0	–		3	0
FC Dynamo Moscow	2020–21	Premier League	4	0	0	0	0	0	4	0
FC Dynamo Moscow	Total		7	0	0	0	0	0	7	0
FC Dynamo-2 Moscow	2020–21	PFL	14	1	–		–		14	1
Career total			21	1	0	0	0	0	21	1
