= Marc Tenas =

Spanish footballer (born 2001)

Personal information
- Full name: Marc Tenas Ureña
- Date of birth: 30 May 2001 (age 25)
- Place of birth: Vic, Spain
- Height: 1.83 m (6 ft 0 in)
- Position: Forward

Team information
- Current team: Gimnástica Segoviana
- Number: 9

Youth career
- 2005–2010: Vic Riuprimer
- 2010–2011: Barcelona
- 2011–2013: Vic Riuprimer
- 2013–2016: Cornellà
- 2016–2019: Atlético Madrid

Senior career*
Years	Team	Apps	(Gls)
2019–2021	Atlético Madrid B	13	(1)
2021–2023	Alavés B	71	(16)
2022–2023	Alavés	4	(0)
2023–2025	Cornellà	35	(0)
2025–	Gimnástica Segoviana	23	(3)

International career
2019	Spain U18	4	(2)
2019–2020	Spain U19	6	(1)
2019	Spain U20	5	(2)
- * Club domestic league appearances and goals as of 24 February 2026

Marc Tenas Ureña (born 30 May 2001) is a Spanish professional footballer who plays as a forward for Segunda Federación club Gimnástica Segoviana.

== Club career ==
Born in Vic, Barcelona, Catalonia, Tenas began playing football with his local club Vic Riuprimer, before joining the youth academies of Barcelona, Cornellà and finally Atlético Madrid in 2016. He began his senior career with Atlético Madrid B in 2019. Tenas transferred to Alavés on 2 September 2021, initially joining as part of their reserves. He made his La Liga and professional debut with Alavés in a 2–1 win over Espanyol on 11 May 2022, coming on as a substitute in the 76th minute.

== International career ==
Tenas is a youth international for Spain, having represented the Spain U18s, U19s, and U20s.

== Personal life ==
Tenas was born into a family of footballers, as his grandfather, and father were both football goalkeepers. His twin brother, Arnau, is a professional football goalkeeper currently at Villarreal.
