= Atli Barkarson =

Icelandic footballer

Personal information
- Date of birth: 19 March 2001 (age 25)
- Place of birth: Akureyri, Iceland
- Height: 1.88 m (6 ft 2 in)
- Position: Left-back

Team information
- Current team: Sogndal
- Number: 23

Youth career
- 2012–2016: Völsungur
- 2017–2019: Norwich City

Senior career*
Years	Team	Apps	(Gls)
2017	Völsungur	7	(2)
2019	Fredrikstad	3	(0)
2020–2021	Víkingur Reykjavík	36	(1)
2022–2024	SønderjyskE	54	(2)
2024–2026	Zulte Waregem	20	(1)
2026–	Sogndal	21	(1)

International career^{‡}
2017	Iceland U16	7	(3)
2017–2018	Iceland U17	8	(0)
2017	Iceland U18	4	(0)
2018–2019	Iceland U19	10	(1)
2021–2022	Iceland U21	7	(2)
2022–2023	Iceland	4	(0)
- * Club domestic league appearances and goals as of 14 November 2026 ‡ National team caps and goals as of 7 January 2025

Atli Barkarson (born 19 March 2001) is an Icelandic professional footballer who plays as a left-back for Norwegian First Division club Sogndal, and the Iceland national team.

== Club career ==
Atli joined the youth academy of Völsungur in 2012 and was promoted to the first team in 2017. He made seven appearances and scored two goals in the 2. deild karla that season.

On 2 September 2017, Atli joined the youth team of Norwich City of the English Championship. After playing for the club's under-18 team for the first year, he signed his first professional contract on 30 June 2018. In August 2019, Atli left the club to join Fredrikstad FK of the Norwegian First Division. During his short stint with the club, he made three league appearances.

In 2020, Atli returned to Iceland and signed for Víkingur Reykjavík of the Úrvalsdeild. He appeared in the team's single 2020–21 UEFA Europa League match, a 1–2 elimination defeat to NK Olimpija Ljubljana of the Slovenia PrivaLiga.

On 27 January 2022, it was confirmed that Atli had joined Danish Superliga club SønderjyskE on a deal until 30th of June 2026. On August 19, 2024, Belgian Challenger Pro League club Zulte Waregem confirmed that they had signed Barkarson on a deal until 30th of June 2026.

On 2 February 2026, Atli joined Norwegian First Division side Sogndal Fotball on a contract until 2028.

== International career ==
Atli was called up to the senior national team for a friendlies against Uganda and South Korea in January 2022. He made his senior international debut as a starter in the first match, an eventual 1–1 draw, on 12 January 2022.

=== International career statistics ===
As of match played 10 June 2022.

Iceland national team
Year	Apps	Goals
2022	4	0
Total	4	0
