= Bartosz Bida =

Polish footballer

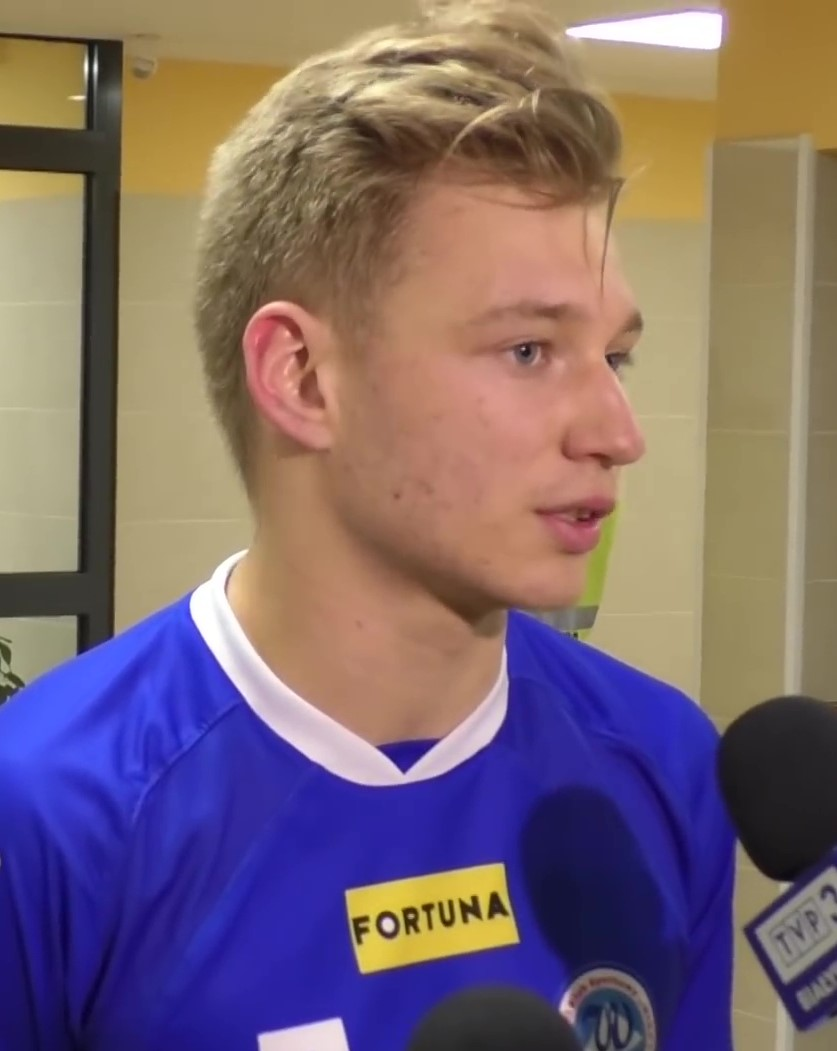
- Bida in 2019

Personal information
- Full name: Bartosz Bida
- Date of birth: 21 February 2001 (age 25)
- Place of birth: Rzeszów, Poland
- Height: 1.75 m (5 ft 9 in)
- Position: Forward

Team information
- Current team: Unia Skierniewice
- Number: 11

Youth career
- –2015: Stal Rzeszów
- 2015–2017: Jagiellonia Białystok

Senior career*
Years	Team	Apps	(Gls)
2017–2023	Jagiellonia Białystok	74	(10)
2018–2019	→ Wigry Suwałki (loan)	10	(5)
2020–2023	Jagiellonia II	13	(4)
2023–2024	Podbeskidzie	30	(6)
2024–2025	Miedź Legnica	11	(0)
2025	→ Stal Stalowa Wola (loan)	8	(0)
2025–2026	Miedź Legnica II	15	(1)
2026–	Unia Skierniewice	14	(9)

International career
2017	Poland U16	5	(3)
2017–2018	Poland U17	8	(3)
2019	Poland U18	3	(1)
2019	Poland U19	3	(1)
2019–2020	Poland U21	5	(1)
- * Club domestic league appearances and goals as of 09:25, 31 May 2026 (UTC)

Bartosz Bida (born 21 February 2001) is a Polish professional footballer who plays as a forward for I liga club Unia Skierniewice.

== Honours ==
Miedź Legnica II

- Lower Silesia Super Cup: 2025

Unia Skierniewice

- II liga: 2025–26
