= 2023–24 Real Sociedad season =

Real Sociedad
2023–24 season
- President: Jokin Aperribay
- Head coach: Imanol Alguacil
- Stadium: Reale Arena
- La Liga: 6th
- Copa del Rey: Semi-finals
- UEFA Champions League: Round of 16
- Top goalscorer: League: Mikel Oyarzabal (9); All: Mikel Oyarzabal (14)
- Highest home attendance: 39,336 vs Paris Saint-Germain
- Lowest home attendance: 25,335 vs Granada
| Home colours | Away colours | Third colours |

The 2023–24 season was Real Sociedad's 114th season in existence and 14th consecutive season in La Liga. They also competed in the Copa del Rey and the UEFA Champions League, returning to the top European club tournament after a nine-year absence.

This was the club's first season since 2014–15 without Asier Illarramendi, who departed to join American club FC Dallas.

== Players ==
=== First-team squad ===
As of 19 January 2024

Note: Flags indicate national team as defined under FIFA eligibility rules; some limited exceptions apply. Players may hold more than one non-FIFA nationality.

| No. | Pos. | Nation | Player |
|---|---|---|---|
| 1 | GK | ESP | Álex Remiro |
| 2 | DF | ESP | Álvaro Odriozola |
| 3 | DF | ESP | Aihen Muñoz |
| 4 | MF | ESP | Martín Zubimendi |
| 5 | DF | ESP | Igor Zubeldia |
| 6 | DF | ESP | Aritz Elustondo (vice-captain) |
| 7 | FW | ESP | Ander Barrenetxea |
| 8 | MF | ESP | Mikel Merino (3rd captain) |
| 9 | FW | ESP | Carlos Fernández |
| 10 | FW | ESP | Mikel Oyarzabal (captain) |
| 11 | FW | SUR | Sheraldo Becker |
| 12 | MF | RUS | Arsen Zakharyan |

| No. | Pos. | Nation | Player |
|---|---|---|---|
| 13 | GK | ESP | Unai Marrero |
| 14 | FW | JPN | Takefusa Kubo |
| 15 | MF | ESP | Urko González de Zárate |
| 16 | MF | ESP | Jon Ander Olasagasti |
| 17 | DF | SCO | Kieran Tierney (on loan from Arsenal) |
| 18 | DF | MLI | Hamari Traoré |
| 19 | FW | NGR | Umar Sadiq |
| 20 | DF | ESP | Jon Pacheco |
| 21 | FW | POR | André Silva (on loan from RB Leipzig) |
| 22 | MF | ESP | Beñat Turrientes |
| 23 | MF | ESP | Brais Méndez |
| 24 | DF | ESP | Robin Le Normand |

=== Reserve team ===
Note: Flags indicate national team as defined under FIFA eligibility rules; some limited exceptions apply. Players may hold more than one non-FIFA nationality.

| No. | Pos. | Nation | Player |
|---|---|---|---|
| 28 | MF | ESP | Jon Magunazelaia |
| 29 | MF | ESP | Pablo Marín |
| 30 | GK | ESP | Gaizka Ayesa |
| 36 | DF | ESP | Jon Martín |

| No. | Pos. | Nation | Player |
|---|---|---|---|
| 37 | GK | ESP | Aitor Fraga |
| 38 | MF | ESP | Alberto Dadie |
| 39 | DF | VEN | Jon Aramburu |
| 40 | FW | NOR | Bryan Fiabema |

=== Other players under contract ===
Note: Flags indicate national team as defined under FIFA eligibility rules; some limited exceptions apply. Players may hold more than one non-FIFA nationality.

| No. | Pos. | Nation | Player |
|---|---|---|---|
| — | MF | ESP | Martín Merquelanz |

=== Out on loan ===
Note: Flags indicate national team as defined under FIFA eligibility rules; some limited exceptions apply. Players may hold more than one non-FIFA nationality.

| No. | Pos. | Nation | Player |
|---|---|---|---|
| — | DF | ESP | Álex Sola (at Alavés until 30 June 2024) |
| — | DF | ESP | Diego Rico (at Getafe until 30 June 2024) |
| — | DF | USA | Jonathan Gómez (at Mirandés until 30 June 2024) |

| No. | Pos. | Nation | Player |
|---|---|---|---|
| — | MF | ESP | Robert Navarro (at Cádiz until 30 June 2024) |
| — | MF | ESP | Roberto López (at Tenerife until 30 June 2024) |
| — | FW | ESP | Jon Karrikaburu (at Andorra until 30 June 2024) |

== Transfers ==
=== In ===
| Pos. | Player | Transferred from | Fee | Date | Source |
|---|---|---|---|---|---|
| DF | (Mali) Hamari Traoré | (France) Rennes | Free | 1 July 2023 | |
| FW | (Portugal) André Silva | (Germany) RB Leipzig | Loan | 2 August 2023 | |
| MF | (Russia) Arsen Zakharyan | (Russia) Dynamo Moscow | €13,000,000 | 19 August 2023 | |
| DF | (Scotland) Kieran Tierney | (England) Arsenal | Loan | 28 August 2023 | |
| DF | (Spain) Álvaro Odriozola | (Spain) Real Madrid | €3,000,000 | 1 September 2023 | |
| FW | (Suriname) Sheraldo Becker | (Germany) Union Berlin | €3,000,000 | 18 January 2024 | |
| DF | (Spain) Javi Galán | (Spain) Atlético Madrid | Loan | 24 January 2024 | |

=== Out ===
| Pos. | Player | Transferred to | Fee | Date | Source |
|---|---|---|---|---|---|
| MF | (Spain) Asier Illarramendi | (United States) FC Dallas | Free | 1 July 2023 | |
| DF | (France) Modibo Sagnan | (Netherlands) Utrecht | €2,900,000 | 1 July 2023 | |
| MF | (Spain) Portu | (Spain) Getafe | €3,500,000 | 1 July 2023 | |
| DF | (Spain) Aritz Arambarri | (Spain) Leganés | Free | 1 July 2023 | |
| MF | (Spain) Roberto López | (Spain) Tenerife | Loan | 1 July 2023 | |
| MF | (Spain) Ander Guevara | (Spain) Alavés | €1,800,000 | 9 July 2023 | |
| MF | (Spain) David Silva | Retired | | 28 July 2023 | |
| DF | (Spain) Andoni Gorosabel | (Spain) Alavés | Undisclosed | 11 August 2023 | |
| FW | (Spain) Jon Karrikaburu | (Spain) Alavés | Loan | 1 September 2023 | |
| MF | (Spain) Robert Navarro | (Spain) Cádiz | Loan | 1 September 2023 | |
| DF | (Spain) Álex Sola | (Spain) Alavés | Loan | 1 September 2023 | |
| DF | (Spain) Diego Rico | (Spain) Getafe | Loan | 1 September 2023 | |
| FW | (Spain) Jon Karrikaburu | (Spain) Andorra | Loan | 7 January 2024 | |
| FW | (France) Mohamed-Ali Cho | (France) Nice | €12,000,000 | 8 January 2024 | |

=== New contracts ===
| Position | Player | Until | Ref. |
|---|---|---|---|
| MF | (Spain) Igor Zubeldia | June 2029 | |
| FW | (Spain) Ander Barrenetxea | June 2030 | |
| FW | (Japan) Takefusa Kubo | June 2029 | |

== Pre-season and friendlies ==
Win Draw Loss

| 21 July 2023 Euskal Herriko Futbol Txapelketa | Real Sociedad (Spain) | 1–3 | (Spain) Osasuna | Irun |
| 20:45 CEST (UTC+2) | Cho 24'; Zubeldia (yellow card) 27' | Report | Catena 9', 38', 43' | Stadium: Stadium Gal; Referee: Ricardo de Burgos Bengoetxea |

| 25 July 2023 Friendly | Sporting CP (Portugal) | 3–0 | (Spain) Real Sociedad | Faro/Loulé, Portugal |
| 22:30 WEST (UTC+1) | Gyökeres 19'; Esgaio 28'; Gonçalves 55'; Barroso (red card) 84' | Report | | Stadium: Estádio do Algarve; Referee: Gonçalo Neves (Portugal) |

| 29 July 2023 Friendly | Real Sociedad (Spain) | 1–0 | (Germany) Bayer Leverkusen | San Sebastián |
| 19:00 CEST (UTC+2) | Méndez 42' | Report | Puerta (yellow card) 37'; Marsenic (yellow card) 90+1' | Stadium: Reale Arena; Attendance: 17,143; Referee: Igor Galech Apezteguía (Spain) |

| 2 August 2023 La Liga Summer Tour | Atlético Madrid (Spain) | 0–0 | (Spain) Real Sociedad | Guadalupe, Mexico |
| 19:00 CDT (UTC−5) | Hermoso (yellow card) 33'; Depay (penalty missed) 79' | Report | Zubeldia (yellow card) 14'; Le Normand (yellow card) 33'; Pacheco (yellow card) 54' | Stadium: Estadio BBVA; Attendance: 33,055; Referee: Fernando Hernández Gómez (Mexico) |

| 5 August 2023 La Liga Summer Tour | Real Betis (Spain) | 0–1 | (Spain) Real Sociedad | San Francisco, United States |
| 20:00 PDT (UTC−7) | Miranda (yellow card) 35'; Guardado (yellow card) 45'; Roca (yellow card) 63' | | Muñoz 69'; Oyarzabal (yellow card) 89' | Stadium: Oracle Park |

| 29 May 2024 Friendly | Tokyo Verdy (Japan) | 0–2 | (Spain) Real Sociedad | Tokyo, Japan |
| 19:30 JST (UTC+9) | | Report | González 45'; Zakharyan 90+1' | Stadium: Japan National Stadium; Attendance: 40,050; Referee: Shu Kawamata |

== Competitions ==
=== Overall record ===
| Competition | First match | Last match | Starting round | Final position | Record | | | | | | | |
| Competition | First match | Last match | Starting round | Final position | Pld | W | D | L | GF | GA | GD | Win % |
|---|---|---|---|---|---|---|---|---|---|---|---|---|
| La Liga | 12 August 2023 | 25 May 2024 | Matchday 1 | 6th | 38 | 16 | 12 | 10 | 51 | 39 | +12 | 42.11 |
| Copa del Rey | 1 November 2023 | 27 February 2024 | First round | Semi-finals | 7 | 5 | 2 | 0 | 8 | 2 | +6 | 71.43 |
| UEFA Champions League | 20 September 2023 | 5 March 2024 | Group stage | Round of 16 | 8 | 3 | 3 | 2 | 8 | 6 | +2 | 37.50 |
| Total | | | | | 53 | 24 | 17 | 12 | 67 | 47 | +20 | 45.28 |

Source: Soccerway

=== La Liga ===
==== League table ====
| Pos | Team | Pld | W | D | L | GF | GA | GD | Pts | Qualification or relegation |
|---|---|---|---|---|---|---|---|---|---|---|
| 4 | Atlético Madrid | 38 | 24 | 4 | 10 | 70 | 43 | +27 | 76 | Qualification for the Champions League league phase |
| 5 | Athletic Bilbao | 38 | 19 | 11 | 8 | 61 | 37 | +24 | 68 | Qualification for the Europa League league phase (Note: Since the winners of the 2023–24 Copa del Rey, Athletic Bilbao, qualified for European competition based on league position, the Europa League berth awarded to the Copa del Rey winners was passed to the sixth-placed team, and the Conference League berth awarded to the sixth-placed team was passed to the seventh-placed team.) |
| 6 | Real Sociedad | 38 | 16 | 12 | 10 | 51 | 39 | +12 | 60 | Qualification for the Europa League league phase |
| 7 | Real Betis | 38 | 14 | 15 | 9 | 48 | 45 | +3 | 57 | Qualification for the Conference League play-off round |
| 8 | Villarreal | 38 | 14 | 11 | 13 | 65 | 65 | 0 | 53 | |

Source: LaLiga EA Sports
Rules for classification: 1) Points; 2) Head-to-head points; 3) Head-to-head goal difference; 4) Goal difference; 5) Goals scored; 6) Fair-play points
(Note: Head-to-head record is used only after all the matches between the teams in question have been played)

==== Results summary ====
| Overall | | | | | | | | Home | | | | | | Away | | | | | |
| Pld | W | D | L | GF | GA | GD | Pts | W | D | L | GF | GA | GD | W | D | L | GF | GA | GD |
|---|---|---|---|---|---|---|---|---|---|---|---|---|---|---|---|---|---|---|---|
| 38 | 16 | 12 | 10 | 51 | 39 | +12 | 60 | 8 | 6 | 5 | 26 | 20 | +6 | 8 | 6 | 5 | 25 | 19 | +6 |

Source: La Liga

==== Results by round ====
| Round | 1 | 2 | 3 | 4 | 5 | 6 | 7 | 8 | 9 | 10 | 11 | 12 | 13 | 14 | 15 | 16 | 17 | 18 | 19 | 20 | 21 | 22 | 23 | 24 | 25 | 26 | 27 | 28 | 29 | 30 | 31 | 32 | 33 | 34 | 35 | 36 | 37 | 38 |
|---|---|---|---|---|---|---|---|---|---|---|---|---|---|---|---|---|---|---|---|---|---|---|---|---|---|---|---|---|---|---|---|---|---|---|---|---|---|---|
| Ground | H | H | A | H | A | H | A | H | A | H | A | H | A | H | A | A | H | A | H | A | A | H | A | H | A | H | A | A | H | A | H | A | H | H | A | H | A | H |
| Result | D | D | D | W | L | W | W | W | L | W | D | L | W | W | D | W | D | D | D | L | W | D | D | L | W | L | L | W | W | W | D | D | L | W | L | W | W | L |
| Position | 9 | 13 | 12 | 8 | 11 | 8 | 6 | 5 | 6 | 5 | 5 | 7 | 6 | 6 | 6 | 6 | 6 | 6 | 6 | 6 | 6 | 6 | 6 | 7 | 6 | 7 | 7 | 6 | 6 | 6 | 6 | 6 | 6 | 6 | 7 | 6 | 6 | 6 |
| Points | 1 | 2 | 3 | 6 | 6 | 9 | 12 | 15 | 15 | 18 | 19 | 19 | 22 | 25 | 26 | 29 | 30 | 31 | 32 | 32 | 35 | 36 | 37 | 37 | 40 | 40 | 40 | 43 | 46 | 49 | 50 | 51 | 51 | 54 | 54 | 57 | 60 | 60 |

Source: La Liga
A = Away; H = Home; W = Win; D = Draw; L = Loss

==== Matches ====
The league fixtures were unveiled on 22 June 2023.

| 12 August 2023 1 | Real Sociedad | 1–1 | Girona | San Sebastián |
| 17:00 CEST (UTC+2) | Kubo 5'; Le Normand (yellow card) 45+3'; Olasagasti (yellow card) 85' | Report | Martínez (yellow card) 9'; Stuani (yellow card) 45+3'; Dovbyk 72'; Gutiérrez (yellow card) 79'; López (yellow card) 90+1'; Gazzaniga (yellow card) 90+2' | Stadium: Reale Arena; Attendance: 30,848; Referee: Francisco José Hernández Maeso |

| 19 August 2023 2 | Real Sociedad | 1–1 | Celta Vigo | San Sebastián |
| 17:00 CEST (UTC+2) | Barrenetxea 22'; Zubimendi (yellow card) 40'; Le Normand (yellow card) 69' | Report | Aspas (yellow card) 51'; Mingueza 90+4' | Stadium: Reale Arena; Attendance: 30,354; Referee: Miguel Ángel Ortiz Arias |

| 25 August 2023 3 | Las Palmas | 0–0 | Real Sociedad | Las Palmas |
| 18:30 WEST (UTC+1) | S. Cardona (yellow card) 45' | Report | Le Normand (yellow card) 44'; Méndez (yellow card) 72'; Zubeldia (yellow card) 82'; Sadiq (yellow card) 90+1' | Stadium: Estadio Gran Canaria; Attendance: 25,335; Referee: Guillermo Cuadra Fernández |

| 2 September 2023 4 | Real Sociedad | 5–3 | Granada | San Sebastián |
| 14:00 CEST (UTC+2) | Kubo 9', 44'; Oyarzabal (yellow card) 54'; Zubimendi 59'; Barrenetxea 67'; Bosch 76' (o.g.) | Report | Le Normand 35' (o.g.); Boyé (yellow card) 38', (goal) 83'; Ruiz (yellow card) 53'; Díaz (yellow card) 54'; Zaragoza (yellow card) 86', (goal) 90+9' | Stadium: Reale Arena; Attendance: 25,335; Referee: Guillermo Cuadra Fernández |

| 17 September 2023 5 | Real Madrid | 2–1 | Real Sociedad | Madrid |
| 21:00 CEST (UTC+2) | Tchouaméni (yellow card) 33'; Valverde 46'; Joselu 60'; García (yellow card) 71'; Alaba (yellow card) 90+4' | Report | Barrenetxea 5'; Merino (yellow card) 68'; Traoré (yellow card) 77' | Stadium: Santiago Bernabéu; Attendance: 70,092; Referee: César Soto Grado |

| 24 September 2023 6 | Real Sociedad | 4–3 | Getafe | San Sebastián |
| 14:00 CEST (UTC+2) | Kubo 2'; Méndez (yellow card) 45+1', (goal) 66'; Muñoz (yellow card) 45+3'; Oyarzabal 61' (pen.), 88' | Report | Rico (yellow card) 19'; Aleñá 39'; Mayoral 45+5' (pen.); Suárez (yellow card) 49'; Latasa 90+2' | Stadium: Reale Arena; Attendance: 29,568; Referee: Juan Luis Pulido Santana |

| 27 September 2023 7 | Valencia | 0–1 | Real Sociedad | Valencia |
| 21:30 CEST (UTC+2) | Amallah (yellow card) 42' (yellow-red card) 45'; Guerra (yellow card) 45+3'; Mosquera (yellow card) 79' | Report | González de Zárate (yellow card) 14'; Pacheco (yellow card) 25'; Fernández 32', (yellow card) 62'; Traoré (yellow card) 45+2'; Méndez (yellow card) 68'; Merino (yellow card) 81'; Zubeldia (yellow card) 89' | Stadium: Mestalla; Attendance: 44,200; Referee: Alejandro Hernández Hernández |

| 30 September 2023 8 | Real Sociedad | 3–0 | Athletic Bilbao | San Sebastián |
| 21:00 CEST (UTC+2) | Le Normand 30'; Merino (yellow card) 44'; Kubo 48'; Oyarzabal 66'; Zubeldia (yellow card) 77' | Report | Herrera (yellow card) 29'; Vivian (yellow card) 44' | Stadium: Reale Arena; Attendance: 38,229; Referee: Jesús Gil Manzano |

| 8 October 2023 9 | Atlético Madrid | 2–1 | Real Sociedad | Madrid |
| 16:15 CEST (UTC+2) | Lino 22'; Koke (yellow card) 48'; Griezmann 89' (pen.), (yellow card) 90+6'; Galán (yellow card) 90+7' | Report | Le Normand (yellow card) 15'; Oyarzabal 73'; Traoré (yellow card) 86'; Fernández (yellow card) 87' | Stadium: Cívitas Metropolitano; Attendance: 65,607; Referee: José Luis Munuera Montero |

| 21 October 2023 10 | Real Sociedad | 1–0 | Mallorca | San Sebastián |
| 14:00 CEST (UTC+2) | Zubeldia (yellow card) 47'; Méndez 64', (yellow card) 90+3'; Pacheco (yellow card) 71' | Report | Copete (yellow card) 15'; Lato (yellow card) 41'; Sánchez (yellow card) 43' | Stadium: Reale Arena; Attendance: 31,279; Referee: Jorge Figueroa Vázquez |

| 29 October 2023 11 | Rayo Vallecano | 2–2 | Real Sociedad | Madrid |
| 16:15 CET (UTC+1) | Lejeune (yellow card) 13'; Mumin 31'; García (yellow card) 66'; Bebé 90+1', (yellow card) 90+2' | Report | Oyarzabal 41', 66' (pen.); Turrientes (yellow card) 72'; Zubeldia (yellow card) 74' | Stadium: Campo de Fútbol de Vallecas; Attendance: 12,970; Referee: Mateo Busquets Ferrer |

| 4 November 2023 12 | Real Sociedad | 0–1 | Barcelona | San Sebastián |
| 21:00 CET (UTC+1) | Méndez (yellow card) 49'; Zubeldia (yellow card) 74'; Zubimendi (yellow card) 84' | Report | Félix (yellow card) 49'; Martínez (yellow card) 60'; Gavi (yellow card) 86'; Araújo 90+2' | Stadium: Reale Arena; Attendance: 37,555; Referee: Javier Alberola Rojas |

| 11 November 2023 13 | Almería | 1–3 | Real Sociedad | Almería |
| 16:15 CET (UTC+1) | Robertone (yellow card) 27'; Embarba (yellow card) 50'; Arribas 76' | Report | Sadiq (yellow card) 32'; Muñoz (yellow card) 45'; Oyarzabal 62'; Fernández 90+1' (pen.); Zubimendi 90+5' | Stadium: Power Horse Stadium; Attendance: 13,016; Referee: Isidro Díaz de Mera Escuderos |

| 26 November 2023 14 | Real Sociedad | 2–1 | Sevilla | San Sebastián |
| 16:15 CET (UTC+1) | Dmitrović 3' (o.g.); Sadiq 22'; Merino (yellow card) 33'; Traoré (yellow card) 78' | Report | En-Nesyri 60'; Ramos (yellow card) 82', (red card) 88'; Navas (red card) 88' | Stadium: Reale Arena; Attendance: 33,879; Referee: Miguel Ángel Ortiz Arias |

| 2 December 2023 15 | Osasuna | 1–1 | Real Sociedad | Pamplona |
| 21:00 CET (UTC+1) | Gómez 2'; Catena (yellow card) 58'; Budimir (yellow card) 61'; Ra. García (yellow card) 86' | Report | Sadiq 41'; Tierney (yellow card) 49'; Kubo (yellow card) 65'; Le Normand (yellow card) 84' | Stadium: El Sadar; Attendance: 20,859; Referee: Juan Luis Pulido Santana |

| 9 December 2023 16 | Villarreal | 0–3 | Real Sociedad | Villarreal |
| 18:30 CET (UTC+1) | Capoue (yellow card) 23'; Pedraza (yellow card) 49' | Report | Merino 38'; Zubimendi 41', (yellow card) 60'; Kubo 45+4' | Stadium: Estadio de la Cerámica; Attendance: 19,344; Referee: Mario Melero López |

| 17 December 2023 17 | Real Sociedad | 0–0 | Real Betis | San Sebastián |
| 16:15 CET (UTC+1) | Olasagasti (yellow card) 85'; Le Normand (yellow card) 86' | Report | Roca (yellow card) 43'; Ruibal (yellow card) 68'; Pérez (yellow card) 78'; Isco (yellow card) 87' | Stadium: Reale Arena; Attendance: 33,172; Referee: Mateo Busquets Ferrer |

| 21 December 2023 18 | Cádiz | 0–0 | Real Sociedad | Cádiz |
| 19:00 CET (UTC+1) | Alejo (yellow card) 32'; Fali (yellow card) 55'; Alcaraz (yellow card) 85' | Report | Remiro (yellow card) 85' | Stadium: Nuevo Mirandilla; Attendance: 17,693; Referee: Javier Iglesias Villanueva |

| 3 January 2024 19 | Real Sociedad | 1–1 | Alavés | San Sebastián |
| 19:15 CET (UTC+1) | Remiro (red card) 36'; Zubeldia (yellow card) 45+2'; Fernández (yellow card) 74'; Traoré (yellow card) 74'; Zubimendi 90+6'; Oyarzabal (yellow card) 90+8'; Sadiq (yellow card) 90+11' | Report | Rebbach (yellow card) 50'; Omorodion (yellow card) 59'; Rioja 76' (pen.); Sivera (yellow card) 87'; Kike (yellow card) 90+3' | Stadium: Reale Arena; Attendance: 34,051; Referee: Víctor García Verdura |

| 13 January 2024 20 | Athletic Bilbao | 2–1 | Real Sociedad | Bilbao |
| 18:30 CET (UTC+1) | Berenguer 30', 42'; Gómez (yellow card) 90+3' | Report | Barrenetxea (yellow card) 61'; Oyarzabal 88'; Merino (yellow card) 90'; Le Normand (yellow card) 90+2'; Elustondo (yellow card) 90+3' | Stadium: San Mamés; Attendance: 51,475; Referee: José Luis Munuera Montero |

| 20 January 2024 21 | Celta Vigo | 0–1 | Real Sociedad | Vigo |
| 21:00 CET (UTC+1) | Rodríguez (yellow card) 15' | Report | Méndez 11'; Aramburu (yellow card) 30'; Merino (yellow card) 84' | Stadium: Balaídos; Attendance: 20,901; Referee: Jorge Figueroa Vázquez |

| 27 January 2024 22 | Real Sociedad | 0–0 | Rayo Vallecano | San Sebastián |
| 14:00 CET (UTC+1) | Galán (yellow card) 70'; Pacheco (yellow card) 90+4' | Report | Trejo (yellow card) 7'; Balliu (yellow card) 19'; López (yellow card) 57'; Nteka (yellow card) 85' | Stadium: Reale Arena; Attendance: 32,528; Referee: Alejandro Hernández Hernández |

| 3 February 2024 23 | Girona | 0–0 | Real Sociedad | Girona |
| 21:00 CET (UTC+1) | Herrera (yellow card) 88'; Blind (yellow card) 90+7' | Report | Turrientes (yellow card) 21'; Méndez (yellow card) 45+1'; Zubeldia (yellow card) 64' | Stadium: Montilivi; Attendance: 13,755; Referee: Jesús Gil Manzano |

| 10 February 2024 24 | Real Sociedad | 0–1 | Osasuna | San Sebastián |
| 16:15 CET (UTC+1) | | Report | Budimir 49' | Stadium: Reale Arena; Attendance: 32,905; Referee: Isidro Díaz de Mera Escuderos |

| 18 February 2024 25 | Mallorca | 1–2 | Real Sociedad | Palma |
| 18:30 CET (UTC+1) | Sánchez 4', (yellow card) 31'; Rajković (yellow card) 45+1'; Raíllo (yellow card) 45+3' (yellow-red card) 45+4'; Nastasić (yellow card) 82'; S. Costa (yellow card) 90'; Darder (yellow card) 90+6'; Van der Heyden (red card) 90+7'; Rodríguez (yellow card) 90+7'; Muriqi (yellow card) 90+7' | Report | Kubo 38'; Le Normand (yellow card) 41'; Zubeldia (yellow card) 61'; Pacheco (yellow card) 77'; Merino 90+3', (yellow card) 90+6'; Turrientes (yellow card) 90+6' | Stadium: Estadi Mallorca Son Moix; Attendance: 18,153; Referee: Pablo González Fuertes |

| 23 February 2024 26 | Real Sociedad | 1–3 | Villarreal | San Sebastián |
| 21:00 CET (UTC+1) | Le Normand (yellow card) 51'; Silva (yellow card) 62'; Zakharyan (yellow card) 68'; Merino 86' | Report | Comesaña 17', 47'; Jörgensen (yellow card) 60'; Mosquera (yellow card) 62'; Albiol (yellow card) 63'; Cuenca (yellow card) 88'; Sørloth 90+5' | Stadium: Reale Arena; Attendance: 30,609; Referee: Javier Iglesias Villanueva |

| 2 March 2024 27 | Sevilla | 3–2 | Real Sociedad | Seville |
| 14:00 CET (UTC+1) | En-Nesyri 11', 13'; Ramos 65'; Nianzou (yellow card) 87' | Report | Silva 45+5' (pen.); Pacheco (yellow card) 67'; Méndez 90+2'; Zubeldia (yellow card) 90+7' | Stadium: Ramón Sánchez Pizjuán; Attendance: 35,884; Referee: Mateo Busquets Ferrer |

| 9 March 2024 28 | Granada | 2–3 | Real Sociedad | Granada |
| 18:30 CET (UTC+1) | Uzuni 21', 45+3'; Ruiz (yellow card) 45+1' | Report | Traoré (yellow card) 23'; Sadiq 33', (yellow card) 63'; Le Normand 80'; Silva 85' | Stadium: Nuevo Los Cármenes; Attendance: 9,214; Referee: Juan Martínez Munuera |

| 15 March 2024 29 | Real Sociedad | 2–0 | Cádiz | San Sebastián |
| 21:00 CET (UTC+1) | Merino 28'; Galán (yellow card) 45'; Zubimendi (yellow card) 45+2'; Zakharyan 68'; Le Normand (yellow card) 70' | Report | Ramos (yellow card) 70' | Stadium: Reale Arena; Attendance: 31,000; Referee: César Soto Grado |

| 31 March 2024 30 | Alavés | 0–1 | Real Sociedad | Vitoria-Gasteiz |
| 18:30 CEST (UTC+2) | Guevara (yellow card) 62'; Abqar (yellow card) 86' | Report | Pacheco 59', (yellow card) 89'; Merino (yellow card) 80' | Stadium: Mendizorrotza; Attendance: 18,575; Referee: Francisco José Hernández Maeso |

| 14 April 2024 31 | Real Sociedad | 2–2 | Almería | San Sebastián |
| 21:00 CEST (UTC+2) | Becker 32'; Oyarzabal 59'; Le Normand (yellow card) 75'; Zubeldia (red card) 86'; Zubimendi (yellow card) 90+4' | Report | Embarba 30', 88' (pen.); Romero (yellow card) 36'; Ramazani (yellow card) 90+4' | Stadium: Reale Arena; Attendance: 26,520; Referee: Isidro Díaz de Mera Escuderos |

| 21 April 2024 32 | Getafe | 1–1 | Real Sociedad | Getafe |
| 14:00 CEST (UTC+2) | Latasa 29' | Report | Barrenetxea 13'; Merino (yellow card) 39'; Elustondo (yellow card) 90+5' | Stadium: Coliseum; Attendance: 12,228; Referee: Víctor García Verdura |

| 26 April 2024 33 | Real Sociedad | 0–1 | Real Madrid | San Sebastián |
| 21:00 CEST (UTC+2) | Le Normand (yellow card) 40'; Zubeldia (yellow card) 70'; Merino (yellow card) 87' | Report | Güler (yellow card) 15', (goal) 29'; García (yellow card) 56'; Tchouaméni (yellow card) 83'; Nacho (yellow card) 88' | Stadium: Reale Arena; Attendance: 37,109; Referee: José Luis Munuera Montero |

| 4 May 2024 34 | Real Sociedad | 2–0 | Las Palmas | San Sebastián |
| 14:00 CEST (UTC+2) | Galán (yellow card) 17'; Suárez 33' (o.g.); Le Normand (yellow card) 40'; Becker 45+1' | Report | S. Cardona (yellow card) 67' | Stadium: Reale Arena; Attendance: 29,330; Referee: Miguel Ángel Ortiz Arias |

| 13 May 2024 35 | Barcelona | 2–0 | Real Sociedad | Barcelona |
| 21:00 CEST (UTC+2) | Yamal 40'; Gündoğan (yellow card) 51'; Raphinha 90+3' (pen.), (yellow card) 90+4' | Report | Aramburu (yellow card) 57'; Pacheco (yellow card) 64'; Oyarzabal (yellow card) 90+2' | Stadium: Estadi Olímpic Lluís Companys; Attendance: 35,829; Referee: Guillermo Cuadra Fernández |

| 16 May 2024 36 | Real Sociedad | 1–0 | Valencia | San Sebastián |
| 22:00 CEST (UTC+2) | Silva 3' | Report | Guillamón (yellow card) 29'; Canós (yellow card) 90+4' | Stadium: Reale Arena; Attendance: 25,067; Referee: César Soto Grado |

| 19 May 2024 37 | Real Betis | 0–2 | Real Sociedad | Seville |
| 19:00 CEST (UTC+2) | Sabaly (yellow card) 58'; Ezzalzouli (penalty missed) 66'; Miranda (yellow card) 83'; Fekir (yellow card) 90+1' | Report | Méndez 5'; Merino 42'; Turrientes (yellow card) 52'; Traoré (yellow card) 74'; Becker (yellow card) 78'; Aramburu (yellow card) 90+1' | Stadium: Benito Villamarín; Attendance: 58,036; Referee: Juan Martínez Munuera |

| 25 May 2024 38 | Real Sociedad | 0–2 | Atlético Madrid | San Sebastián |
| 16:15 CEST (UTC+2) | Pacheco (yellow card) 45+2'; Méndez (yellow card) 57'; Olasagasti (yellow card) 90' | Report | Lino 9'; Vermeeren (yellow card) 41'; Koke (yellow card) 45'; Saúl (yellow card) 80' (yellow-red card) 90+1'; Mandava (yellow card) 87', (goal) 90+3' | Stadium: Reale Arena; Attendance: 30,678; Referee: José María Sánchez Martínez |

=== Copa del Rey ===
| 1 November 2023 First round | Buñol | 0–1 | Real Sociedad | Requena |
| 18:30 CET (UTC+1) | López (yellow card) 50'; Ducó (yellow card) 59'; Caballero (yellow card) 69' | Report | Fernández 67'; Marrero (yellow card) 89'; Pacheco (yellow card) 90+5' | Stadium: Tomás Berlanga; Attendance: 4,000; Referee: Guillermo Cuadra Fernández |
Note: The match was played at the Tomás Berlanga in Requena, instead of Buñol's regular stadium, the Beltrán Báguena in Buñol, which did not meet the broadcasting requirements.

| 6 December 2023 Second round | Andratx | 0–1 | Real Sociedad | Andratx |
| 16:00 CET (UTC+1) | Aveldaño (yellow card) 85'; Peñafort (yellow card) 90+4' | Report | Silva 56'; Pacheco (yellow card) 90+4' | Stadium: Sa Plana; Attendance: 1,233; Referee: José María Sánchez Martínez |

| 7 January 2024 Round of 32 | Málaga | 0–1 | Real Sociedad | Málaga |
| 21:00 CET (UTC+1) | Juanpe (yellow card) 48'; Diarra (yellow card) 51' | Report | Galilea 49' (o.g.); Muñoz (yellow card) 62'; Fernández (yellow card) 63' | Stadium: La Rosaleda; Attendance: 22,111; Referee: Jesús Gil Manzano |

| 17 January 2024 Round of 16 | Osasuna | 0–2 | Real Sociedad | Pamplona |
| 21:00 CET (UTC+1) | Catena (red card) 56'; Areso (yellow card) 57'; Fernández (yellow card) 90+6' | Report | Oyarzabal 57' (pen.); Magunazelaia (yellow card) 75'; Le Normand (yellow card) 88'; Méndez (penalty missed) 90+7'; Merino 90+7' | Stadium: El Sadar; Attendance: 21,116; Referee: Alejandro Hernández Hernández |

| 23 January 2024 Quarter-finals | Celta Vigo | 1–2 | Real Sociedad | Vigo |
| 21:30 CET (UTC+1) | Douvikas (yellow card) 45+2'; Núñez (yellow card) 74'; De la Torre 90+2'; Larsen (yellow card) 90+3'; Ristić (yellow card) 90+4' | Report | Oyarzabal 2'; Merino (yellow card) 65'; Becker 66'; Magunazelaia (yellow card) 90+5' | Stadium: Balaídos; Attendance: 20,903; Referee: César Soto Grado |

| 6 February 2024 Semi-finals; First leg | Mallorca | 0–0 | Real Sociedad | Palma |
| 21:00 CET (UTC+1) | Copete (yellow card) 47'; Rodríguez (yellow card) 68'; J. Costa (yellow card) 90+7' | Report | Zubeldia (yellow card) 55'; Merino (yellow card) 81'; Silva (yellow card) 90+5' | Stadium: Estadi Mallorca Son Moix; Attendance: 22,051; Referee: Alejandro Muñiz Ruiz |

| 27 February 2024 Semi-finals; Second leg | Real Sociedad | 1–1 (a.e.t.) (1–1 agg.) (4–5 p) | Mallorca | San Sebastián |
| 21:30 CET (UTC+1) | Méndez (penalty missed) 45+1'; Oyarzabal 71'; Le Normand (yellow card) 113' | Report | Copete (yellow card) 21'; González 50'; J. Costa (yellow card) 88'; Muriqi (yellow card) 105+4' | Stadium: Reale Arena; Attendance: 35,781; Referee: Jesús Gil Manzano |
| | Penalties |
| | Oyarzabal (penalty missed); Turrientes (penalty scored); Olasagasti (penalty scored); Zubimendi (penalty scored); Becker (penalty scored) | | (penalty scored) Muriqi; (penalty scored) Morlanes; (penalty scored) Mascarell; (penalty scored) Radonjić; (penalty scored) Darder |

=== UEFA Champions League ===
==== Group stage ====
The draw for the group stage was held on 31 August 2023.

| Pos | Team | Pld | W | D | L | GF | GA | GD | Pts | Qualification | RSO | INT | BEN | SAL |
|---|---|---|---|---|---|---|---|---|---|---|---|---|---|---|
| 1 | (Spain) Real Sociedad | 6 | 3 | 3 | 0 | 7 | 2 | +5 | 12 (Note: Tied on head-to-head points, goal difference, and goals scored. Goal difference in all matches: Real Sociedad +5, Inter Milan +3.) | Advance to knockout phase | — | 1–1 | 3–1 | 0–0 |
| 2 | (Italy) Inter Milan | 6 | 3 | 3 | 0 | 8 | 5 | +3 | 12 | Advance to knockout phase | 0–0 | — | 1–0 | 2–1 |
| 3 | (Portugal) Benfica | 6 | 1 | 1 | 4 | 7 | 11 | −4 | 4 (Note: Tied on head-to-head points, goal difference, goals scored, and goal difference in all matches. Goals scored in all matches: Benfica 7, Red Bull Salzburg 4.) | Transfer to Europa League | 0–1 | 3–3 | — | 0–2 |
| 4 | (Austria) Red Bull Salzburg | 6 | 1 | 1 | 4 | 4 | 8 | −4 | 4 | | 0–2 | 0–1 | 1–3 | — |

Source: UEFA
Rules for classification: Group stage tiebreakers
Notes:

| 20 September 2023 1 | Real Sociedad (Spain) | 1–1 | (Italy) Inter Milan | San Sebastián |
| 21:00 CEST (UTC+2) | Méndez 4'; Merino (yellow card) 70'; Traoré (yellow card) 88'; Zubeldia (yellow card) 90+5' | Report | Asllani (yellow card) 13'; Mkhitaryan (yellow card) 60'; Frattesi (yellow card) 70'; Martínez 87' | Stadium: Reale Arena; Attendance: 36,591; Referee: Michael Oliver (England) |

| 3 October 2023 2 | Red Bull Salzburg (Austria) | 0–2 | (Spain) Real Sociedad | Salzburg, Austria |
| 18:45 CEST (UTC+2) | Solet (yellow card) 41'; Pavlović (yellow card) 76'; Baidoo (yellow card) 88' | Report | Oyarzabal 7'; Le Normand (yellow card) 15'; Méndez 27', (yellow card) 59' | Stadium: Red Bull Arena; Attendance: 28,227; Referee: Bartosz Frankowski (Poland) |

| 24 October 2023 3 | Benfica (Portugal) | 0–1 | (Spain) Real Sociedad | Lisbon, Portugal |
| 20:00 WEST (UTC+1) | Bernat (yellow card) 77' | Report | Méndez 63'; Elustondo (yellow card) 71'; Merino (yellow card) 75' | Stadium: Estádio da Luz; Attendance: 56,002; Referee: Clément Turpin (France) |

| 8 November 2023 4 | Real Sociedad (Spain) | 3–1 | (Portugal) Benfica | San Sebastián |
| 18:45 CET (UTC+1) | Merino 6'; Oyarzabal 11'; Barrenetxea 21', (yellow card) 63'; Méndez (penalty missed) 29'; Fernández (yellow card) 86' | Report | Florentino (yellow card) 20'; R. Silva 49' | Stadium: Reale Arena; Attendance: 36,815; Referee: Anthony Taylor (England) |

| 29 November 2023 5 | Real Sociedad (Spain) | 0–0 | (Austria) Red Bull Salzburg | San Sebastián |
| 21:00 CET (UTC+1) | Elustondo (yellow card) 38' | Report | Dedić (yellow card) 90+1' | Stadium: Reale Arena; Attendance: 34,419; Referee: Mykola Balakin (Ukraine) |

| 12 December 2023 6 | Inter Milan (Italy) | 0–0 | (Spain) Real Sociedad | Milan, Italy |
| 21:00 CET (UTC+1) | Martínez (yellow card) 75' | Report | Zubeldia (yellow card) 21'; Zakharyan (yellow card) 44'; Kubo (yellow card) 76'; Elustondo (yellow card) 85' | Stadium: San Siro; Attendance: 69,010; Referee: Sandro Schärer (Switzerland) |

==== Knockout phase ====
===== Round of 16 =====
The draw for the round of 16 was held on 18 December 2023.

| 14 February 2024 First leg | Paris Saint-Germain (France) | 2–0 | (Spain) Real Sociedad | Paris, France |
| 21:00 CET (UTC+1) | K. Mbappé 58'; Barcola 70' | Report | Le Normand (yellow card) 36'; Traoré (yellow card) 90+2' | Stadium: Parc des Princes; Attendance: 46,435; Referee: Marco Guida (Italy) |

| 5 March 2024 Second leg | Real Sociedad (Spain) | 1–2 (1–4 agg.) | (France) Paris Saint-Germain | San Sebastián |
| 21:00 CET (UTC+1) | Kubo (yellow card) 42'; Zubeldia (yellow card) 54'; Merino 89' | Report | K. Mbappé 15', 56'; Mendes (yellow card) 28'; Hakimi (yellow card) 41'; Dembélé (yellow card) 45+4' | Stadium: Reale Arena; Attendance: 39,336; Referee: Michael Oliver (England) |

== Statistics ==
=== Squad statistics ===
| No. | Pos | Nat | Player | Total | | La Liga | | Copa del Rey | | UEFA Champions League | |
| No. | Pos | Nat | Player | Apps | Goals | Apps | Goals | Apps | Goals | Apps | Goals |
Goalkeepers
| 1 | GK | (Spain) ESP | Álex Remiro | 49 | 0 | 37 | 0 | 4 | 0 | 8 | 0 |
| 32 | GK | (Spain) ESP | Unai Marrero | 5 | 0 | 1+1 | 0 | 3 | 0 | 0 | 0 |
| 37 | GK | (Spain) ESP | Aitor Fraga | 0 | 0 | 0 | 0 | 0 | 0 | 0 | 0 |
Defenders
| 2 | DF | (Spain) ESP | Álvaro Odriozola | 15 | 0 | 6+3 | 0 | 3 | 0 | 1+2 | 0 |
| 3 | DF | (Spain) ESP | Aihen Muñoz | 29 | 0 | 11+10 | 0 | 2 | 0 | 5+1 | 0 |
| 6 | DF | (Spain) ESP | Aritz Elustondo | 25 | 0 | 7+8 | 0 | 2+3 | 0 | 2+3 | 0 |
| 17 | DF | (Scotland) SCO | Kieran Tierney | 26 | 0 | 14+6 | 0 | 2+2 | 0 | 1+1 | 0 |
| 18 | DF | (Mali) MLI | Hamari Traoré | 40 | 0 | 27+4 | 0 | 2 | 0 | 6+1 | 0 |
| 20 | DF | (Spain) ESP | Jon Pacheco | 31 | 1 | 16+7 | 1 | 2+1 | 0 | 0+5 | 0 |
| 24 | DF | (Spain) ESP | Robin Le Normand | 43 | 2 | 28+1 | 2 | 6+1 | 0 | 7 | 0 |
| 25 | DF | (Spain) ESP | Javi Galán | 18 | 0 | 13+1 | 0 | 2 | 0 | 2 | 0 |
| 26 | DF | (Spain) ESP | Urko González de Zárate | 8 | 0 | 2+3 | 0 | 3 | 0 | 0 | 0 |
| 36 | DF | (Spain) ESP | Jon Martín | 1 | 0 | 0+1 | 0 | 0 | 0 | 0 | 0 |
| 39 | DF | (Venezuela) VEN | Jon Aramburu | 15 | 0 | 5+6 | 0 | 1+2 | 0 | 1 | 0 |
Midfielders
| 4 | MF | (Spain) ESP | Martín Zubimendi | 45 | 4 | 29+2 | 4 | 4+2 | 0 | 8 | 0 |
| 5 | MF | (Spain) ESP | Igor Zubeldia | 43 | 0 | 29+1 | 0 | 5 | 0 | 8 | 0 |
| 8 | MF | (Spain) ESP | Mikel Merino | 45 | 8 | 27+5 | 5 | 5+1 | 1 | 7 | 2 |
| 12 | MF | (Russia) RUS | Arsen Zakharyan | 40 | 1 | 15+14 | 1 | 5+1 | 0 | 2+3 | 0 |
| 14 | MF | (Japan) JPN | Takefusa Kubo | 41 | 7 | 24+6 | 7 | 2+1 | 0 | 7+1 | 0 |
| 16 | MF | (Spain) ESP | Jon Ander Olasagasti | 18 | 0 | 2+12 | 0 | 2+1 | 0 | 0+1 | 0 |
| 22 | MF | (Spain) ESP | Beñat Turrientes | 41 | 0 | 19+10 | 0 | 2+4 | 0 | 1+5 | 0 |
| 23 | MF | (Spain) ESP | Brais Méndez | 44 | 8 | 27+5 | 5 | 4+1 | 0 | 7 | 3 |
| 28 | MF | (Spain) ESP | Jon Magunazelaia | 11 | 0 | 1+4 | 0 | 1+4 | 0 | 0+1 | 0 |
| 29 | MF | (Spain) ESP | Pablo Marín | 0 | 0 | 0 | 0 | 0 | 0 | 0 | 0 |
Forwards
| 7 | FW | (Spain) ESP | Ander Barrenetxea | 39 | 5 | 20+9 | 4 | 3 | 0 | 5+2 | 1 |
| 9 | FW | (Spain) ESP | Carlos Fernández | 16 | 3 | 5+5 | 2 | 0+2 | 1 | 0+4 | 0 |
| 10 | FW | (Spain) ESP | Mikel Oyarzabal | 44 | 14 | 23+10 | 9 | 3+1 | 3 | 7 | 2 |
| 11 | FW | (Suriname) SUR | Sheraldo Becker | 18 | 3 | 8+7 | 2 | 1+1 | 1 | 1 | 0 |
| 19 | FW | (Nigeria) NGR | Umar Sadiq | 36 | 3 | 12+14 | 3 | 2+4 | 0 | 1+3 | 0 |
| 21 | FW | (Portugal) POR | André Silva | 26 | 4 | 9+10 | 3 | 4+1 | 1 | 1+1 | 0 |
| 38 | FW | (Spain) ESP | Alberto Dadie | 3 | 0 | 0+1 | 0 | 1+1 | 0 | 0 | 0 |
Players who transferred out during the season
| 2 | DF | (Spain) ESP | Álex Sola | 2 | 0 | 0+2 | 0 | 0 | 0 | 0 | 0 |
| 11 | FW | (France) FRA | Momo Cho | 16 | 0 | 1+10 | 0 | 1 | 0 | 1+3 | 0 |
| 15 | DF | (Spain) ESP | Diego Rico | 0 | 0 | 0 | 0 | 0 | 0 | 0 | 0 |

=== Goalscorers ===
| Position | Players | LaLiga | Copa del Rey | Champions League | Total |
|---|---|---|---|---|---|
| FW | (Spain) Mikel Oyarzabal | 9 | 3 | 2 | 14 |
| MF | (Spain) Brais Méndez | 5 | 0 | 3 | 8 |
| MF | (Spain) Mikel Merino | 5 | 1 | 2 | 8 |
| MF | (Japan) Takefusa Kubo | 7 | 0 | 0 | 7 |
| FW | (Spain) Ander Barrenetxea | 4 | 0 | 1 | 5 |
| FW | (Portugal) André Silva | 3 | 1 | 0 | 4 |
| MF | (Spain) Martín Zubimendi | 4 | 0 | 0 | 4 |
| FW | (Suriname) Sheraldo Becker | 2 | 1 | 0 | 3 |
| FW | (Spain) Carlos Fernández | 2 | 1 | 0 | 3 |
| FW | (Nigeria) Umar Sadiq | 3 | 0 | 0 | 3 |
| DF | (Spain) Jon Pacheco | 1 | 0 | 0 | 1 |
| MF | (Russia) Arsen Zakharyan | 1 | 0 | 0 | 1 |
