= 2022–23 Real Sociedad season =

Real Sociedad
2022–23 season
- President: Jokin Aperribay
- Head coach: Imanol Alguacil
- Stadium: Anoeta Stadium
- La Liga: 4th
- Copa del Rey: Quarter-finals
- UEFA Europa League: Round of 16
- Top goalscorer: League: Alexander Sørloth (12); All: Alexander Sørloth (16)
- Highest home attendance: 38,296 vs Athletic Bilbao
- Lowest home attendance: 25,806 vs Sheriff Tiraspol
- Biggest win: Coria 0–5 Real Sociedad
- Biggest defeat: Real Sociedad 1–4 Barcelona
Home colours	Away colours

The 2022–23 season was the 113th season in the history of Real Sociedad and their 13th consecutive season in the top flight. The club participated in La Liga, the Copa del Rey, and the UEFA Europa League.

== Players ==
=== First-team squad ===
As of 12 September 2022

Note: Flags indicate national team as defined under FIFA eligibility rules; some limited exceptions apply. Players may hold more than one non-FIFA nationality.

No.	Pos.	Nation	Player
1	GK	ESP	Álex Remiro
2	DF	ESP	Álex Sola
3	MF	ESP	Martín Zubimendi
4	MF	ESP	Asier Illarramendi (captain)
5	MF	ESP	Igor Zubeldia
6	DF	ESP	Aritz Elustondo (3rd captain)
7	FW	ESP	Ander Barrenetxea
8	MF	ESP	Mikel Merino (4th captain)
9	FW	ESP	Carlos Fernández
10	FW	ESP	Mikel Oyarzabal (vice-captain)
11	FW	FRA	Momo Cho
12	DF	ESP	Aihen Muñoz
13	GK	ESP	Andoni Zubiaurre

No.	Pos.	Nation	Player
14	FW	JPN	Takefusa Kubo
15	DF	ESP	Diego Rico
16	MF	ESP	Ander Guevara
18	DF	ESP	Andoni Gorosabel
20	DF	ESP	Jon Pacheco
21	MF	ESP	David Silva
23	MF	ESP	Brais Méndez
24	DF	ESP	Robin Le Normand
25	FW	NGR	Umar Sadiq
27	MF	ESP	Beñat Turrientes
29	MF	ESP	Robert Navarro
30	MF	ESP	Urko González de Zárate
33	FW	ESP	Jon Karrikaburu

=== Reserve team ===
Note: Flags indicate national team as defined under FIFA eligibility rules; some limited exceptions apply. Players may hold more than one non-FIFA nationality.

No.	Pos.	Nation	Player
28	FW	ESP	Ander Martín
31	MF	ESP	Jon Ander Olasagasti
32	GK	ESP	Unai Marrero

=== Out on loan ===
Note: Flags indicate national team as defined under FIFA eligibility rules; some limited exceptions apply. Players may hold more than one non-FIFA nationality.

No.	Pos.	Nation	Player
—	GK	ESP	Gaizka Ayesa (at Numancia until 30 June 2023)
—	DF	ESP	Iñaki Recio (at Calahorra until 30 June 2023)
—	DF	ESP	Kerman Sukía (at Calahorra until 30 June 2023)
—	DF	FRA	Modibo Sagnan (at Utrecht until 30 June 2023)

No.	Pos.	Nation	Player
—	MF	SVK	Peter Pokorný (at Fehérvár until 30 June 2023)
—	MF	ESP	Portu (at Getafe until 30 June 2023)
—	MF	ESP	Roberto López (at Mirandés until 30 June 2023)

== Transfers ==
=== In ===
Date	Player	From	Type	Fee	Ref.
1 July 2022	(France) Mohamed-Ali Cho	(France) Angers	Transfer	€12M	
6 July 2022	(Spain) Brais Méndez	Celta Vigo	Transfer	€14M	
19 July 2022	(Japan) Takefusa Kubo	Real Madrid	Transfer	Undisclosed	
28 August 2022	(Norway) Alexander Sørloth	(Germany) RB Leipzig	Loan	Undisclosed	
31 August 2022	(Nigeria) Umar Sadiq	(Spain) Almería	Transfer	€20M	

=== Out ===
Date	Player	To	Type	Fee	Ref.
3 June 2022	(Brazil) Willian José	Real Betis	Buyout clause	€8.5M	
1 July 2022	(Belgium) Adnan Januzaj	Released			
1 July 2022	(Spain) Portu	Getafe	Loan		
1 July 2022	(Norway) Alexander Sørloth	(Germany) RB Leipzig	Loan return		
11 July 2022	(Spain) Jon Guridi	Alavés	Transfer	Free	
11 July 2022	(France) Modibo Sagnan	(Netherlands) Utrecht	Loan		
11 July 2022	(Spain) Joseba Zaldúa	Cádiz	Transfer	Free	
22 July 2022	(Spain) Jon Bautista	Eibar	Transfer	Free	
26 July 2022	(Spain) Julen Lobete	Celta Vigo	Transfer	Undisclosed	
2 August 2022	(France) Naïs Djouahra	(Croatia) Rijeka	Transfer	€750K	
9 August 2022	(Australia) Mathew Ryan	(Denmark) Copenhagen	Transfer	€5M	
26 August 2022	(Sweden) Alexander Isak	(England) Newcastle United	Transfer	€68M	

== Pre-season and friendlies ==
Win Draw Loss Fixtures

La Real announced that the team would start training on 7 July.

16 July 2022 Friendly	Real Sociedad (Spain)	0–1	(France) Toulouse	San Sebastián
19:00 CEST (UTC+2)		Report	Aboukhlal 76'	Stadium: Estadio Zubieta XXI; Attendance: 5,014; Referee: Daniel Palencia Caballero (Spain)

23 July 2022 Friendly	Borussia Mönchengladbach (Germany)	1–1	(Spain) Real Sociedad	Mönchengladbach, Germany
15:30 CEST (UTC+2)	Bensebaini 43' (pen.)	Report	Le Normand (yellow card) 43'; Karrikaburu 60'	Stadium: Borussia-Park; Attendance: 10,774; Referee: Robin Braun (Germany)

27 July 2022 Friendly	Real Sociedad (Spain)	1–0	(Spain) Osasuna	San Sebastián
19:00 CEST (UTC+1)	Aguirre 89'	Report		Stadium: Estadio Zubieta XXI; Attendance: 1,500; Referee: Ibai Rezola Etxeberria

30 July 2022 Friendly	Bournemouth (England)	1–2	(Spain) Real Sociedad	Bournemouth, England
15:00 BST (UTC+1)	Smith (yellow card) 55'; Stanislas 81'	Report	Merino 9'; Zubeldia 56'	Stadium: Dean Court; Referee: Michael Salisbury (England)

5 August 2022 Friendly	Real Sociedad (Spain)	1–2	(Spain) Eibar	San Sebastián
11:00 CEST (UTC+1)	Cho 66'	Report	Arbilla 47'; Bautista 60'	Stadium: Estadio Zubieta XXI; Referee: Dani Palencia

5 August 2022 EH Txapela	Athletic Bilbao (Spain)	1–0	(Spain) Real Sociedad	Barakaldo
20:45 CEST (UTC+2)	Vesga 22'	Report	Rico (yellow card) 52' (yellow-red card) 71'	Stadium: Estadio Lasesarre; Referee: Ricardo de Burgos Bengoetxea

10 December 2022 Friendly	Real Sociedad (Spain)	Cancelled	(Belgium) Anderlecht	San Sebastián
19:00 CET (UTC+1)				Stadium: Anoeta
Note: The match was cancelled due to the high number of injuries among Anderlecht players.

10 December 2022 Friendly	Real Sociedad (Spain)	1–1	(Spain) Rayo Vallecano	San Sebastián
12:00 CET (UTC+1)	Sørloth 8'	Report	Nteka 27'; Abdul Mumin (yellow card) 57'	Stadium: Anoeta; Referee: César Soto Grado

16 December 2022 Friendly	Leeds United (England)	2–1	(Spain) Real Sociedad	Leeds, England
19:45 GMT (UTC±0)	Struijk 16'; Roca (yellow card) 35'; Rodrigo 58'; Hjelde (yellow card) 60'	Report	Zubimendi 10'; Zubeldia (yellow card) 15'; Elustondo (yellow card) 90'	Stadium: Elland Road; Attendance: 22,826; Referee: Michael Sailsbury (England)

== Competitions ==
=== Overall record ===
Competition	First match	Last match	Starting round	Final position	Record							
Competition	First match	Last match	Starting round	Final position	Pld	W	D	L	GF	GA	GD	Win %
La Liga	14 August 2022	4 June 2023	Matchday 1	4th	38	21	8	9	51	35	+16	55.26
Copa del Rey	13 November 2022	25 January 2023	First round	Quarter-finals	5	4	0	1	11	2	+9	80.00
UEFA Europa League	8 September 2022	16 March 2023	Group stage	Round of 16	8	5	1	2	10	4	+6	62.50
Total					51	30	9	12	72	41	+31	58.82

Source: Soccerway

=== La Liga ===
==== League table ====
Pos	Team	Pld	W	D	L	GF	GA	GD	Pts	Qualification or relegation
2	Real Madrid	38	24	6	8	75	36	+39	78	Qualification for the Champions League group stage
3	Atlético Madrid	38	23	8	7	70	33	+37	77	Qualification for the Champions League group stage
4	Real Sociedad	38	21	8	9	51	35	+16	71	Qualification for the Champions League group stage
5	Villarreal	38	19	7	12	59	40	+19	64	Qualification for the Europa League group stage
6	Real Betis	38	17	9	12	46	41	+5	60	Qualification for the Europa League group stage

Source: LaLiga Santander
Rules for classification: 1) Points; 2) Head-to-head points; 3) Head-to-head goal difference; 4) Goal difference; 5) Goals scored; 6) Fair-play points (Note: Head-to-head record is used only after all the matches between the teams in question have been played)

==== Results summary ====
Overall								Home						Away					
Pld	W	D	L	GF	GA	GD	Pts	W	D	L	GF	GA	GD	W	D	L	GF	GA	GD
38	21	8	9	51	35	+16	71	11	5	3	26	16	+10	10	3	6	25	19	+6

Source: La Liga

==== Results by round ====
Round	1	2	3	4	5	6	7	8	9	10	11	12	13	14	15	16	17	18	19	20	21	22	23	24	25	26	27	28	29	30	31	32	33	34	35	36	37	38
Ground	A	H	A	H	A	H	A	H	A	H	A	H	H	A	H	A	H	A	A	H	A	H	A	H	A	H	A	H	A	H	A	A	H	H	A	H	A	H
Result	W	L	W	D	L	W	W	W	W	W	L	L	D	W	W	W	W	W	D	L	W	D	L	D	D	W	L	W	L	W	D	W	W	D	W	W	L	W
Position	6	11	8	9	11	8	7	6	5	3	4	5	6	3	3	3	3	3	3	3	3	3	3	4	4	4	4	4	4	4	4	4	4	4	4	4	4	4

Source: La Liga
A = Away; H = Home; W = Win; D = Draw; L = Loss

==== Matches ====
The league fixtures were announced on 23 June 2022.

14 August 2022 1	Cádiz	0–1	Real Sociedad	Cádiz
17:30 CEST (UTC+2)	Zaldúa (yellow card) 45'; Pérez (yellow card) 45+1'; Alejo (yellow card) 70'; Fali (yellow card) 85'	Report	Kubo 24'; Méndez (yellow card) 85'; Illarramendi (yellow card) 90+8'	Stadium: Nuevo Mirandilla; Attendance: 16,570; Referee: Isidro Díaz de Mera Escuderos

21 August 2022 2	Real Sociedad	1–4	Barcelona	San Sebastián
22:00 CEST (UTC+2)	Isak 6'; Elustondo (yellow card) 21'; Le Normand (yellow card) 41'	Report	Lewandowski 1', 68'; Araújo (yellow card) 51'; Dembélé 66'; Fati 79'	Stadium: Reale Arena; Attendance: 36,201; Referee: José Luis Munuera Montero

27 August 2022 3	Elche	0–1	Real Sociedad	Elche
17:30 CEST (UTC+2)	Gumbau (yellow card) 10'; Morente (yellow card) 30'; Mojica (yellow card) 79'	Report	Méndez 20'; Merino (penalty missed) 34', (yellow card) 45+2'; Zubeldia (yellow card) 49'; Karrikaburu (yellow card) 86'	Stadium: Martínez Valero; Attendance: 22,656; Referee: Javier Iglesias Villanueva

3 September 2022 4	Real Sociedad	1–1	Atlético Madrid	San Sebastián
18:30 CEST (UTC+2)	Zubimendi (yellow card) 28'; Cho (yellow card) 35'; Sadiq 55'; Zubeldia (yellow card) 57'; Gorosabel (yellow card) 72'; Merino (yellow card) 90+7'	Report	Morata 5', (yellow card) 61'; Saúl (yellow card) 12'; De Paul (yellow card) 24'; Llorente (yellow card) 35'	Stadium: Reale Arena; Attendance: 35,366; Referee: César Soto Grado

11 September 2022 5	Getafe	2–1	Real Sociedad	Getafe
18:30 CEST (UTC+2)	Mayoral (penalty missed) 14'; Aleñá (yellow card) 41', (goal) 48'; Ünal 45+5'; Iglesias (yellow card) 56'; Suárez (yellow card) 86'; Duarte (yellow card) 90+5'	Report	Méndez 50'; Gorosabel (yellow card) 74'	Stadium: Coliseum Alfonso Pérez; Attendance: 11,112; Referee: Juan Luis Pulido Santana

18 September 2022 6	Real Sociedad	2–1	Espanyol	San Sebastián
18:30 CEST (UTC+2)	Méndez 17', (yellow card) 82'; Sørloth 29', (yellow card) 88'; Elustondo (yellow card) 83'	Report	Expósito 19'	Stadium: Reale Arena; Attendance: 31,511; Referee: Carlos del Cerro Grande

2 October 2022 7	Girona	3–5	Real Sociedad	Girona
18:30 CEST (UTC+2)	Riquelme 23'; Arnau 27'; Castellanos 48', (yellow card) 90+4'; Romeu (yellow card) 57'; Gutiérrez (yellow card) 65'	Report	Sørloth 8', 42'; Méndez 66'; Zubimendi 71'; Kubo 85'; Merino (yellow card) 87'	Stadium: Estadi Montilivi; Attendance: 12,217; Referee: Mario Melero López

9 October 2022 8	Real Sociedad	1–0	Villarreal	San Sebastián
18:30 CEST (UTC+2)	Méndez 33', (yellow card) 68'; Silva (yellow card) 55'; Elustondo (yellow card) 75'; Sola (yellow card) 82'; Fernández (yellow card) 90+1'	Report	Lo Celso (yellow card) 44'; Albiol (yellow card) 65'; Torres (yellow card) 78'	Stadium: Reale Arena; Attendance: 32,689; Referee: César Soto Grado

16 October 2022 9	Celta Vigo	1–2	Real Sociedad	Vigo
14:00 CEST (UTC+2)	Aspas 39'; Larsen (yellow card) 45+8'; Mallo (yellow card) 49'; Pérez (yellow card) 77'; Mingueza (yellow card) 81'; Marchesín (yellow card) 90+2'; Paciência (red card) 90+4'	Report	Illarramendi (yellow card) 24', (goal) 30'; Le Normand (yellow card) 45'; Zubimendi (yellow card) 45+4'; Zubeldia 54', (yellow card) 69'; Silva (yellow card) 68'; Barrenetxea (yellow card) 89'; Navarro (yellow card) 90+3'	Stadium: Balaídos; Attendance: 13,101; Referee: Guillermo Cuadra Fernández

19 October 2022 10	Real Sociedad	1–0	Mallorca	San Sebastián
20:00 CEST (UTC+2)	Merino 4'; Guevara (yellow card) 51'	Report	Maffeo (yellow card) 63'; Grenier (yellow card) 81'	Stadium: Reale Arena; Attendance: 27,085; Referee: Miguel Ángel Ortiz Arias

22 October 2022 11	Valladolid	1–0	Real Sociedad	Valladolid
16:15 CEST (UTC+2)	J. Sánchez (yellow card) 6'; León 16'; Plano (yellow card) 51'	Report	Zubimendi (yellow card) 27'; Navarro (yellow card) 46'; Méndez (yellow card) 60'	Stadium: José Zorrilla; Attendance: 21,175; Referee: Jorge Figueroa Vázquez

30 October 2022 12	Real Sociedad	0–2	Real Betis	San Sebastián
21:00 CET (UTC+1)	Marín (yellow card) 35'; Le Normand (yellow card) 58'; Pacheco (yellow card) 76'; Merino (yellow card) 90+5'	Report	González (yellow card) 51'; Fekir (yellow card) 65'; Akouokou (yellow card) 84'; Cruz 86'; Iglesias 90+3'; Guardado (yellow card) 90+5'	Stadium: Reale Arena; Attendance: 32,435; Referee: Javier Iglesias Villanueva

6 November 2022 13	Real Sociedad	1–1	Valencia	San Sebastián
16:15 CET (UTC+1)	Rico (yellow card) 8'; Guillamón 10' (o.g.); Elustondo (red card) 17'; Zubimendi (yellow card) 90'	Report	Lino 25'	Stadium: Reale Arena; Attendance: 32,773; Referee: José Luis Munuera Montero

9 November 2022 14	Sevilla	1–2	Real Sociedad	Seville
19:00 CET (UTC+1)	Rakitić (red card) 28'; Nianzou (red card) 34'; Navas (yellow card) 34'; Torres (yellow card) 40'; Mir 44'	Report	Sørloth 20'; Méndez 36'; Zubeldia (yellow card) 46'; Pacheco (yellow card) 90'	Stadium: Ramón Sánchez Pizjuán; Attendance: 34,814; Referee: Carlos del Cerro Grande

31 December 2022 15	Real Sociedad	2–0	Osasuna	San Sebastián
16:15 CET (UTC+1)	Méndez 22', (yellow card) 68'; Sørloth 64'	Report	U. García (yellow card) 57'	Stadium: Reale Arena; Attendance: 34,847; Referee: Valentín Pizarro Gómez

8 January 2023 16	Almería	0–2	Real Sociedad	Almería
14:00 CET (UTC+1)	Babić (yellow card) 90+2'	Report	Silva 47'; Sørloth 53'	Stadium: Power Horse Stadium; Attendance: 12,020; Referee: Javier Alberola Rojas

14 January 2023 17	Real Sociedad	3–1	Athletic Bilbao	San Sebastián
21:00 CET (UTC+1)	Sørloth 25', (yellow card) 48'; Kubo 37', (yellow card) 38'; Zubeldia (yellow card) 52'; Oyarzabal 62' (pen.); Le Normand (yellow card) 83'; Zubimendi (yellow card) 90+3'	Report	Sancet 40'; D. García (yellow card) 43'; Yeray (red card) 60'; Vivian (yellow card) 60'	Stadium: Reale Arena; Attendance: 38,229; Referee: Guillermo Cuadra Fernández

21 January 2023 18	Rayo Vallecano	0–2	Real Sociedad	Madrid
14:00 CET (UTC+1)		Report	Sørloth 15'; Barrenetxea 36'	Stadium: Campo de Fútbol de Vallecas; Attendance: 12,874; Referee: Antonio Mateu Lahoz

29 January 2023 19	Real Madrid	0–0	Real Sociedad	Madrid
21:00 CET (UTC+1)	Nacho (yellow card) 41'	Report	Zubimendi (yellow card) 27'; Elustondo (yellow card) 65'; Kubo (yellow card) 68'; Remiro (yellow card) 90+4'	Stadium: Santiago Bernabéu; Attendance: 58,123; Referee: Mario Melero López

5 February 2023 20	Real Sociedad	0–1	Valladolid	San Sebastián
18:30 CET (UTC+1)	Rico (yellow card) 24'; Barrenetxea (yellow card) 45'; Illarramendi (yellow card) 69'; Fernández (yellow card) 90+5'	Report	Sánchez (yellow card) 27'; Olaza (yellow card) 31'; Plano (yellow card) 38'; Hongla (yellow card) 40'; Larin 73', (yellow card) 90+2'	Stadium: Reale Arena; Attendance: 32,208; Referee: Pablo González Fuertes

13 February 2023 21	Espanyol	2–3	Real Sociedad	Cornellà de Llobregat
21:00 CET (UTC+1)	Gil (yellow card) 18'; Braithwaite (yellow card) 57'; Darder 74'; Cabrera (yellow card) 80' (yellow-red card) 90+4'; Oliván 87'	Report	Kubo 23'; Sørloth 51'; Cabrera 63' (o.g.); Fernández (yellow card) 90+7'	Stadium: RCDE Stadium; Attendance: 15,732; Referee: Alejandro Muñiz Ruiz

18 February 2023 22	Real Sociedad	1–1	Celta Vigo	San Sebastián
14:00 CET (UTC+1)	Oyarzabal 5'; Zubimendi (yellow card) 47'; Sørloth (yellow card) 59'; Barrenetxea (yellow card) 62'	Report	Pérez (yellow card) 55'; Núñez (yellow card) 59'; Tapia (yellow card) 74' (yellow-red card) 75'; Seferovic (yellow card) 90+1'; Le Normand 90+3' (o.g.)	Stadium: Reale Arena; Attendance: 29,312; Referee: Miguel Ángel Ortiz Arias

25 February 2023 23	Valencia	1–0	Real Sociedad	Valencia
21:00 CET (UTC+1)	Foulquier (yellow card) 11'; Zubeldia 40' (o.g.); Musah (yellow card) 45'; Castillejo (yellow card) 55'; Lato (yellow card) 67'; Mamardashvili (yellow card) 69'; Gabriel (yellow card) 90+7'	Report	Zubimendi (yellow card) 4'; Rico (yellow card) 36'; Fernández (yellow card) 90+8'	Stadium: Mestalla; Attendance: 37,465; Referee: Alejandro Hernández Hernández

3 March 2023 24	Real Sociedad	0–0	Cádiz	San Sebastián
21:00 CET (UTC+1)		Report	San Emeterio (yellow card) 53'	Stadium: Reale Arena; Attendance: 28,733; Referee: Antonio Mateu Lahoz

12 March 2023 25	Mallorca	1–1	Real Sociedad	Palma
14:00 CET (UTC+1)	Rodríguez (yellow card) 11'; Lee 50'; González (yellow card) 79'	Report	Fernández 3', (yellow card) 41'; Merino (red card) 90'; Sørloth (yellow card) 90+5'	Stadium: Visit Mallorca Stadium; Attendance: 13,840; Referee: Juan Martínez Munuera

19 March 2023 26	Real Sociedad	2–0	Elche	San Sebastián
16:15 CET (UTC+1)	Méndez (yellow card) 31'; Kubo 48'; Zubimendi (yellow card) 76'; Barrenetxea 90'	Report	Boyé (yellow card) 83'	Stadium: Reale Arena; Attendance: 28,496; Referee: José María Sánchez Martínez

2 April 2023 27	Villarreal	2–0	Real Sociedad	Villarreal
18:30 CEST (UTC+2)	Terrats (yellow card) 26'; Reina (yellow card) 53'; Foyth (yellow card) 65'; Parejo 77' (pen.); Jackson 81', (yellow card) 82' (yellow-red card) 90+1'	Report	Zubeldia (yellow card) 27'; Zubimendi (yellow card) 75'; Silva (yellow card) 76'	Stadium: Estadio de la Cerámica; Attendance: 18,768; Referee: Jesús Gil Manzano

8 April 2023 28	Real Sociedad	2–0	Getafe	San Sebastián
18:30 CEST (UTC+2)	Guevara (yellow card) 5'; Oyarzabal (penalty missed) 44', 45+2'; Kubo 60'; Illarramendi (yellow card) 79'	Report	Milla (yellow card) 20'	Stadium: Reale Arena; Attendance: 27,606; Referee: Mario Melero López

15 April 2023 29	Athletic Bilbao	2–0	Real Sociedad	Bilbao
16:15 CEST (UTC+2)	I. Williams 33', 70'; Capa (yellow card) 39'; Guruzeta (yellow card) 45+3'; D. García (yellow card) 47'; Yeray (yellow card) 80'; Vivian (yellow card) 83'	Report	Zubeldia (yellow card) 51'; Le Normand (yellow card) 65'	Stadium: San Mamés; Attendance: 49,287; Referee: César Soto Grado

22 April 2023 30	Real Sociedad	2–1	Rayo Vallecano	San Sebastián
18:30 CEST (UTC+2)	Sørloth 59'; Lejeune 81' (o.g.); Muñoz (yellow card) 90+2'	Report	Palazón 57'; Valentín (yellow card) 68'; Comesaña (yellow card) 72'	Stadium: Reale Arena; Attendance: 32,054; Referee: Alejandro Muñiz Ruiz

25 April 2023 31	Real Betis	0–0	Real Sociedad	Seville
22:00 CEST (UTC+2)	Rodríguez (yellow card) 56'	Report	Zubimendi (yellow card) 38'; Muñoz (yellow card) 58'; Zubeldia (yellow card) 59'	Stadium: Benito Villamarín; Attendance: 42,294; Referee: Juan Martínez Munuera

28 April 2023 32	Osasuna	0–2	Real Sociedad	Pamplona
21:00 CEST (UTC+2)	Cruz (yellow card) 67'; Sánchez (yellow card) 83'; Moncayola (yellow card) 89'	Report	Herrera 6' (o.g.); Zubeldia (yellow card) 88'; Kubo 90'	Stadium: El Sadar; Attendance: 21,570; Referee: Valentín Pizarro Gómez

2 May 2023 33	Real Sociedad	2–0	Real Madrid	San Sebastián
22:00 CEST (UTC+2)	Gorosabel (yellow card) 22'; Kubo 47'; Barrenetxea 85'	Report	Carvajal (yellow card) 53' (yellow-red card) 61'; Ceballos (yellow card) 79'; Nacho (yellow card) 87'; Rodrygo (yellow card) 90+2'	Stadium: Reale Arena; Attendance: 35,314; Referee: Juan Luis Pulido Santana

13 May 2023 34	Real Sociedad	2–2	Girona	San Sebastián
14:00 CEST (UTC+2)	Oyarzabal 5', (yellow card) 62'; Zubeldia (yellow card) 11'; Silva 47', (yellow card) 90+6'; Le Normand (yellow card) 38'; Barrenetxea (yellow card) 78'; Zubimendi (yellow card) 90+5'	Report	Couto 37'; Stuani 45+3'; Romeu (yellow card) 49' (yellow-red card) 87'; Martínez (yellow card) 55'	Stadium: Reale Arena; Attendance: 30,027; Referee: Jorge Figueroa Vázquez

20 May 2023 35	Barcelona	1–2	Real Sociedad	Barcelona
21:00 CEST (UTC+2)	Lewandowski (yellow card) 53', (goal) 90'; Busquets (yellow card) 72'; Alonso (yellow card) 79'; De Jong (yellow card) 85'	Report	Merino 5'; Zubeldia (yellow card) 8'; Illarramendi (yellow card) 37'; Sørloth 72'; Kubo (yellow card) 79'; Fernández (yellow card) 85'	Stadium: Camp Nou; Attendance: 88,049; Referee: Javier Alberola Rojas

23 May 2023 36	Real Sociedad	1–0	Almería	San Sebastián
19:30 CEST (UTC+2)	Kubo 45+4'	Report	Suárez (red card) 36'; Eguaras (yellow card) 88'	Stadium: Reale Arena; Attendance: 31,574; Referee: Pablo González Fuertes

28 May 2023 37	Atlético Madrid	2–1	Real Sociedad	Madrid
19:00 CEST (UTC+2)	Griezmann 37'; De Paul (yellow card) 59'; Hermoso (yellow card) 63'; Molina 73'	Report	Merino (yellow card) 27'; Elustondo (yellow card) 54'; Sørloth 88'	Stadium: Cívitas Metropolitano; Attendance: 56,169; Referee: Juan Luis Pulido Santana

4 June 2023 38	Real Sociedad	2–1	Sevilla	San Sebastián
18:30 CEST (UTC+2)	Méndez 28'; Cho 73'	Report	Hormigo (yellow card) 45'; Lamela 77'	Stadium: Reale Arena; Attendance: 35,065; Referee: Carlos del Cerro Grande

=== Copa del Rey ===
13 November 2022 First round	Cazalegas	1–4	Real Sociedad	Talavera de la Reina
19:00 CET (UTC+1)	Rivera 68'	Report	Navarro 2'; Sørloth 76', 78'; Merino 80'	Stadium: El Prado; Referee: Mario Melero López

21 December 2022 Second round	Coria	0–5	Real Sociedad	Coria
21:00 CET (UTC+1)	Joserra (yellow card) 29'; Melli (red card) 74'	Report	Navarro 5'; Cho 17'; Méndez 45+1' (pen.); Karrikaburu 79', 84'	Stadium: La Isla; Attendance: 4,389; Referee: Alejandro Muñiz Ruiz

4 January 2023 Round of 32	UD Logroñés	0–1	Real Sociedad	Logroño
19:00 CET (UTC+1)	Sáenz (yellow card) 46'; Doncel (yellow card) 72'	Report	Navarro 33'; Muñoz (yellow card) 52'; Sørloth (yellow card) 74'	Stadium: Las Gaunas; Attendance: 15,000; Referee: Pablo González Fuertes

17 January 2023 Round of 16	Real Sociedad	1–0	Mallorca	San Sebastián
19:00 CET (UTC+1)	Navarro 5'; Méndez (yellow card) 26'; Pacheco (yellow card) 53'; Le Normand (yellow card) 78'	Report	Cufré (yellow card) 41'; González (yellow card) 52'; Copete (yellow card) 90+1'	Stadium: Reale Arena; Attendance: 23,408; Referee: Alejandro Hernández Hernández

25 January 2023 Quarter-finals	Barcelona	1–0	Real Sociedad	Barcelona
21:00 CET (UTC+1)	Dembélé 52'; Busquets (yellow card) 56'; Pedri (yellow card) 59'	Report	Méndez (red card) 40'; Zubimendi (yellow card) 66'	Stadium: Camp Nou; Attendance: 59,610; Referee: Jesús Gil Manzano

=== UEFA Europa League ===
==== Group stage ====
The draw for the group stage was held on 26 August 2022.

Pos	Team	Pld	W	D	L	GF	GA	GD	Pts	Qualification	RSO	MUN	SHE	OMO
1	(Spain) Real Sociedad	6	5	0	1	10	2	+8	15 (Note: Tied on head-to-head results. Overall goal difference is used as the tiebreaker.)	Advance to round of 16	—	0–1	3–0	2–1
2	(England) Manchester United	6	5	0	1	10	3	+7	15	Advance to knockout round play-offs	0–1	—	3–0	1–0
3	(Moldova) Sheriff Tiraspol	6	2	0	4	4	10	−6	6	Transfer to Europa Conference League	0–2	0–2	—	1–0
4	(Cyprus) Omonia	6	0	0	6	3	12	−9	0		0–2	2–3	0–3	—

Source: UEFA
Rules for classification: Group stage tiebreakers
Notes:

8 September 2022 1	Manchester United (England)	0–1	(Spain) Real Sociedad	Manchester, England
20:00 BST (UTC+1)	Martínez (yellow card) 57'; Fred (yellow card) 83'; De Gea (yellow card) 90+4'	Report	Méndez 59' (pen.); Silva (yellow card) 60'; Muñoz (yellow card) 70'; Turrientes (yellow card) 89'	Stadium: Old Trafford; Attendance: 74,310; Referee: Marco Di Bello (Italy)

15 September 2022 2	Real Sociedad (Spain)	2–1	(Cyprus) Omonia	San Sebastián
18:45 CEST (UTC+2)	Guevara 30'; Sørloth 80'; Zubeldia (yellow card) 87'	Report	Diskerud (yellow card) 2'; Bruno 72'; Bachirou (yellow card) 83'; Lang (yellow card) 90+2'	Stadium: Reale Arena; Attendance: 28,587; Referee: Kristo Tohver (Estonia)

6 October 2022 3	Sheriff Tiraspol (Moldova)	0–2	(Spain) Real Sociedad	Chișinău, Moldova
19:45 EEST (UTC+3)	Kyabou (yellow card) 17' (yellow-red card) 61'; Atiemwen (yellow card) 31'	Report	Sola (yellow card) 29'; Silva 53'; Elustondo 62'	Stadium: Zimbru Stadium; Attendance: 5,427; Referee: Harald Lechner (Austria)
Note: The match was played at the Zimbru Stadium in Chișinău, instead of Sheriff's regular stadium, the Sheriff Stadium in Tiraspol, due to Transnistria's involvement in the Russian invasion of Ukraine.

13 October 2022 4	Real Sociedad (Spain)	3–0	(Moldova) Sheriff Tiraspol	San Sebastián
21:00 CEST (UTC+2)	Sørloth 45+1'; Rico (yellow card) 37', (goal) 66'; Navarro 81'	Report	Mudasiru (yellow card) 14'; Zohouri (yellow card) 25' (yellow-red card) 33'	Stadium: Reale Arena; Attendance: 25,806; Referee: Enea Jorgji (Albania)

27 October 2022 5	Omonia (Cyprus)	0–2	(Spain) Real Sociedad	Nicosia, Cyprus
22:00 EEST (UTC+3)	Lang (yellow card) 50'; Papoulis (yellow card) 53'; Cassamá (yellow card) 88'	Report	Navarro 45+2'; Méndez 60', (yellow card) 84'; Illarramendi (yellow card) 73'	Stadium: GSP Stadium; Attendance: 11,780; Referee: Tamás Bognár (Hungary)

3 November 2022 6	Real Sociedad (Spain)	0–1	(England) Manchester United	San Sebastián
18:45 CET (UTC+1)	Méndez (yellow card) 64'; Fernández (yellow card) 73'	Report	Garnacho 17'; Martínez (yellow card) 62'; Ronaldo (yellow card) 71'; Dalot (yellow card) 87'	Stadium: Reale Arena; Attendance: 36,744; Referee: Georgi Kabakov (Bulgaria)

==== Knockout phase ====
===== Round of 16 =====
The draw for the round of 16 was held on 24 February 2023.

9 March 2023 First leg	Roma (Italy)	2–0	(Spain) Real Sociedad	Rome, Italy
18:45 CET (UTC+1)	El Shaarawy 13'; Kumbulla 87'; Matić (yellow card) 90+4'	Report	Illarramendi (yellow card) 69'; Zubeldia (yellow card) 71'; Gorosabel (yellow card) 80'; Zubimendi (yellow card) 85'; Oyarzabal (yellow card) 90+4'	Stadium: Stadio Olimpico; Attendance: 61,608; Referee: Sandro Schärer (Switzerland)

16 March 2023 Second leg	Real Sociedad (Spain)	0–0 (0–2 agg.)	(Italy) Roma	San Sebastián
21:00 CET (UTC+1)	Zubeldia (yellow card) 13'; Rico (yellow card) 39'; Fernández (yellow card) 87' (yellow-red card) 90+8'	Report	Karsdorp (yellow card) 6'; Mancini (yellow card) 17'; Smalling (yellow card) 90+8'	Stadium: Reale Arena; Attendance: 35,054; Referee: István Kovács (Romania)

== Statistics ==
=== Squad statistics ===
Last updated on 4 June 2023.

No.	Pos	Nat	Player	Total		La Liga		Copa del Rey		UEFA Europa League	
No.	Pos	Nat	Player	Apps	Goals	Apps	Goals	Apps	Goals	Apps	Goals
Goalkeepers
1	GK	(Spain) ESP	Álex Remiro	50	0	38	0	4	0	8	0
13	GK	(Spain) ESP	Andoni Zubiaurre	1	0	0	0	1	0	0	0
Defenders
2	DF	(Spain) ESP	Álex Sola	16	0	3+7	0	1	0	2+3	0
6	DF	(Spain) ESP	Aritz Elustondo	36	1	16+9	0	3+2	0	5+1	1
12	DF	(Spain) ESP	Aihen Muñoz	27	0	20+3	0	2+1	0	1	0
15	DF	(Spain) ESP	Diego Rico	31	1	18+2	0	3+1	0	7	1
18	DF	(Spain) ESP	Andoni Gorosabel	35	0	19+8	0	2+1	0	4+1	0
20	DF	(Spain) ESP	Jon Pacheco	25	0	12+5	0	2+1	0	5	0
24	DF	(Spain) ESP	Robin Le Normand	41	0	31+2	0	4	0	4	0
26	DF	(Spain) ESP	Aritz Arambarri	3	0	0	0	0	0	0+3	0
30	DF	(Spain) ESP	Urko González	1	0	0	0	0	0	0+1	0
Midfielders
3	MF	(Spain) ESP	Martín Zubimendi	44	1	35+1	1	3+1	0	4	0
4	MF	(Spain) ESP	Asier Illarramendi	31	1	13+11	1	2+1	0	3+1	0
5	MF	(Spain) ESP	Igor Zubeldia	39	1	29+2	1	3	0	4+1	0
8	MF	(Spain) ESP	Mikel Merino	43	3	28+5	2	2+1	1	7	0
16	MF	(Spain) ESP	Ander Guevara	16	1	2+6	0	2+1	0	4+1	1
21	MF	(Spain) ESP	David Silva	34	3	25+3	2	1	0	5	1
23	MF	(Spain) ESP	Brais Méndez	47	11	28+6	8	4+1	1	6+2	2
27	MF	(Spain) ESP	Beñat Turrientes	13	0	1+5	0	1	0	1+5	0
29	MF	(Spain) ESP	Robert Navarro	26	6	1+16	0	4+1	4	1+3	2
34	MF	(Spain) ESP	Jon Magunazelaia	5	0	0+2	0	0+1	0	0+2	0
42	MF	(Spain) ESP	Pablo Marín	17	0	3+7	0	2+3	0	1+1	0
46	MF	(Spain) ESP	Jon Ander Olasagasti	4	0	0+3	0	0+1	0	0	0
Forwards
7	FW	(Spain) ESP	Ander Barrenetxea	25	3	9+14	3	0+1	0	0+1	0
9	FW	(Spain) ESP	Carlos Fernández	30	1	8+16	1	0+2	0	2+2	0
10	FW	(Spain) ESP	Mikel Oyarzabal	28	4	14+9	4	2+1	0	1+1	0
11	FW	(France) FRA	Momo Cho	24	2	5+14	1	1	1	1+3	0
14	FW	(Japan) JPN	Takefusa Kubo	43	9	28+6	9	1+1	0	4+3	0
19	FW	(Norway) NOR	Alexander Sørloth	30	16	18	12	4+1	2	5+2	2
25	FW	(Nigeria) NGR	Umar Sadiq	3	1	1+1	1	0	0	1	0
28	FW	(Spain) ESP	Ander Martín	4	0	0+3	0	0+1	0	0	0
Players who have made an appearance this season but have left the club
33	FW	(Spain) ESP	Jon Karrikaburu	12	2	0+6	0	1+1	2	2+2	0

=== Goalscorers ===
Rank	Pos	No.	Nat.	Player	La Liga	Copa del Rey	Europa League	Total
1	MF	23	(Spain)	Brais Méndez	7	0	1	6
2	FW	19	(Norway)	Alexander Sørloth	10	0	1	4
3	MF	14	(Japan)	Takefusa Kubo	8	0	0	2
4	FW	25	(Nigeria)	Umar Sadiq	1	0	0	1
4	FW	19	(Sweden)	Alexander Isak	1	0	0	1
Own goals					0			
Totals					5	0	0	6

Last updated: 12 September 2022

=== Clean sheets ===
As of 11 October 2022.

Rank	Player	Matches played	La Liga	Copa del Rey	Europa League	Total
1	(Spain) Álex Remiro	11	3	0	2	5
2	(Spain) Andoni Zubiaurre	0				
Total		11	3	0	2	5

=== Disciplinary record ===
Includes all competitive matches. Players listed below made at least one appearance for Real Sociedad first squad during the season.

N	P	Nat.	Name	La Liga			Europa League			Total			Notes
N	P	Nat.	Name	Yellow card	Second yellow card	Red card	Yellow card	Second yellow card	Red card	Yellow card	Second yellow card	Red card	Notes
18	DF	(Spain)	Andoni Gorosabel	2						2			
8	MF	(Spain)	Mikel Merino	2						2			
5	MF	(Spain)	Igor Zubeldia	2						2			
23	MF	(Spain)	Brais Méndez	1						1			
4	MF	(Spain)	Asier Illarramendi	1						1			
6	DF	(Spain)	Aritz Elustondo	1						1			
24	DF	(Spain)	Robin Le Normand	1						1			
33	FW	(Spain)	Jon Karrikaburu	1						1			
3	MF	(Spain)	Martín Zubimendi	1						1			
11	MF	(France)	Momo Cho	1						1			
21	MF	(Spain)	David Silva				1			1			
12	DF	(Spain)	Aihen Muñoz				1			1			
27	MF	(Spain)	Beñat Turrientes				1			1			

Source: Matches
Ordered by (red card) , (second yellow card) and (yellow card)
(yellow card) = Number of bookings; (second yellow card) = Number of sending offs after a second yellow card; (red card) = Number of sending offs by a direct red card.
