= 2021–22 Real Sociedad season =

Real Sociedad
2021–22 season
- President: Jokin Aperribay
- Head coach: Imanol Alguacil
- Stadium: Anoeta Stadium
- La Liga: 6th
- Copa del Rey: Quarter-finals
- UEFA Europa League: Knockout round play-offs
- Top goalscorer: League: Mikel Oyarzabal (9); All: Mikel Oyarzabal (15)
- Highest home attendance: 37,066 vs Athletic Bilbao
- Lowest home attendance: 7,652 vs Rayo Vallecano
- Biggest win: Real Sociedad 3–0 PSV Eindhoven; Zamora 0–3 Real Sociedad
- Biggest defeat: Real Betis 4–0 Real Sociedad; Athletic Bilbao 4–0 Real Sociedad
Home colours	Away colours	Third colours

The 2021–22 season was the 112th season in the existence of Real Sociedad and the club's 12th consecutive season in the top flight of Spanish football. In addition to the domestic league, Real Sociedad participated in this season's editions of the Copa del Rey and the UEFA Europa League.

== Players ==
=== First-team squad ===
As of 1 January 2022

Note: Flags indicate national team as defined under FIFA eligibility rules; some limited exceptions apply. Players may hold more than one non-FIFA nationality.

No.	Pos.	Nation	Player
1	GK	ESP	Álex Remiro
2	DF	ESP	Joseba Zaldúa
3	MF	ESP	Martín Zubimendi
4	MF	ESP	Asier Illarramendi (Captain)
5	MF	ESP	Igor Zubeldia
6	DF	ESP	Aritz Elustondo (3rd captain)
7	MF	ESP	Portu
8	MF	ESP	Mikel Merino
9	FW	ESP	Carlos Fernández
10	FW	ESP	Mikel Oyarzabal (vice-captain)
11	MF	BEL	Adnan Januzaj
12	DF	ESP	Aihen Muñoz
13	GK	AUS	Mathew Ryan

No.	Pos.	Nation	Player
14	MF	ESP	Jon Guridi
15	DF	ESP	Diego Rico
16	MF	ESP	Ander Guevara
17	MF	BRA	Rafinha (on loan from Paris Saint-Germain)
18	DF	ESP	Andoni Gorosabel
19	FW	SWE	Alexander Isak
20	DF	ESP	Nacho Monreal
21	MF	ESP	David Silva
22	FW	ESP	Ander Barrenetxea
23	FW	NOR	Alexander Sørloth (on loan from RB Leipzig)
24	DF	FRA	Robin Le Normand
26	DF	ESP	Jon Pacheco
29	MF	ESP	Robert Navarro

=== Reserve team ===
Note: Flags indicate national team as defined under FIFA eligibility rules; some limited exceptions apply. Players may hold more than one non-FIFA nationality.

No.	Pos.	Nation	Player
27	MF	ESP	Beñat Turrientes
28	MF	ESP	Roberto López
30	MF	SVK	Peter Pokorný

No.	Pos.	Nation	Player
33	DF	ESP	Aritz Arambarri
34	GK	ESP	Gaizka Ayesa
35	FW	ESP	Julen Lobete

=== Out on loan ===
Note: Flags indicate national team as defined under FIFA eligibility rules; some limited exceptions apply. Players may hold more than one non-FIFA nationality.

No.	Pos.	Nation	Player
—	DF	POR	Kévin Rodrigues (at Rayo Vallecano until 30 June 2022)
—	MF	ESP	Martín Merquelanz (at Rayo Vallecano until 30 June 2022)

No.	Pos.	Nation	Player
—	FW	ESP	Peru Ruiz (at Örgryte IS until 31 December 2021)

== Transfers ==
=== In ===
Date	Player	From	Type	Fee	Ref
30 June 2021	(France) Naïs Djouahra	Mirandés	Loan return		
30 June 2021	(Brazil) Willian José	(England) Wolverhampton Wanderers	Loan return		
30 June 2021	(Portugal) Kévin Rodrigues	Eibar	Loan return		
30 June 2021	(Slovakia) Peter Pokorný	(Austria) Red Bull Salzburg	Transfer	Undisclosed	
30 June 2021	(Spain) Andoni Zubiaurre	Cultural Leonesa	Loan return		
12 July 2021	(Australia) Mathew Ryan	(England) Brighton & Hove Albion	Transfer	Undisclosed	
25 August 2021	(Norway) Alexander Sørloth	(Germany) RB Leipzig	Loan		
26 July 2021	(Spain) Diego Rico	(England) Bournemouth	Transfer	Undisclosed	
27 December 2021	(Brazil) Rafinha	(France) Paris Saint-Germain F.C.	Loan		

=== Out ===
Date	Player	To	Type	Fee	Ref
8 August 2021	(Portugal) Kévin Rodrigues	Rayo Vallecano	Loan		
10 August 2021	(Spain) Martín Merquelanz	Rayo Vallecano	Loan		
26 August 2021	(Spain) Jon Bautista	Leganés	Loan		
26 August 2021	(Brazil) Willian José	Real Betis	Loan		
31 August 2021	(France) Modibo Sagnan	(Portugal) Tondela	Loan		

== Pre-season and friendlies ==
Win Draw Loss Fixtures

17 July 2021 Friendly	Real Sociedad (Spain)	6–1	(Spain) Huesca	Lasarte-Oria, Spain
19:00 CEST (UTC+2)	Guridi 2'; Januzaj 7'; Fernández 33'; Willian José 72'; Navarro 83'; Le Normand 87'	Report	Escriche 35'	Stadium: Zubieta Facilities; Attendance: 0 Referee: Aitor Gorostegui Fernández-Ortega

24 July 2021 Friendly	Real Sociedad (Spain)	3–1	(Spain) Alavés	San Sebastián, Spain
19:00 CEST (UTC+2)	Januzaj 8'; Pacheco 43'; Zubeldia 69'	Report	Pérez 16' (pen.)	Stadium: Anoeta; Referee: Daniel Palencia Caballero

28 July 2021 Friendly	Real Sociedad (Spain)	2–1	(France) Monaco	San Sebastián, Spain
18:00 CEST (UTC+2)	Januzaj 5'; Willian José 69'	Report	Golovin 42'	Stadium: Anoeta; Referee: Gorka Sagués Oskoz

31 July 2021 Friendly	AZ (Netherlands)	1–0	(Spain) Real Sociedad	Alkmaar, Netherlands
17:00 CEST (UTC+2)	Aboukhlal 33'	Report		Stadium: AFAS Stadion; Referee: Marc Nagtegaal

6 August 2021 Friendly	Real Sociedad (Spain)	3–1	(Spain) Eibar	Lasarte-Oria, Spain
11:00 CEST (UTC+2)	Isak 38'; Illarramendi (yellow card) 41'; Januzaj 67'; Zaldúa 89'	Report	Corpas 31'	Stadium: Zubieta Facilities; Referee: Ekaitz García Arriola

6 August 2021 Euskal Herriko Txapela	Real Sociedad (Spain)	1–3	(Spain) Osasuna	Lasarte-Oria, Spain
20:30 CEST (UTC+2)	Willian José 55'	Report	Budimir 32', 65'; Grau 78'	Stadium: Zubieta Facilities; Attendance: 1,000; Referee: Aimar Velasco Arbaiza

== Competitions ==
=== Overall record ===
Competition	First match	Last match	Starting round	Final position	Record							
Competition	First match	Last match	Starting round	Final position	Pld	W	D	L	GF	GA	GD	Win %
La Liga	15 August 2021	22 May 2022	Matchday 1	6th	38	17	11	10	40	37	+3	44.74
Copa del Rey	1 December 2021	3 February 2022	First round	Quarter-finals	5	4	0	1	12	6	+6	80.00
UEFA Europa League	16 September 2021	24 February 2022	Group stage	Knockout round play-offs	8	2	4	2	12	11	+1	25.00
Total					51	23	15	13	64	54	+10	45.10

Source: Soccerway

=== La Liga ===
==== League table ====
Pos	Team	Pld	W	D	L	GF	GA	GD	Pts	Qualification or relegation
4	Sevilla	38	18	16	4	53	30	+23	70	Qualification for the Champions League group stage
5	Real Betis	38	19	8	11	62	40	+22	65	Qualification for the Europa League group stage (Note: Since the winners of the 2021–22 Copa del Rey, Real Betis, qualified for European competition based on league position, the Europa League berth awarded to the Copa del Rey winners was passed to the sixth-placed team, and the Europa Conference League berth awarded to the sixth-placed team was passed to the seventh-placed team.)
6	Real Sociedad	38	17	11	10	40	37	+3	62	Qualification for the Europa League group stage
7	Villarreal	38	16	11	11	63	37	+26	59	Qualification for the Europa Conference League play-off round
8	Athletic Bilbao	38	14	13	11	43	36	+7	55	

Source: LaLiga Santander
Rules for classification: 1) Points; 2) Head-to-head points; 3) Head-to-head goal difference; 4) Goal difference; 5) Goals scored; 6) Fair-play points (Note: Head-to-head record is used only after all the matches between the teams in question have been played)

==== Results summary ====
Overall								Home						Away					
Pld	W	D	L	GF	GA	GD	Pts	W	D	L	GF	GA	GD	W	D	L	GF	GA	GD
38	17	11	10	40	37	+3	62	10	5	4	16	9	+7	7	6	6	24	28	−4

Source: La Liga

==== Results by round ====
Round	1	2	3	4	5	6	7	8	9	10	11	12	13	14	15	16	17	18	19	20	21	22	23	24	25	26	27	28	29	30	31	32	33	34	35	36	37	38
Ground	A	H	H	A	H	A	H	A	H	A	A	H	A	H	A	H	A	H	A	H	A	H	A	H	A	H	A	H	A	H	A	H	H	A	A	H	A	H
Result	L	W	W	W	D	W	W	D	W	D	W	D	W	D	L	L	L	L	D	W	W	D	D	W	L	W	L	W	D	W	W	D	L	D	L	W	W	L
Position	18	7	7	4	4	3	2	3	1	1	1	1	1	2	3	5	6	6	7	5	5	5	7	6	7	6	6	6	6	6	6	6	6	6	6	6	6	6

Source: La Liga
A = Away; H = Home; W = Win; D = Draw; L = Loss

==== Matches ====
The league fixtures were announced on 30 June 2021.

15 August 2021 1	Barcelona	4–2	Real Sociedad	Barcelona
20:00 CEST (UTC+2)	Piqué 19'; Braithwaite 45+2', 59'; Busquets (yellow card) 57'; González (yellow card) 84'; Roberto 90+1'	Report	Zubimendi (yellow card) 37'; Elustondo (yellow card) 61'; Muñoz (yellow card) 62'; Le Normand (yellow card) 78'; Lobete 82'; Oyarzabal 85'	Stadium: Camp Nou; Attendance: 20,384; Referee: Alejandro Hernández Hernández

22 August 2021 2	Real Sociedad	1–0	Rayo Vallecano	San Sebastián
17:00 CEST (UTC+2)	Oyarzabal 68' (pen.); Isak (yellow card) 86'; Pacheco (yellow card) 90'; Le Normand (yellow card) 90+5'	Report	Trejo (yellow card) 26'; Comesaña (yellow card) 55'; Balliu (yellow card) 66'; F. García (yellow card) 90+1'	Stadium: Anoeta; Attendance: 7,652; Referee: Santiago Jaime Latre

28 August 2021 3	Real Sociedad	1–0	Levante	San Sebastián
19:30 CEST (UTC+2)	Barrenetxea 42'; Gorosabel (yellow card) 84'	Report	Cantero (yellow card) 18'	Stadium: Anoeta; Attendance: 7,758; Referee: José Luis Munuera Montero

12 September 2021 4	Cádiz	0–2	Real Sociedad	Cádiz
18:30 CEST (UTC+2)	Negredo (yellow card) 17'; Espino (yellow card) 42'; Cala (yellow card) 55' (yellow-red card) 83'	Report	Oyarzabal 71', 84' (pen.)	Stadium: Nuevo Mirandilla; Attendance: 11,826; Referee: Alejandro Muñiz Ruiz

19 September 2021 5	Real Sociedad	0–0	Sevilla	San Sebastián
16:15 CEST (UTC+2)	Oyarzabal (penalty missed) 27'; Muñoz (yellow card) 61'; Januzaj (yellow card) 72'	Report	Rakitić (yellow card) 20'; Lamela (yellow card) 45+2'; Óscar (yellow card) 82'	Stadium: Anoeta; Attendance: 23,757; Referee: Antonio Mateu Lahoz

23 September 2021 6	Granada	2–3	Real Sociedad	Granada
19:30 CEST (UTC+2)	Germán 9', (yellow card) 72'; Suárez (yellow card) 28'; Rochina (yellow card) 36'; Duarte (yellow card) 50'; Arias (yellow card) 64'; Milla 70' (pen.)	Report	Elustondo 52', 82'; Merino 60'; Le Normand (yellow card) 72'	Stadium: Nuevo Los Cármenes; Attendance: 9,552; Referee: Valentín Pizarro Gómez

26 September 2021 7	Real Sociedad	1–0	Elche	San Sebastián
18:30 CEST (UTC+2)	Portu (yellow card) 78'; Oyarzabal 81'	Report	Casilla (yellow card) 57'; Mojica (yellow card) 63'; Mascarell (yellow card) 64'	Stadium: Anoeta; Attendance: 23,941; Referee: Adrián Cordero Vega

3 October 2021 8	Getafe	1–1	Real Sociedad	Getafe
18:30 CEST (UTC+2)	Djené (yellow card) 37'; Sandro 40'; Soria (yellow card) 66'; Aleñá (yellow card) 72'; Ünal (yellow card) 86'	Report	Merino (yellow card) 43'; Oyarzabal 68'; Gorosabel (yellow card) 74'	Stadium: Coliseum Alfonso Pérez; Attendance: 8,463; Referee: Jorge Figueroa Vázquez

16 October 2021 9	Real Sociedad	1–0	Mallorca	San Sebastián
21:00 CEST (UTC+2)	Muñoz (yellow card) 14' (yellow-red card) 45+1'; Portu (yellow card) 45+3'; Lobete 90'	Report	Battaglia (yellow card) 42'; Ángel (yellow card) 45+3'; Rodríguez (yellow card) 85'	Stadium: Anoeta; Attendance: 30,831; Referee: Pablo González Fuertes

24 October 2021 10	Atlético Madrid	2–2	Real Sociedad	Madrid
21:00 CEST (UTC+2)	Felipe (yellow card) 31'; Suárez 61', 77' (pen.)	Report	Sørloth 7'; Zaldúa (yellow card) 41'; Isak 48'; Elustondo (yellow card) 68'; Merino (yellow card) 76'	Stadium: Wanda Metropolitano; Attendance: 50,032; Referee: José Luis Munuera Montero

28 October 2021 11	Celta Vigo	0–2	Real Sociedad	Vigo
19:00 CEST (UTC+2)	Beltrán (yellow card) 45'	Report	Isak 54'; Elustondo 79'	Stadium: Balaídos; Attendance: 8,726; Referee: Mario Melero López

31 October 2021 12	Real Sociedad	1–1	Athletic Bilbao	San Sebastián
21:00 CET (UTC+1)	Isak 58' (pen.), (yellow card) 71'; Januzaj (yellow card) 74'; Merino (yellow card) 78'; Guevara (yellow card) 90+3'	Report	Martínez (yellow card) 56' (yellow-red card) 84'; De Marcos (yellow card) 59'; Muniain 90+1'	Stadium: Anoeta; Attendance: 37,066; Referee: Juan Martínez Munuera

7 November 2021 13	Osasuna	0–2	Real Sociedad	Pamplona
18:30 CET (UTC+1)		Report	Rico (yellow card) 28'; Merino 72'; Januzaj 82' (pen.); Zubimendi (yellow card) 90+1'	Stadium: El Sadar; Attendance: 21,741; Referee: Miguel Ángel Ortiz Arias

21 November 2021 14	Real Sociedad	0–0	Valencia	San Sebastián
21:00 CET (UTC+1)	Guevara (yellow card) 50'; Elustondo (red card) 76'; Rico (yellow card) 87'; Turrientes (yellow card) 90+2'; Gorosabel (yellow card) 90+6'	Report	Gayà (yellow card) 57'; Foulquier (yellow card) 70'; Wass (yellow card) 76'; Musah (yellow card) 84'; Koindredi (yellow card) 87'; Costa (yellow card) 90'; Alderete (yellow card) 90+4'	Stadium: Anoeta; Attendance: 28,635; Referee: Mario Melero López

28 November 2021 15	Espanyol	1–0	Real Sociedad	Cornellà de Llobregat
16:15 CET (UTC+1)	Vidal (yellow card) 47'; Herrera 77'	Report	Sørloth (yellow card) 43'	Stadium: RCDE Stadium; Attendance: 19,935; Referee: Antonio Mateu Lahoz

4 December 2021 16	Real Sociedad	0–2	Real Madrid	San Sebastián
21:00 CET (UTC+1)	Zubeldia (yellow card) 26'; Januzaj (yellow card) 60'	Report	Vinícius 47'; Jović 57'	Stadium: Anoeta; Attendance: 35,765; Referee: Jesús Gil Manzano

12 December 2021 17	Real Betis	4–0	Real Sociedad	Seville
18:30 CET (UTC+1)	Moreno 14', 79', (yellow card) 56'; Rodríguez (yellow card) 36'; Juanmi 57'; Fekir (yellow card) 62', (goal) 66'	Report	Zubeldia (yellow card) 59'	Stadium: Benito Villamarín; Attendance: 52,158; Referee: José María Sánchez Martínez

18 December 2021 18	Real Sociedad	1–3	Villarreal	San Sebastián
16:15 CET (UTC+1)	Isak 32'; Merino (yellow card) 43'; Oyarzabal (red card) 49'; Zaldúa (yellow card) 88'	Report	Estupiñán (yellow card) 26'; Gerard 38', 68'; Torres (yellow card) 44'; Parejo (yellow card) 81'; Chukwueze 90+6'	Stadium: Anoeta; Attendance: 29,679; Referee: Jorge Figueroa Vázquez

2 January 2022 19	Alavés	1–1	Real Sociedad	Vitoria-Gasteiz
18:30 CET (UTC+1)	Laguardia (yellow card) 54'; Joselu 58' (pen.); Méndez (yellow card) 60'; Rioja (yellow card) 90'	Report	Januzaj 14', (yellow card) 85'; Zubeldia (yellow card) 56'; Silva (yellow card) 67'	Stadium: Mendizorrotza; Attendance: 13,498; Referee: Carlos del Cerro Grande

8 January 2022 20	Real Sociedad	1–0	Celta Vigo	San Sebastián
16:15 CET (UTC+1)	Oyarzabal 13'; Portu (yellow card) 43'; Elustondo (yellow card) 64'; Merino (yellow card) 90+1'	Report	Mina (yellow card) 30'; Aspas (yellow card) 72'	Stadium: Anoeta; Attendance: 27,938; Referee: Guillermo Cuadra Fernández

23 January 2022 22	Real Sociedad	0–0	Getafe	San Sebastián
18:30 CET (UTC+1)	Zubeldia (yellow card) 51'	Report	Cuenca (yellow card) 90'	Stadium: Anoeta; Attendance: 27,638; Referee: José Luis Munuera Montero

6 February 2022 23	Valencia	0–0	Real Sociedad	Valencia
14:00 CET (UTC+1)	Mosquera (yellow card) 26'; Moriba (yellow card) 37'; Guillamón (yellow card) 79'; Račić (yellow card) 90'	Report	Zubimendi (yellow card) 31'; Zubeldia (yellow card) 50'	Stadium: Mestalla; Attendance: 31,351; Referee: José María Sánchez Martínez

13 February 2022 24	Real Sociedad	2–0	Granada	San Sebastián
18:30 CET (UTC+1)	Oyarzabal 37' (pen.); Rafinha 74'	Report	Escudero (yellow card) 22'; Uzuni (yellow card) 26'	Stadium: Anoeta; Attendance: 29,847; Referee: Javier Alberola Rojas

20 February 2022 25	Athletic Bilbao	4–0	Real Sociedad	Bilbao
21:00 CET (UTC+1)	R. García (yellow card) 5'; Muniain (penalty missed) 32', 89'; Martínez (yellow card) 37'; D. García (yellow card) 55'; Vivian 68'; Sancet 72'; I. Williams 80'; Berenguer (yellow card) 90+4'	Report	Silva (yellow card) 30'	Stadium: San Mamés; Attendance: 40,698; Referee: Juan Martínez Munuera

27 February 2022 26	Real Sociedad	1–0	Osasuna	San Sebastián
18:30 CET (UTC+1)	Elustondo 52'	Report	Cruz (yellow card) 8'; Vidal (yellow card) 90+1'; José Ángel (yellow card) 90+6'; Torres (yellow card) 90+7'	Stadium: Anoeta; Attendance: 7,457; Referee: Antonio Mateu Lahoz

2 March 2022 21	Mallorca	0–2	Real Sociedad	Palma
21:00 CET (UTC+1)		Report	Silva 35'; Merino (yellow card) 52', (goal) 62'; Remiro (yellow card) 76'	Stadium: Visit Mallorca Stadium; Attendance: 11,150; Referee: Mario Melero López

5 March 2022 27	Real Madrid	4–1	Real Sociedad	Madrid
21:00 CET (UTC+1)	Camavinga 40'; Modrić 43'; Benzema 76' (pen.); Asensio 79'	Report	Oyarzabal 10' (pen.); Zaldúa (yellow card) 58'; Merino (yellow card) 81'	Stadium: Santiago Bernabéu; Attendance: 52,410; Referee: Jesús Gil Manzano

13 March 2022 28	Real Sociedad	1–0	Alavés	San Sebastián
18:30 CET (UTC+1)	Illarramendi (yellow card) 21'; Zubimendi 70'	Report	Laguardia (yellow card) 27'	Stadium: Anoeta; Attendance: 31,573; Referee: Jorge Figueroa Vázquez

20 March 2022 29	Sevilla	0–0	Real Sociedad	Seville
18:30 CET (UTC+1)		Report	Zaldúa (yellow card) 32'; Januzaj (yellow card) 82'; Gorosabel (yellow card) 89'	Stadium: Ramón Sánchez Pizjuán; Attendance: 24,861; Referee: César Soto Grado

4 April 2022 30	Real Sociedad	1–0	Espanyol	San Sebastián
21:00 CEST (UTC+2)	Rico (yellow card) 73'; Isak (yellow card) 90+1', (goal) 90+6' (pen.)	Report	Herrera (yellow card) 55'; Darder (yellow card) 76'; Vidal (yellow card) 90+5'; Pedrosa (yellow card) 90+7'	Stadium: Anoeta; Attendance: 20,869; Referee: Santiago Jaime Latre

10 April 2022 31	Elche	1–2	Real Sociedad	Elche
18:30 CEST (UTC+2)	Carrillo 3', (yellow card) 34'; Palacios (yellow card) 21'; Gumbau (yellow card) 24'	Report	Isak (penalty missed) 19', (yellow card) 19'; Sørloth 31'; Zubimendi (yellow card) 37'; Le Normand 39'; Zaldúa (yellow card) 82'	Stadium: Estadio Manuel Martínez Valero; Attendance: 17,011; Referee: Guillermo Cuadra Fernández

15 April 2022 32	Real Sociedad	0–0	Real Betis	San Sebastián
21:00 CEST (UTC+2)	Rafinha (yellow card) 60'; Silva (yellow card) 90+1' (yellow-red card) 90+3'; Sørloth (yellow card) 90+2'	Report	Carvalho (yellow card) 37'; Rodríguez (yellow card) 75'; Bravo (yellow card) 90+1'; Bartra (yellow card) 90+2'	Stadium: Anoeta; Attendance: 28,893; Referee: Isidro Díaz de Mera Escuderos

21 April 2022 33	Real Sociedad	0–1	Barcelona	San Sebastián
21:30 CEST (UTC+2)	Le Normand (yellow card) 90+2'	Report	Aubameyang 11'; Araújo (yellow card) 33'; Gavi (yellow card) 85'	Stadium: Anoeta; Attendance: 35,128; Referee: Carlos del Cerro Grande

1 May 2022 34	Rayo Vallecano	1–1	Real Sociedad	Madrid
18:30 CEST (UTC+2)	López (yellow card) 56'; Valentín (yellow card) 73'; Falcao 77'	Report	Sørloth 33'; Zubeldia (yellow card) 38'	Stadium: Campo de Fútbol de Vallecas; Attendance: 9,395; Referee: Alejandro Muñiz Ruiz

6 May 2022 35	Levante	2–1	Real Sociedad	Valencia
21:00 CEST (UTC+2)	Pier (yellow card) 52'; Miramón 53'; Postigo (yellow card) 89'; Melero 90' (pen.)	Report	Isak (yellow card) 38'; Silva 66'; Rico (yellow card) 87'; Le Normand (yellow card) 89'	Stadium: Ciutat de València; Attendance: 17,278; Referee: Javier Alberola Rojas

12 May 2022 36	Real Sociedad	3–0	Cádiz	San Sebastián
19:00 CEST (UTC+2)	Sørloth 19'; Januzaj 53' (pen.); Rafinha (yellow card) 60'; Silva (yellow card) 63'; Zubeldia (yellow card) 66'; Portu 90+8' (pen.), (yellow card) 90+8'	Report	José Mari (yellow card) 4'; Alcaraz (yellow card) 82'	Stadium: Anoeta; Attendance: 29,014; Referee: Juan Martínez Munuera

15 May 2022 37	Villarreal	1–2	Real Sociedad	Villarreal
19:30 CEST (UTC+2)	Coquelin 43'; Foyth (yellow card) 68'; Albiol (yellow card) 77'; Lo Celso (yellow card) 90+6'; Jackson (yellow card) 90+11'	Report	Zaldúa (yellow card) 2'; Isak 56', (yellow card) 82'; Zubimendi 73'	Stadium: Estadio de la Cerámica; Attendance: 16,689; Referee: Pablo González Fuertes

22 May 2022 38	Real Sociedad	1–2	Atlético Madrid	San Sebastián
22:00 CEST (UTC+2)	Le Normand (yellow card) 13'; Rafinha (yellow card) 36'; Merino (yellow card) 54'; Portu (yellow card) 76'; Guridi 90+3'	Report	Griezmann (yellow card) 45+2'; De Paul 50'; Correa 69'; Savić (yellow card) 90+2'	Stadium: Anoeta; Attendance: 23,586; Referee: Jesús Gil Manzano

=== Copa del Rey ===
1 December 2021 First round	Panadería Pulido	0–4	Real Sociedad	Las Palmas de Gran Canaria
21:00 CET (UTC+1)		Report	Portu 6'; Muñoz 7'; Sørloth 60'; Djouahra 71'	Stadium: Gran Canaria (Note: Panadería Pulido played its game at Gran Canaria, in Las Palmas de Gran Canaria instead of their regular stadium San Mateo in Vega de San Mateo as it does not meet the requirements established by the Royal Spanish Football Federation.); Attendance: 3,841; Referee: Jorge Figueroa Vázquez

15 December 2021 Second round	Zamora	0–3	Real Sociedad	Zamora
19:00 CET (UTC+1)	Campos (yellow card) 33'	Report	Guridi 47'; Turrientes 70'; Oyarzabal 90+2'	Stadium: Estadio Ruta de la Plata; Attendance: 4,251; Referee: Valentín Pizarro Gómez

5 January 2022 Round of 32	Leganés	2–3	Real Sociedad	Leganés
16:00 CET (UTC+1)	Merino (yellow card) 21'; Bustinza (yellow card) 32'; Muñoz 60', 70'; Garcés (yellow card) 86'; Quintillà (yellow card) 90'	Report	Isak 8'; Oyarzabal 43', 74' (pen.)	Stadium: Butarque; Attendance: 6,430; Referee: Antonio Mateu Lahoz

19 January 2022 Round of 16	Real Sociedad	2–0	Atlético Madrid	San Sebastián
21:00 CET (UTC+1)	Muñoz (yellow card) 28'; Januzaj 33'; Sørloth 47'; Silva (yellow card) 59'	Report	Hermoso (yellow card) 31'; Felipe (yellow card) 39'; Cunha (yellow card) 90+2'	Stadium: Anoeta; Attendance: 28,111; Referee: Javier Alberola Rojas

3 February 2022 Quarter-finals	Real Sociedad	0–4	Real Betis	San Sebastián
20:00 CET (UTC+1)	Zaldúa (yellow card) 82'	Report	Juanmi 12', 57'; Bartra (yellow card) 38'; Willian José 83' (pen.); Ruibal 87'	Stadium: Anoeta; Attendance: 29,326; Referee: Juan Martínez Munuera

=== UEFA Europa League ===
==== Group stage ====
The draw for the group stage was held on 27 August 2021.

Pos	Team	Pld	W	D	L	GF	GA	GD	Pts	Qualification	MON	RSO	PSV	STU
1	(France) Monaco	6	3	3	0	7	4	+3	12	Advance to round of 16	—	2–1	0–0	1–0
2	(Spain) Real Sociedad	6	2	3	1	9	6	+3	9	Advance to knockout round play-offs	1–1	—	3–0	1–1
3	(Netherlands) PSV Eindhoven	6	2	2	2	9	8	+1	8	Transfer to Europa Conference League	1–2	2–2	—	2–0
4	(Austria) Sturm Graz	6	0	2	4	3	10	−7	2		1–1	0–1	1–4	—

Source: UEFA
Rules for classification: Group stage tiebreakers

16 September 2021 1	PSV Eindhoven (Netherlands)	2–2	(Spain) Real Sociedad	Eindhoven, Netherlands
21:00 CEST (UTC+2)	Götze 32'; Gakpo 54'; Van Ginkel (yellow card) 59'; Carlos Vinícius (yellow card) 79'	Report	Januzaj 34'; Isak 39'; Muñoz (yellow card) 42'; Guevara (yellow card) 70'; Oyarzabal (yellow card) 77'; Elustondo (yellow card) 84'; Zubeldia (yellow card) 90+1'	Stadium: Philips Stadion; Attendance: 23,135; Referee: Willie Collum (Scotland)

30 September 2021 2	Real Sociedad (Spain)	1–1	(France) Monaco	San Sebastián, Spain
18:45 CEST (UTC+2)	Merino 53'; Elustondo (yellow card) 90+2'	Report	Disasi 16', (yellow card) 90+2'; Maripán (yellow card) 87'; Volland (yellow card) 90+2'	Stadium: Anoeta; Attendance: 23,765; Referee: Sergey Ivanov (Russia)

21 October 2021 3	Sturm Graz (Austria)	0–1	(Spain) Real Sociedad	Graz, Austria
21:00 CEST (UTC+2)	Stanković (yellow card) 59' (yellow-red card) 87'	Report	Gorosabel (yellow card) 24'; Merino (yellow card) 26'; Zubeldia (yellow card) 60'; Guevara (yellow card) 65'; Isak 69'	Stadium: Liebenauer Stadium; Attendance: 14,809; Referee: Tobias Stieler (Germany)

4 November 2021 4	Real Sociedad (Spain)	1–1	(Austria) Sturm Graz	San Sebastián, Spain
18:45 CET (UTC+1)	Sørloth 53'; Zubimendi (yellow card) 74'	Report	Jantscher 38'; Wüthrich (yellow card) 58'; Kuen (yellow card) 78'; Siebenhandl (yellow card) 90+1'	Stadium: Anoeta; Attendance: 25,010; Referee: Andris Treimanis (Latvia)

25 November 2021 5	Monaco (France)	2–1	(Spain) Real Sociedad	Monaco, France
21:00 CET (UTC+1)	Maripán (yellow card) 15'; Volland 28'; Golovin (yellow card) 33'; Fofana 38', (red card) 89'; Nübel (yellow card) 90+5'	Report	Isak 35'; Zaldúa (yellow card) 44'; Januzaj (yellow card) 58'; Zubimendi (yellow card) 75'	Stadium: Stade Louis II; Attendance: 3,834; Referee: Ivan Kružliak (Slovakia)

9 December 2021 6	Real Sociedad (Spain)	3–0	(Netherlands) PSV Eindhoven	San Sebastián, Spain
18:45 CET (UTC+1)	Oyarzabal 43' (pen.), 62'; Zubimendi (yellow card) 45+2'; Isak (yellow card) 82'; Sørloth 90+3'	Report	Sangaré (yellow card) 40' (yellow-red card) 75'; Mwene (yellow card) 42'; Boscagli (yellow card) 60'; Carlos Vinícius (yellow card) 81'; Götze (yellow card) 87'; Bruma (yellow card) 90+2'	Stadium: Anoeta; Attendance: 24,940; Referee: Felix Zwayer (Germany)

==== Knockout phase ====
===== Knockout round play-offs =====
The draw for the knockout round play-offs was held on 13 December 2021.

17 February 2022 First leg	RB Leipzig (Germany)	2–2	(Spain) Real Sociedad	Leipzig, Germany
21:00 CET (UTC+1)	Nkunku 30'; Forsberg 81' (pen.)	Report	Le Normand 8'; Oyarzabal 64' (pen.)	Stadium: Red Bull Arena; Attendance: 21,113; Referee: Cüneyt Çakır (Turkey)

24 February 2022 Second leg	Real Sociedad (Spain)	1–3 (3–5 agg.)	(Germany) RB Leipzig	San Sebastián, Spain
18:45 CET (UTC+1)	Zubimendi 67'; Januzaj (yellow card) 90'	Report	Silva (penalty missed) 39', 59', (yellow card) 63'; Orbán 39', (yellow card) 72'; Kampl (yellow card) 85'; Forsberg 89' (pen.)	Stadium: Anoeta; Attendance: 30,113; Referee: Anthony Taylor (England)

== Statistics ==
=== Squad statistics ===
Last updated on 22 May 2022.

No.	Pos	Nat	Player	Total		La Liga		Copa del Rey		UEFA Europa League	
No.	Pos	Nat	Player	Apps	Goals	Apps	Goals	Apps	Goals	Apps	Goals
Goalkeepers
1	GK	(Spain) ESP	Álex Remiro	42	0	35	0	2	0	5	0
13	GK	(Australia) AUS	Mathew Ryan	9	0	3	0	3	0	3	0
32	GK	(Spain) ESP	Unai Marrero	0	0	0	0	0	0	0	0
Defenders
2	DF	(Spain) ESP	Joseba Zaldúa	35	0	14+10	0	4	0	6+1	0
6	DF	(Spain) ESP	Aritz Elustondo	40	4	22+8	4	3+1	0	6	0
12	DF	(Spain) ESP	Aihen Muñoz	31	1	15+5	0	3	1	7+1	0
15	DF	(Spain) ESP	Diego Rico	26	0	19+2	0	2+1	0	1+1	0
18	DF	(Spain) ESP	Andoni Gorosabel	40	0	25+7	0	1+1	0	2+4	0
20	DF	(Spain) ESP	Nacho Monreal	0	0	0	0	0	0	0	0
24	DF	(France) FRA	Robin Le Normand	48	2	37	1	4	0	7	1
26	DF	(Spain) ESP	Jon Pacheco	16	0	4+6	0	3	0	0+3	0
31	DF	(Spain) ESP	Álex Sola	2	0	0+2	0	0	0	0+0	0
42	DF	(Spain) ESP	Cristo	2	0	0+1	0	0	0	0+1	0
Midfielders
3	MF	(Spain) ESP	Martín Zubimendi	47	3	26+10	2	1+3	0	7	1
4	MF	(Spain) ESP	Asier Illarramendi	10	0	6+2	0	1	0	0+1	0
5	MF	(Spain) ESP	Igor Zubeldia	34	0	19+7	0	0+1	0	6+1	0
7	MF	(Spain) ESP	Portu	49	2	17+20	1	1+4	1	6+1	0
8	MF	(Spain) ESP	Mikel Merino	43	4	33+1	3	3	0	6	1
11	MF	(Belgium) BEL	Adnan Januzaj	44	5	17+16	3	4	1	6+1	1
14	MF	(Spain) ESP	Jon Guridi	9	2	1+7	1	1	1	0	0
16	MF	(Spain) ESP	Ander Guevara	24	0	11+6	0	4	0	2+1	0
17	MF	(Brazil) BRA	Rafinha	21	1	13+4	1	0+2	0	2	0
21	MF	(Spain) ESP	David Silva	32	2	22+3	2	2+1	0	3+1	0
27	MF	(Spain) ESP	Beñat Turrientes	13	1	1+7	0	0+1	1	0+4	0
29	MF	(Spain) ESP	Robert Navarro	7	0	3+3	0	1	0	0	0
46	MF	(Spain) ESP	Jon Ander Olasagasti	2	0	0	0	2	0	0	0
Forwards
9	FW	(Spain) ESP	Carlos Fernández	0	0	0	0	0	0	0	0
10	FW	(Spain) ESP	Mikel Oyarzabal	33	15	19+3	9	3+2	3	6	3
19	FW	(Sweden) SWE	Alexander Isak	41	10	26+6	6	2+1	1	5+1	3
22	FW	(Spain) ESP	Ander Barrenetxea	16	1	6+5	1	1	0	0+4	0
23	FW	(Norway) NOR	Alexander Sørloth	44	8	20+13	4	3+1	2	2+5	2
33	FW	(Spain) ESP	Jon Karrikaburu	1	0	0	0	0	0	0+1	0
35	FW	(Spain) ESP	Julen Lobete	14	2	2+11	2	0	0	0+1	0
37	FW	(France) FRA	Naïs Djouahra	11	1	1+6	0	1+2	1	0+1	0
41	FW	(Spain) ESP	Germán Valera	3	0	0+3	0	0	0	0	0
47	FW	(Spain) ESP	Ander Martín	6	0	1+4	0	0	0	0+1	0
Players who have made an appearance this season but have left the club
25	FW	(Spain) ESP	Jon Bautista	1	0	0+1	0	0	0	0	0

=== Goalscorers ===
As of 25 November 2021

Rank	Player	La Liga	Copa del Rey	Europa League	Total
1	(Spain) Mikel Oyarzabal	6	0	0	6
1	(Sweden) Alexander Isak	3	0	3	6
3	(Spain) Aritz Elustondo	3	0	0	3
3	(Spain) Mikel Merino	2	0	1	3
5	(Spain) Julen Lobete	2	0	0	2
5	(Belgium) Adnan Januzaj	1	0	1	2
5	(Norway) Alexander Sørloth	1	0	1	2
8	(Spain) Ander Barrenetxea	1	0	0	1
Own goals		0	0	0	0
Total		19	0	6	25
