= Alberto López =

Alberto López may refer to: Lowrider

== Politicians ==
- Alberto López Rojas (born 1959), Mexican politician
- Alberto López Bello (1985–2013), Mexican journalist
- Alberto López Díaz (born 1966), Cuban politician

== Sportspeople ==
=== Football ===
- Alberto López (Guatemalan footballer) (born 1944), Guatemalan football defender and manager
- Alberto López (footballer, born 1967), Spanish football forward
- Alberto López (footballer, born 1969), Spanish football goalkeeper
- Alberto López (footballer, born 1988), Spanish football winger
- Alberto López (footballer, born 1995), Spanish football left-back

=== Other sports ===
- Alberto López Arce (1907-unknown), Cuban chess player
- Alberto López (basketball) (1929–2003), Argentine basketball player
- Alberto López (sprinter) (born 1963), Guatemalan sprinter
- Alberto López de Munain (born 1972), Spanish cyclist
