= Jon Pacheco =

Spanish footballer (born 2001)

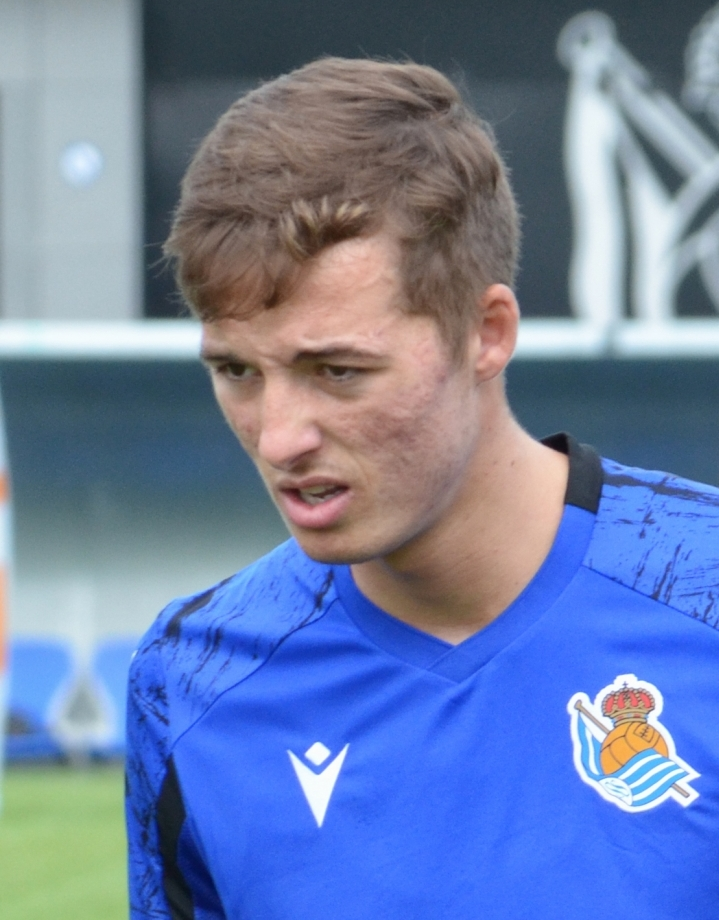
- Pacheco training with Real Sociedad in 2021

Personal information
- Full name: Jon Pacheco Dozagarat
- Date of birth: 8 January 2001 (age 25)
- Place of birth: Elizondo, Spain
- Height: 1.84 m (6 ft 0 in)
- Position: Centre-back

Team information
- Current team: Real Sociedad
- Number: 16

Youth career
- Baztán
- 2013–2018: Real Sociedad

Senior career*
Years	Team	Apps	(Gls)
2018–2019	Real Sociedad C	19	(0)
2019–2022	Real Sociedad B	34	(0)
2020–	Real Sociedad	67	(1)
2025–2026	→ Alavés (loan)	22	(0)

International career^{‡}
2018	Spain U17	1	(0)
2018–2019	Spain U18	10	(0)
2019–2020	Spain U19	4	(0)
2019	Spain U20	5	(0)
2022–2023	Spain U21	15	(0)
2024	Spain U23	4	(0)
2024–	Basque Country	1	(0)
Medal record
Representing Spain
Olympic Games
Gold medal – first place	2024 Paris	Team
UEFA European Under-21 Championship
Runner-up	2023 Georgia–Romania	Team
- * Club domestic league appearances and goals as of 7 September 2026 ‡ National team caps and goals as of 9 August 2024

Jon Pacheco Dozagarat (born 8 January 2001) is a Spanish professional footballer who plays as a centre-back for La Liga club Real Sociedad.

== Club career ==
Born in Elizondo, Navarre, Pacheco joined Real Sociedad's youth setup in 2013, aged 12, from CD Baztán. He made his senior debut with the C-team on 8 December 2018, coming on as a half-time substitute in a 0–0 Tercera División away draw against CD Basconia.

Pacheco was promoted to the reserves in Segunda División B ahead of the 2019–20 campaign, and signed a contract until 2025 on 30 August 2019. He made his first team – and La Liga – debut on 29 June of the following year, starting in a 2–1 away loss against Getafe CF.

Ahead of the 2021–22 season, Real Sociedad director of football Roberto Olabe announced that Pacheco and Sanse teammate Robert Navarro were promoted to the main squad. He scored his first goal in the top tier on 31 March 2024, netting the winner in a 1–0 away win over Deportivo Alavés.

On 25 August 2025, Pacheco moved to Alavés on loan for one year.

== International career ==
Pacheco represented Spain at under-16, under-17, under-18 and under-19 levels, playing in the 2018 UEFA European Under-17 Championship.

== Career statistics ==
=== Club ===
As of match played 22 October 2026

Appearances and goals by club, season and competition
Club	Season	League			National cup		Continental		Other		Total	
Club	Season	Division	Apps	Goals	Apps	Goals	Apps	Goals	Apps	Goals	Apps	Goals
Real Sociedad C	2018–19	Tercera Federación	19	0	—		—		—		19	0
Real Sociedad B	2018–19	Segunda División B	1	0	—		—		—		1	0
Real Sociedad B	2019–20	Segunda División B	20	0	—		—		—		20	0
Real Sociedad B	2020–21	Segunda División B	11	0	—		—		—		11	0
Real Sociedad B	2021–22	La Liga 2	2	0	—		—		—		2	0
Real Sociedad B	Total		34	0	—		—		—		34	0
Real Sociedad	2019–20	La Liga	1	0	0	0	0	0	—		1	0
Real Sociedad	2020–21	La Liga	1	0	0	0	0	0	—		1	0
Real Sociedad	2021–22	La Liga	10	0	3	0	3 (Note: Appearances in UEFA Europa League)	0	—		16	0
Real Sociedad	2022–23	La Liga	17	0	3	0	5	0	—		25	0
Real Sociedad	2023–24	La Liga	23	1	3	0	5 (Note: Appearances in UEFA Champions League)	0	—		31	1
Real Sociedad	2024–25	La Liga	14	0	3	0	5	1	—		22	1
Real Sociedad	2026–27	La Liga	1	0	0	0	1	0	—		2	0
Real Sociedad	Total		67	1	12	0	19	1	0	0	98	2
Alavés (loan)	2025–26	La Liga	22	0	3	0	—		—		25	0
Career total			142	1	15	0	19	1	0	0	176	2

=== International ===
As of match played 21 March 2024

Appearances and goals by national team and year
National team	Year	Apps	Goals
Spain	2024	4	0
Total		4	0

== Honours ==
Spain U21

- UEFA European Under-21 Championship runner-up: 2023

Spain U23

- Summer Olympics gold medal: 2024
