= Unai Marrero =

Spanish footballer (born 2001)

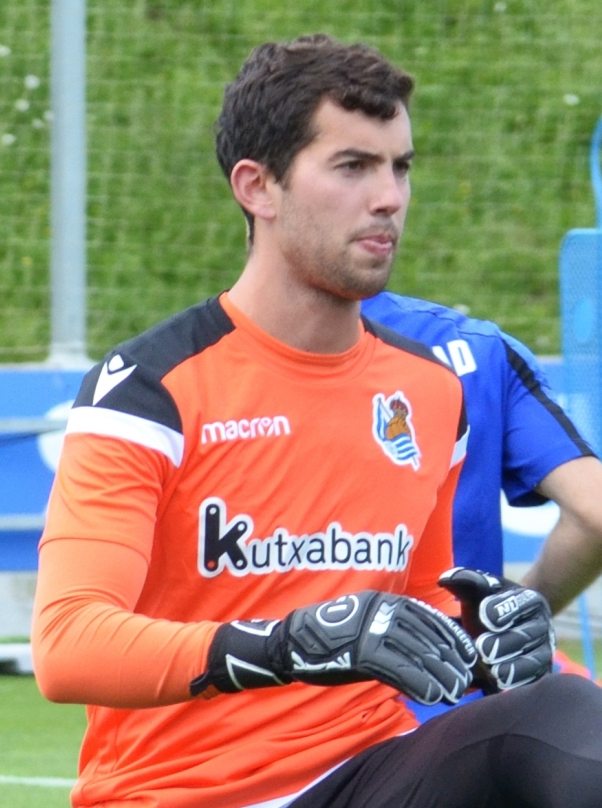
- Marrero training with Real Sociedad in 2021

Personal information
- Full name: Unai Marrero Larrañaga
- Date of birth: 9 October 2001 (age 25)
- Place of birth: San Sebastián, Spain
- Height: 1.89 m (6 ft 2 in)
- Position: Goalkeeper

Team information
- Current team: Real Sociedad
- Number: 13

Youth career
- Lagun Onak
- 2016–2019: Real Sociedad

Senior career*
Years	Team	Apps	(Gls)
2019–2022	Real Sociedad C	44	(0)
2020–2023	Real Sociedad B	38	(0)
2023–	Real Sociedad	5	(0)

International career
2025–	Basque Country	2	(0)
- * Club domestic league appearances and goals as of 7 September 2025

Unai Marrero Larrañaga (born 9 October 2001) is a Spanish professional footballer who plays as a goalkeeper for La Liga club Real Sociedad.

== Club career ==
Born in San Sebastián, Gipuzkoa, Basque Country, Marrero joined Real Sociedad's youth setup in 2016, from CD Lagun Onak. He made his senior debut with the C-team on 14 September 2019, starting in a 2–1 Tercera División away loss against Pasaia KE.

Marrero made his professional debut with the reserves on 10 October 2021, coming on as a first-half substitute for outfield player Jon Karrikaburu as Andoni Zubiaurre was sent-off in a 1–1 home draw against SD Ponferradina in the Segunda División. He was definitely promoted to the B's ahead of the 2022–23 Primera Federación, and renewed his contract until 2027 on 12 July 2023.

On 2 January 2024, Unai made his debut in a La Liga match against Deportivo Alavés, which was played at the Estadio de Anoeta and ended in a 1–1 draw.

== International career ==
Marrero was called up to the Basque Country national team for a friendly match against Palestine on 15 November 2025.

== Career statistics ==
As of match played 22 October 2026

Appearances and goals by club, season and competition
Club	Season	League			Cup		Europe		Other		Total	
Club	Season	Division	Apps	Goals	Apps	Goals	Apps	Goals	Apps	Goals	Apps	Goals
Real Sociedad C	2019–20	Tercera Federación	9	0	—		—		—		9	0
Real Sociedad C	2020–21	Tercera Federación	13	0	—		—		—		13	0
Real Sociedad C	2021–22	Segunda Federación	22	0	—		—		—		22	0
Real Sociedad C	Total		44	0	—		—		—		44	0
Real Sociedad B	2021–22	Segunda División	2	0	—		—		—		2	0
Real Sociedad B	2022–23	Primera Federación	36	0	—		—		—		36	0
Real Sociedad B	Total		38	0	—		—		—		38	0
Real Sociedad	2021–22	La Liga	0	0	0	0	0	0	—		0	0
Real Sociedad	2022–23	La Liga	0	0	0	0	0	0	—		0	0
Real Sociedad	2023–24	La Liga	2	0	3	0	0	0	—		5	0
Real Sociedad	2024–25	La Liga	2	0	3	0	3 (Note: Appearances in UEFA Europa League)	0	—		8	0
Real Sociedad	2025–26	La Liga	1	0	6	0	—		—		7	0
Real Sociedad	2026–27	La Liga	1	0	0	0	3	0	0	0	4	0
Real Sociedad	Total		6	0	12	0	6	0	0	0	24	0
Career total			88	0	12	0	6	0	0	0	106	0

== Honours ==
Real Sociedad

- Copa del Rey: 2025–26
