= Igor Zubeldia =

Spanish footballer (born 1997)

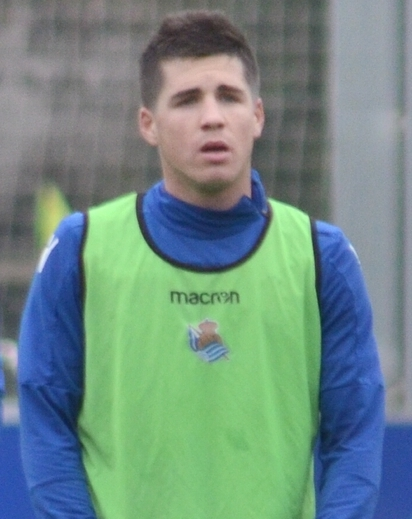
- Zubeldia with Real Sociedad in 2018

Personal information
- Full name: Igor Zubeldia Elorza
- Date of birth: 30 March 1997 (age 29)
- Place of birth: Azkoitia, Spain
- Height: 1.80 m (5 ft 11 in)
- Positions: Defensive midfielder; centre-back

Team information
- Current team: Real Sociedad
- Number: 5

Youth career
- 2008–2015: Real Sociedad

Senior career*
Years	Team	Apps	(Gls)
2015–2017	Real Sociedad B	52	(3)
2016–	Real Sociedad	267	(3)

International career^{‡}
2015	Spain U18	4	(0)
2018–2019	Spain U21	4	(0)
2025–	Basque Country	1	(0)
- * Club domestic league appearances and goals as of 23:00, 18 October 2026 (UTC) ‡ National team caps and goals as of 15 November 2025

Igor Zubeldia Elorza (born 30 March 1997) is a Spanish professional footballer who plays as a defensive midfielder or a central defender for La Liga club Real Sociedad.

== Club career ==
Born in Azkoitia, Gipuzkoa, Basque Country, Zubeldia joined Real Sociedad's youth setup in 2008, at the age of 11. In June 2015, he reached the reserve team in the Segunda División B.

Zubeldia made his senior debut on 29 August 2015, coming on as a second-half substitute in a 1–0 away loss against CD Ebro. On 25 February of the following year, he renewed his contract with Sanse until 2021.

Zubeldia made his first team – and La Liga – debut on 13 May 2016, replacing fellow youth graduate Rubén Pardo in the dying minutes of a 1–0 away win over Valencia CF. Ahead of the 2017–18 season, he was definitely promoted to the main squad.

On 20 December 2017, after just 30 seconds on the pitch, Zubeldia scored his first goal in the Spanish top flight to put the hosts ahead in the 76th minute of an eventual 3–1 home defeat of Sevilla FC. The next 29 June, he agreed to an extension until 2024.

Zubeldia contributed 31 league games in the 2022–23 campaign (39 in all competitions), as the club finished fourth and returned to the UEFA Champions League ten years later. His debut in the competition took place on 20 September 2023, in a 1–1 group-stage home draw against Inter Milan.

Zubeldia made his 300th competitive appearance for Real on 10 May 2025, playing the second half of the 4–0 loss at Atlético Madrid.

== Career statistics ==
As of match played 22 October 2026

Appearances and goals by club, season and competition
Club	Season	League			National Cup		Continental		Other		Total	
Club	Season	Division	Apps	Goals	Apps	Goals	Apps	Goals	Apps	Goals	Apps	Goals
Real Sociedad B	2015–16	Segunda División B	27	1	—		—		—		27	1
Real Sociedad B	2016–17	Segunda División B	25	2	—		—		—		25	2
Real Sociedad B	Total		52	3	—		—		—		52	3
Real Sociedad	2015–16	La Liga	1	0	0	0	—		—		1	0
Real Sociedad	2016–17	La Liga	4	0	0	0	—		—		4	0
Real Sociedad	2017–18	La Liga	25	1	1	0	5 (Note: Appearances in UEFA Europa League)	0	—		31	1
Real Sociedad	2018–19	La Liga	33	0	4	1	—		—		37	1
Real Sociedad	2019–20	La Liga	33	0	8 (Note: Includes appearance in 2020 Copa del Rey final (played in 2021))	0	—		—		41	0
Real Sociedad	2020–21	La Liga	24	1	2	0	4	0	1 (Note: Appearance in Supercopa de España)	0	31	1
Real Sociedad	2021–22	La Liga	26	0	1	0	7	0	—		22	0
Real Sociedad	2022–23	La Liga	31	1	3	0	5	0	—		39	0
Real Sociedad	2023–24	La Liga	30	0	5	0	8 (Note: Appearances in UEFA Champions League)	0	—		43	0
Real Sociedad	2024–25	La Liga	28	0	5	0	8	0	—		41	0
Real Sociedad	2025–26	La Liga	25	0	4	1	—		—		29	1
Real Sociedad	2026–27	La Liga	7	0	0	0	2	0	0	0	9	0
Real Sociedad	Total		267	3	33	2	39	0	1	0	340	5
Career total			319	6	33	2	39	0	1	0	392	8

== Honours ==
Real Sociedad

- Copa del Rey: 2019–20, 2025–26

Spain U21

- UEFA European Under-21 Championship: 2019
