= Alberto Dadie =

Spanish footballer (born 2002)

Personal information
- Full name: Alberto Dadie Izaguirre
- Date of birth: 20 July 2002 (age 24)
- Place of birth: San Sebastián, Spain
- Height: 1.70 m (5 ft 7 in)
- Positions: Right-back; winger

Team information
- Current team: Burgos

Youth career
- 2014–2020: Real Sociedad

Senior career*
Years	Team	Apps	(Gls)
2020–2022	Real Sociedad C	39	(4)
2022–2026	Real Sociedad B	87	(3)
2023–2024	Real Sociedad	1	(0)
2024–2025	→ Mirandés (loan)	10	(0)
2026–	Burgos	0	(0)
- * Club domestic league appearances and goals as of 31 May 2026

Alberto Dadie Izaguirre (born 20 July 2002) is a Spanish professional footballer who plays as a right-back or a right winger for Burgos CF.

== Career ==
Born in San Sebastián, Gipuzkoa, Basque Country, Dadie joined Real Sociedad's youth sides in the Infantil category. Promoted to the C-team in August 2020, he made his senior debut on 18 October, starting and scoring the opener in a 2–1 Tercera División away loss to Gernika Club.

Promoted to the reserves in Primera Federación in July 2022, Dadie was mainly a backup option in his first season, before becoming a starter in his second. He made his first team debut on 1 November 2023, coming on as a half-time substitute for Jon Magunazelaia in a 1–0 away win over CD Buñol, for the campaign's Copa del Rey.

Dadie made his professional – and La Liga – debut on 13 January 2024, replacing Arsen Zakharyan in a 2–1 loss at rivals Athletic Bilbao. On 29 August, he was loaned to Segunda División side CD Mirandés, for one year.

Upon returning, Dadie was assigned back to the B-team, now also in the second division, and left Real Sociedad after 12 seasons in June 2026. On 5 July, he signed a two-year deal with Burgos CF also in division two.
