= Jon Magunazelaia =

Spanish footballer (born 2001)

Personal information
- Full name: Jon Magunazelaia Argoitia
- Date of birth: 13 July 2001 (age 25)
- Place of birth: Eibar, Spain
- Height: 1.72 m (5 ft 8 in)
- Position: Attacking midfielder

Team information
- Current team: Eibar
- Number: 11

Youth career
- Eibar
- 2016–2020: Real Sociedad

Senior career*
| Years | Team | Apps | (Gls) |
| 2020–2022 | Real Sociedad C | 31 | (6) |
| 2021–2024 | Real Sociedad B | 71 | (12) |
| 2022–2025 | Real Sociedad | 9 | (0) |
| 2025 | → Córdoba (loan) | 20 | (0) |
| 2025– | Eibar | 34 | (2) |
- * Club domestic league appearances and goals as of 13:50, 6 June 2026 (UTC)

Jon Magunazelaia Argoitia (born 13 July 2001) is a Spanish professional footballer who plays as an attacking midfielder for SD Eibar.

== Career ==
Born in Eibar, Gipuzkoa, Basque Country, Magunazelaia joined Real Sociedad's youth setup in 2016 from SD Eibar, after being linked to Athletic Bilbao. He made his senior debut with the C-team on 18 October 2020, coming on as a second-half substitute in a 1–2 Tercera División away loss against Gernika Club.

Magunazelaia scored his first senior goals on 8 December 2020, netting a hat-trick for the C's in a 5–2 home success over JD Somorrostro. During the 2020–21 campaign, he scored five goals in 24 appearances as the C-side achieved promotion to Segunda División RFEF.

Magunazelaia made his professional debut with the reserves on 18 September 2021, starting and scoring the opener in a 1–1 away loss against Real Zaragoza in the Segunda División. He netted a further two goals in 26 appearances for the B-team during the season, suffering team relegation.

Magunazelaia made his first team debut on 27 October 2022, coming on as a second-half substitute for fellow youth graduate Jon Karrikaburu in a 2–0 UEFA Europa League away win over AC Omonia. His La Liga debut occurred three days later, as he replaced Carlos Fernández in a 2–0 home loss to Real Betis.

On 11 January 2023, Magunazelaia renewed his contract with the Txuri-urdin until 2026. He was definitely promoted to the main squad ahead of the 2024–25 season, wearing the number 25 jersey.

On 30 December 2024, after being rarely used, Magunazelaia was loaned to Córdoba CF in the second division until June. The following 27 June, he signed a three-year deal with SD Eibar in the same tier.

== Career statistics ==
As of match played 12 December 2024

Appearances and goals by club, season and competition
| Club | Season | League | | | Cup | | Europe | | Other | | Total | |
| Club | Season | Division | Apps | Goals | Apps | Goals | Apps | Goals | Apps | Goals | Apps | Goals |
|---|---|---|---|---|---|---|---|---|---|---|---|---|
| Real Sociedad C | 2020–21 | Tercera División | 23 | 5 | — | | — | | — | | 23 | 5 |
| Real Sociedad C | 2021–22 | Segunda Federación | 8 | 1 | — | | — | | — | | 8 | 1 |
| Real Sociedad C | Total | | 31 | 6 | — | | — | | — | | 31 | 6 |
| Real Sociedad B | 2021–22 | Segunda División | 26 | 3 | — | | — | | — | | 26 | 3 |
| Real Sociedad B | 2022–23 | Primera Federación | 29 | 7 | — | | — | | 2 (Note: Appearances in Segunda División B play-offs) | 0 | 31 | 7 |
| Real Sociedad B | 2023–24 | Primera Federación | 11 | 1 | — | | — | | — | | 11 | 1 |
| Real Sociedad B | Total | | 66 | 11 | — | | — | | 2 | 0 | 68 | 11 |
| Real Sociedad | 2022–23 | La Liga | 2 | 0 | 1 | 0 | 2 (Note: Appearacnces in UEFA Europa League) | 0 | — | | 5 | 0 |
| Real Sociedad | 2023–24 | La Liga | 5 | 0 | 5 | 0 | 1 (Note: Appearances in UEFA Champions League) | 0 | — | | 11 | 0 |
| Real Sociedad | 2024–25 | La Liga | 2 | 0 | 2 | 1 | 1 | 0 | — | | 5 | 1 |
| Real Sociedad | Total | | 9 | 0 | 8 | 1 | 4 | 0 | — | | 21 | 1 |
| Career total | | | 106 | 16 | 8 | 1 | 4 | 0 | 2 | 0 | 120 | 17 |
