= Alberto López (footballer, born 1988) =

Spanish footballer

Personal information
- Full name: Alberto López Arteseros
- Date of birth: 9 March 1988 (age 38)
- Place of birth: Palma, Spain
- Height: 1.80 m (5 ft 11 in)
- Position: Winger

Youth career
- 1999–2007: Mallorca

Senior career*
Years	Team	Apps	(Gls)
2007–2012	Mallorca B	116	(2)
2008–2012	Mallorca	1	(0)
2012–2013	Pierikos	4	(0)
2013–2014	Constància	4	(0)
- * Club domestic league appearances and goals as of 26 October 2013

Alberto López Arteseros (born 9 March 1988) is a Spanish footballer who plays as a winger.

== Club career ==
López joined in RCD Mallorca's youth system in 1999, aged 11, and made his senior debuts with the B-team in 2007–08 season, in the fourth division. He made his professional – and La Liga – debut on 20 April 2008, in a 4–1 away win over Real Murcia.

In July 2012 López moved abroad, signing a contract with Pierikos However, after appearing sparingly in Greece, he returned to his country a year later, signing contract with CE Constància.
