= Ander Martín =

Spanish association football player (born 2000)

Personal information
- Full name: Ander Martín Odriozola
- Date of birth: 16 November 2000 (age 25)
- Place of birth: San Sebastián, Spain
- Height: 1.76 m (5 ft 9 in)
- Position: Winger

Team information
- Current team: Cartagena
- Number: 16

Youth career
- Antiguoko
- 2018–2019: Real Sociedad

Senior career*
Years	Team	Apps	(Gls)
2019–2020	Real Sociedad C	23	(4)
2020–2023	Real Sociedad B	69	(7)
2022–2023	Real Sociedad	8	(0)
2023–2025	Burgos	36	(2)
2024–2025	→ Mirandés (loan)	24	(0)
2025–	Cartagena	23	(0)
- * Club domestic league appearances and goals as of 10 June 2026

Ander Martín Odriozola (born 16 November 2000) is a Spanish professional footballer who plays as a right winger for Primera Federación club Cartagena.

== Club career ==
Martín was born in San Sebastián, Gipuzkoa, Basque Country, and joined Real Sociedad's youth setup in 2018, from Antiguoko. He made his senior debut with the C-team on 25 August 2019, starting and scoring the opener in a 1–1 Tercera División home draw against Club Portugalete.

Martín first appeared with the reserves on 16 February 2020, playing the full 90 minutes in a 2–4 home loss against Barakaldo CF in the Segunda División B championship. He renewed his contract until 2023 on 1 July, and featured in 18 matches during the campaign as the B-side returned to Segunda División after 59 years.

Martín made his professional debut on 4 September 2021, coming on as a second-half substitute for Naïs Djouahra in a 0–1 away loss against FC Cartagena. He first appeared with the main squad the following 17 February, replacing fellow youth graduate Mikel Oyarzabal late into a 2–2 UEFA Europa League away draw against RB Leipzig.

Martín made his La Liga debut on 20 February 2022, replacing Portu in a 0–4 Basque derby loss to Athletic Bilbao. On 30 June 2023, he signed a three-year contract with second division side Burgos CF.

On 30 August 2024, Martín was loaned to fellow second division side CD Mirandés for the season. Upon returning, he terminated his link with Burgos on 1 September 2025.
