= Jokin Aperribay =

Spanish businessman (born 1966)

President of Real Sociedad
- Assuming office 22 December 2008
- Succeeding: Iñaki Badiola

Personal details
- Born: 27 May 1966 (age 60) Deba, Spain
- Occupation: Businessman

Jokin Aperribay (born 27 May 1966) has been president of Real Sociedad since 2008. He succeeded Iñaki Badiola. Jokin Aperribay is the son of Joaquín Aperribay Elosua, vice president of Real Sociedad during the era of Iñaki Alkiza (1983–1992).
