= Jon Garro =

Spanish footballer (born 2005)

Personal information
- Full name: Jon Garro Larrarte
- Date of birth: 10 June 2005 (age 21)
- Place of birth: Zarautz, Spain
- Height: 1.85 m (6 ft 1 in)
- Positions: Right-back; winger

Team information
- Current team: Real Sociedad B
- Number: 2

Youth career
- Zarautz

Senior career*
| Years | Team | Apps | (Gls) |
| 2023–2025 | Real Sociedad C | 63 | (2) |
| 2025– | Real Sociedad B | 22 | (0) |
- * Club domestic league appearances and goals as of 9 June 2026

Jon Garro Larrarte (born 10 June 2005) is a Spanish footballer who plays as either a right-back or a right winger for Real Sociedad B.

== Career ==
Born in Zarautz, Gipuzkoa, Basque Country, Garro began his career with hometown side Zarautz KE before joining Real Sociedad in 2023; he was immediately assigned to the C-team in Segunda Federación. He made his senior debut with the side on 3 September of that year, starting in a 1–0 home win over CD Valle de Egüés.

After becoming a regular starter with the C's, Garro first appeared with the reserves on 18 January 2025, coming on as a late substitute for Tomy Carbonell a 1–1 Primera Federación home draw against Gimnàstic de Tarragona. He featured in four further matches for Sanse during the season, all as a substitute, as the club achieved promotion to Segunda División.

After starting the 2025 pre-season with the B-team, Garro made his professional debut on 24 August of that year, replacing Unax Agote in a 1–0 Segunda División away loss to Málaga CF.
