= Pello Arana =

Spanish footballer (born 2006)

Personal information
- Full name: Pello Arana Mugueta
- Date of birth: 11 August 2006 (age 20)
- Place of birth: Loiu, Spain
- Position: Full-back

Team information
- Current team: Real Sociedad C
- Number: 18

Youth career
- 2015–2016: Romo
- 2016–2020: Athletic Bilbao
- 2020–2024: Danok Bat
- 2024–2025: Real Sociedad

Senior career*
Years	Team	Apps	(Gls)
2025–	Real Sociedad C	26	(1)
2026–	Real Sociedad B	1	(0)
- * Club domestic league appearances and goals as of 24 May 2026

Pello Arana Mugueta (born 11 August 2006) is a Spanish footballer who plays as a full-back on either flanks for Real Sociedad C.

== Career ==
Born in Loiu, Biscay, Basque Country, Arana joined Athletic Bilbao's Lezama in 2016, from Romo FC. He left the club in 2020, and spent four years at Danok Bat CF before signing for Real Sociedad on 30 May 2024.

Arana made his senior debut with the C-team on 21 September 2025, playing the last 10 minutes of a 3–0 Tercera Federación away win over CD Aurrerá de Vitoria. He scored his first goal on 29 March of the following year, netting the C's second in a 2–0 home success over Pasaia KE.

Regularly used with the C-side, Arana made his professional debut with the reserves on 24 May 2026, coming on as a late substitute for Unax Agote in a 3–1 Segunda División loss at Albacete Balompié.
