= Javier Soroeta =

Spanish footballer (born 2005)

Personal information
- Full name: Francisco Javier Soroeta Rodríguez
- Date of birth: 16 February 2005 (age 21)
- Place of birth: San Sebastián, Spain
- Height: 1.85 m (6 ft 1 in)
- Position: Forward

Team information
- Current team: Real Sociedad B
- Number: 19

Youth career
- Real Sociedad
- Antiguoko
- 2022–2023: Real Sociedad

Senior career*
Years	Team	Apps	(Gls)
2023–2025	Real Sociedad C	17	(3)
2023–2024	→ Pasaia (loan)	32	(11)
2025	Real Sociedad B	1	(0)
2025–2026	Real Unión	28	(15)
2026–	Real Sociedad B	1	(0)
- * Club domestic league appearances and goals as of 14 August 2026

Francisco Javier Soroeta Rodríguez (born 16 February 2005) is a Spanish footballer who plays as a forward for Real Sociedad B.

== Career ==
Born in San Sebastián, Gipuzkoa, Basque Country, Soroeta impressed while playing for Antiguoko, which led to interest from Athletic Bilbao, CA Osasuna and Real Sociedad. He eventually signed for the latter in 2022, but made his senior debut while on loan at Tercera Federación side Pasaia KE the following year.

Back to the Zubieta Facilities in July 2024, Soroeta was assigned to the C-team also in the fifth division, before first appearing with the reserves on 19 April 2025, in a 1–0 Primera Federación away loss to CD Lugo. It was his maiden appearance for the B's as the side achieved promotion to Segunda División.

On 7 August 2025, Soroeta signed for Real Unión in the fourth division. He was the top scorer of the side during the campaign, scoring 15 goals and achieving promotion to the third tier.

On 10 June 2026, Real Sociedad announced Soroeta's return to the club on a two-year deal, after activating his buy-back clause; he was assigned to the B-side now in division two. He made his professional debut on 14 August, coming on as a late substitute for Gorka Gorosabel in a 1–0 home loss to CD Castellón.
