= 2026–27 Real Sociedad season =

Real Sociedad 2026–27 football season

Real Sociedad
2026–27 season
- President: Jokin Aperribay
- Head coach: Pellegrino Matarazzo
- Stadium: Anoeta Stadium
- La Liga: 5th
- Copa del Rey: Round of 32
- Supercopa de España: Semi-finals
- UEFA Europa League: League phase
- Top goalscorer: League: Luka Sučić (4); All: Luka Sučić; Orri Óskarsson (6)
- Highest home attendance: 33,664 vs Deportivo A Coruña
- Lowest home attendance: 30,035 vs Levante
- Average home league attendance: 31,328
- Biggest win: 6–0 (A) vs Lillestrøm
- Biggest defeat: 1–4 (A) vs Real Madrid; 0–3 (H) vs Atlético Madrid
Home colours	Away colours	Third colours

The 2026–27 season is the 117th season in the history of Real Sociedad, and the club's 17th consecutive season in La Liga. In addition to the domestic league, the club is participating in the Copa del Rey, the Supercopa de España and UEFA Europa League, having qualified for the latter two competitions by winning the 2025–26 Copa del Rey.

The season is the first since 2014–15 without Aritz Elustondo, who left on a free transfer to Super League Greece club PAOK.

== Players ==
=== First team squad ===
As of 5 September 2026

Note: Flags indicate national team as defined under FIFA eligibility rules; some limited exceptions apply. Players may hold more than one non-FIFA nationality.

No.	Pos.	Nation	Player
1	GK	ESP	Álex Remiro
2	DF	VEN	Jon Aramburu
3	DF	ESP	Aihen Muñoz
4	MF	ESP	Jon Gorrotxategi
5	DF	ESP	Igor Zubeldia (3rd captain)
6	DF	ESP	Jon Martín
7	FW	ESP	Ander Barrenetxea
8	MF	ESP	Beñat Turrientes
9	FW	ISL	Orri Óskarsson
10	FW	ESP	Mikel Oyarzabal (captain)
11	FW	POR	Gonçalo Guedes
12	FW	KEN	Job Ochieng

No.	Pos.	Nation	Player
13	GK	ESP	Unai Marrero
14	FW	JPN	Takefusa Kubo
15	MF	ESP	Pablo Marín
16	DF	ESP	Jon Pacheco
17	MF	ESP	Sergio Gómez
18	MF	ESP	Carlos Soler
19	DF	SEN	Mamadou Sarr (on loan from Chelsea)
20	DF	ESP	Álvaro Odriozola (vice captain)
21	MF	VEN	Yangel Herrera
22	DF	ESP	Héctor Fort
23	MF	RUS	Arsen Zakharyan
24	MF	CRO	Luka Sučić

=== Reserve ===
Note: Flags indicate national team as defined under FIFA eligibility rules; some limited exceptions apply. Players may hold more than one non-FIFA nationality.

No.	Pos.	Nation	Player
26	DF	ESP	Ibai Aguirre
—	FW	ESP	Gorka Carrera
29	DF	ESP	Alex Marchal
32	GK	ESP	Aitor Fraga

No.	Pos.	Nation	Player
33	DF	ESP	Iñaki Rupérez
—	DF	ESP	Luken Beitia
—	MF	FRA	Alex Lebarbier
44	GK	FRA	Theo Folgado

=== Out on loan ===
Note: Flags indicate national team as defined under FIFA eligibility rules; some limited exceptions apply. Players may hold more than one non-FIFA nationality.

No.	Pos.	Nation	Player
—	DF	ESP	Javi López (at Feyenoord until 30 June 2027)
—	MF	ESP	Mikel Goti (at Oviedo until 30 June 2027)

== Transfers ==
=== In ===
Date	Pos.	Player	From	Fee	Ref.
29 August 2026	DF	(Spain) Héctor Fort	(Spain) Barcelona	€8,500,000	
30 August 2026	MF	(Senegal) Mamadou Sarr	(England) Chelsea	Loan	

=== Out ===
Date	Pos.	Player	To	Fee	Ref.
1 July 2026	DF	(Spain) Aritz Elustondo	(Greece) PAOK	Free	
2 July 2026	MF	(Spain) Brais Méndez	(United States) Columbus Crew	€6,000,000	
17 August 2026	DF	(Spain) Javi López	(Netherlands) Feyenoord	Loan	
28 August 2026	MF	(Spain) Jon Karrikaburu	(Spain) Burgos	€1,500,000	
1 September 2026	MF	(Spain) Mikel Goti	(Spain) Oviedo	Loan	

== Pre-season and friendlies ==
18 July 2026 1	Real Sociedad	1–1	Racing Santander	Zubieta, Spain
18:00 UTC+2	Óskarsson 19'	Report	Gabriel 82'	Stadium: Campo José Luis Orbegozo
Note: The match was played behind closed doors

25 July 2026 2	Wolverhampton Wanderers	1–2	Real Sociedad	Walsall, England
17:00 UTC+1	Gomes 17'	Report	Óskarsson 34'; Lebarbier 83'	Stadium: Bescot Stadium

28 July 2026 3	Aston Villa	2–4	Real Sociedad	Walsall, England
19:30 UTC+1	Hemmings 14'; Madjo 56'	Report	Soler 22'; Óskarsson 53'; Carrera 66'; Rupérez 88'	Stadium: Bescot Stadium

31 July 2026 4	Toulouse	2–1	Real Sociedad	Tarbes, France
19:00 UTC+2	Vignolo 31'; Hidalgo 45'	Report	Soler 33'	Stadium: Stade Maurice Trélut; Attendance: 1,300

7 August 2026 5	Köln	2–0	Real Sociedad	Cologne, Germany
18:00 UTC+2	Waldschmidt 74'; Bülter 82'	Report		Stadium: Franz-Kremer-Stadion; Attendance: 0
Note: The match was played behind closed doors

8 August 2026 6	Köln	2–1	Real Sociedad	Cologne, Germany
15:30 UTC+2	Maina 5'; Yacobi 78'	Report	Lochoshvili 10' (o.g.)	Stadium: RheinEnergieStadion; Attendance: 37,000; Referee: Tom Bauer

15 August 2026 7	Chelsea	3–1	Real Sociedad	London, England
14:00 UTC+1	Rogers 10'; Pedro 46', 76'	Report	Aramburu 44'	Stadium: Stamford Bridge; Attendance: 34,715; Referee: Andrew Madley

=== Euskal Herriko Futbol Txapelketa ===
2 October 2026 Final	Real Sociedad	0–1	Athletic Bilbao	San Sebastián
19:00 CEST (UTC+2)		Report	Sannadi 58'	Stadium: Anoeta; Attendance: 9,678; Referee: Luis Bestard

== Competitions ==
Competition	First match	Last match	Starting round	Final position	Record							
Competition	First match	Last match	Starting round	Final position	Pld	W	D	L	GF	GA	GD	Win %
La Liga	21 August 2026	28–30 May 2027	Matchday 1	TBD	13	7	1	5	23	23	+0	53.85
Copa del Rey	15–17 December 2026	TBD	Round of 32	TBD	0	0	0	0	0	0	+0	—
Supercopa de España	2–3 February 2027	February 2027	Semi-finals	TBD	0	0	0	0	0	0	+0	—
UEFA Europa League	17 September 2026	TBD	Matchday 1	TBD	4	1	2	1	9	4	+5	25.00
Total					17	8	3	6	32	27	+5	47.06

Last updated: 18 October 2026
Source: Soccerway

=== La Liga ===
==== League table ====
Pos	Team	Pld	W	D	L	GF	GA	GD	Pts	Qualification or relegation
3	Atlético Madrid	12	9	1	2	23	10	+13	28	Qualification for the UEFA Champions League league phase
4	Real Betis	13	8	3	2	21	16	+5	27	Qualification for the UEFA Champions League league phase
5	Real Sociedad	13	7	1	5	23	23	0	22	Qualification for the UEFA Europa League league phase
6	Sevilla	13	5	4	4	18	20	−2	19	Qualification for the UEFA Conference League play-off round
7	Racing Santander	13	5	2	6	20	32	−12	17	

Updated to match(es) played on 22 November 2026. Source: LaLiga EA Sports
Rules for classification: 1) Points; 2) Head-to-head points; 3) Head-to-head goal difference; 4) Goal difference; 5) Goals scored; 6) Fair-play points (if three or more teams tied); 7) Play-off at neutral site.
(Note: Head-to-head record is used only after all the matches between the teams in question have been played)

==== Results summary ====
Overall								Home						Away					
Pld	W	D	L	GF	GA	GD	Pts	W	D	L	GF	GA	GD	W	D	L	GF	GA	GD
13	7	1	5	23	23	0	22	4	1	1	8	7	+1	3	0	4	15	16	−1

Last updated: 1 November 2026.
Source: La Liga

==== Results by round ====
Round	2	1	3	6	4	5	7	8	9	10	11	12	13	14	15	16	17	18	19	20	21	22	23	24	25	26	27	28	29	30	31	32	33	34	35	36	37	38
Ground	A	A	H	H	A	H	A	H	A	H	A	H	A	H	A	H	A	H	A	A	H	A	H	H	A	H	A	A	H	H	A	H	A	H	A	H	A	H
Result	L	L	W	D	W	L	W	W	W	W	L	W	L																									
Position	18	20	13	14	11	12	8	6	5	5	5	5																										

Updated to match(es) played on 1 November 2026. Source: La Liga
A = Away; H = Home; W = Win; D = Draw; L = Loss

==== Matches ====
The match schedule was released on 30 June 2026.

21 August 2026 2	Real Betis	1–0	Real Sociedad	Seville
21:00 CEST (UTC+2)	Riquelme 63'; Natan (yellow card) 80'; F. García (yellow card) 90'; Bellerín (yellow card) 90+2'	Report	Gómez (yellow card) 46'; Aramburu (yellow card) 49'; Zubeldia (yellow card) 61'	Stadium: La Cartuja; Attendance: 59,490; Referee: Isidro Díaz De Mera Escuderos

26 August 2026 1	Real Madrid	4–1	Real Sociedad	Madrid
21:00 CEST (UTC+2)	Mbappé 40', 60', 80'; Vinícius 68'	Report	Sučić 44'	Stadium: Bernabéu; Attendance: 72,226; Referee: Mateo Busquets Ferrer
Note: The match date was pushed back due to the clubs' player's involvement in the 2026 FIFA World Cup.

29 August 2026 3	Real Sociedad	2–1	Espanyol	San Sebastián
19:00 CEST (UTC+2)	Barrenetxea 4'; Óskarsson 61'	Report	Fernández 45'	Stadium: Anoeta; Attendance: 31,884; Referee: Manuel Jesús Orellana Cid

3 September 2026 6	Real Sociedad	0–0	Celta Vigo	San Sebastián
21:00 CEST (UTC+2)		Report		Stadium: Anoeta; Attendance: 30,364; Referee: Víctor García Verdura

7 September 2026 4	Elche	2–3	Real Sociedad	Elche
21:30 CEST (UTC+2)	Lemar 67'; Niño 74'	Report	Ochieng 11'; Herrera 32'; Martín (red card) 64'; Sučić 90'	Stadium: Estadio Martínez Valero; Attendance: 25,562; Referee: Miguel Ángel Ortiz Arias

13 September 2026 5	Real Sociedad	0–3	Atlético Madrid	San Sebastián
21:00 CEST (UTC+2)	Herrera (yellow card) 18'; Oyarzabal (yellow card) 78'	Report	Cardoso (yellow card) 75'; Grimaldo 84' (pen.); David 90'; Simeone 90+5'	Stadium: Anoeta; Attendance: 31,384; Referee: Juan Martínez Munuera

20 September 2026 7	Valencia	2–3	Real Sociedad	Valencia
21:00 CEST (UTC+2)	De Haas (yellow card) 11'; Gayà (yellow card) 12'; Mayol 57'; Beitia 84' (o.g.)	Report	Sučić 26', (yellow card) 54'; Soler 75' (pen.); Barrenetxea 90+1'; Óskarsson (yellow card) 90+6' (yellow-red card) 90+6'	Stadium: Mestalla; Attendance: 45,122; Referee: José Luis Munuera Montero

11 October 2026 8	Real Sociedad	3–2	Deportivo A Coruña	San Sebastián
14:15 CEST (UTC+2)	Martín 29'; Zakharyan 34'; Guedes 54'; Marín (red card) 66'; Herrera (yellow card) 90+4'	Report	Mella (yellow card) 40'; Soriano 61'; Hernández 69' (pen.); Giménez (yellow card) 71'; Amatucci (red card) 90'	Stadium: Anoeta; Attendance: 33,644; Referee: Miguel Sesma Espinosa

18 October 2026 9	Málaga	2–5	Real Sociedad	Málaga
16:30 CEST (UTC+2)	Niño 54'; Martínez 66'	Report	Kubo 3'; Óskarsson 26'; Martín (yellow card) 37'; Oyarzabal 59', 67'; Sarr (yellow card) 62'; Guedes 73'	Stadium: La Rosaleda; Attendance: 27,935; Referee: Luis Bestard Servera

25 October 2026 10	Real Sociedad	2–1	Levante	San Sebastián
18:30 CET (UTC+1)	Óskarsson 6'; Turrientes 27'; Martín (yellow card) 64'	Report	Pérez 22'; Sánchez (yellow card) 75'; Musuayi (yellow card) 81'; García (yellow card) 87'	Stadium: Anoeta; Attendance: 30,035; Referee: Javier Alberola Rojas

1 November 2026 11	Athletic Bilbao	2–1	Real Sociedad	Bilbao
21:00 CET (UTC+1)	Williams 14', (yellow card) 45+4'; Berenguer 45+2' (pen.); Rincón (yellow card) 84'	Report	Sučić 30'; Oyarzabal (yellow card) 55'; Sarr (yellow card) 64'; Aramburu (yellow card) 74'	Stadium: San Mamés; Attendance: 50,092; Referee: Alejandro Hernández Hernández

8 November 2026 12	Real Sociedad	1–0	Rayo Vallecano	San Sebastián
16:15 CET (UTC+1)	Zubeldia (yellow card) 50'; Turrientes (yellow card) 61'; Óskarsson 67'	Report	Tsitaishvili (yellow card) 34'; Bouare (yellow card) 88'	Stadium: Anoeta; Attendance: 30,638; Referee: Juan Martínez Munuera

22 November 2026 13	Racing Santander	3–2	Real Sociedad	Santander
16:15 CET (UTC+1)	Zabiri 6', 8'; Canales 68' (pen.)	Report	Oyarzabal 45+1'; Guedes 60'	Stadium: El Sardinero; Attendance: 22,308; Referee: Manuel Jesús Orellana Cid

29 November 2026 14	Real Sociedad	v	Sevilla	San Sebastián
--:-- UTC+1				Stadium: Anoeta

6 December 2026 15	Villarreal	v	Real Sociedad	Villarreal
--:-- UTC+1				Stadium: Estadio de la Cerámica

13 December 2026 16	Real Sociedad	v	Getafe	San Sebastián
--:-- UTC+1				Stadium: Anoeta

20 December 2026 17	Barcelona	v	Real Sociedad	Barcelona
--:-- UTC+1				Stadium: Camp Nou

3 January 2027 18	Real Sociedad	v	Osasuna	San Sebastián
--:-- UTC+1				Stadium: Anoeta

10 January 2027 19	Alavés	v	Real Sociedad	Vitoria-Gasteiz
--:-- UTC+1				Stadium: Mendizorrotza

17 January 2027 20	Atlético Madrid	v	Real Sociedad	Madrid
--:-- UTC+1				Stadium: Metropolitano

24 January 2027 21	Real Sociedad	v	Málaga	San Sebastián
--:-- UTC+1				Stadium: Anoeta

31 January 2027 22	Levante	v	Real Sociedad	Valencia
--:-- UTC+1				Stadium: Estadi Ciutat de València

7 February 2027 23	Real Sociedad	v	Real Madrid	San Sebastián
--:-- UTC+1				Stadium: Anoeta

14 February 2027 24	Real Sociedad	v	Betis	San Sebastián
--:-- UTC+1				Stadium: Anoeta

21 February 2027 25	Deportivo A Coruña	v	Real Sociedad	A Coruña
--:-- UTC+1				Stadium: Riazor

28 February 2027 26	Real Sociedad	v	Elche	San Sebastián
--:-- UTC+1				Stadium: Anoeta

7 March 2027 27	Sevilla	v	Real Sociedad	Seville
--:-- UTC+1				Stadium: Ramón Sánchez-Pizjuán

14 March 2027 28	Getafe	v	Real Sociedad	Getafe
--:-- UTC+1				Stadium: Estadio Coliseum

21 March 2027 29	Real Sociedad	v	Alavés	San Sebastián
--:-- UTC+1				Stadium: Anoeta

4 April 2027 30	Real Sociedad	v	Valencia	San Sebastián
--:-- UTC+2				Stadium: Anoeta

11 April 2027 31	Rayo Vallecano	v	Real Sociedad	Leganés
--:-- UTC+2				Stadium: Butarque

18 April 2027 32	Real Sociedad	v	Racing Santander	San Sebastián
--:-- UTC+2				Stadium: Anoeta

21 April 2027 33	Espanyol	v	Real Sociedad	Cornellà de Llobregat
--:-- UTC+2				Stadium: Estadi Cornellà-El Prat

2 May 2027 34	Real Sociedad	v	Athletic Bilbao	San Sebastián
--:-- UTC+2				Stadium: Anoeta

9 May 2027 35	Osasuna	v	Real Sociedad	Pamplona
--:-- UTC+2				Stadium: El Sadar

16 May 2027 36	Real Sociedad	v	Barcelona	San Sebastián
--:-- UTC+2				Stadium: Anoeta

23 May 2027 37	Celta Vigo	v	Real Sociedad	Vigo
--:-- UTC+2				Stadium: Balaídos

30 May 2027 38	Real Sociedad	v	Villarreal	San Sebastián
--:-- UTC+2				Stadium: Anoeta

=== Copa del Rey ===
Sociedad will enter the tournament in the round of 32, as they qualified for the 2027 Supercopa de España.

=== Supercopa de España ===
2 February 2027 Semi-finals	Real Sociedad	v	Real Madrid	Istanbul, Turkey
--:-- UTC+3				Stadium: Atatürk Olympic Stadium

=== UEFA Europa League ===
==== League phase ====
The draw for the league phase took place on 28 August 2026.

Pos	Team	Pld	W	D	L	GF	GA	GD	Pts	Qualification
18	(Cyprus) Omonia	4	2	0	2	6	7	−1	6	Advance to knockout phase play-offs (unseeded)
19	(Portugal) Torreense	4	2	0	2	7	9	−2	6	Advance to knockout phase play-offs (unseeded)
20	(Spain) Real Sociedad	4	1	2	1	9	4	+5	5	Advance to knockout phase play-offs (unseeded)
21	(England) Crystal Palace	4	1	2	1	9	6	+3	5	Advance to knockout phase play-offs (unseeded)
22	(Czech Republic) Sparta Prague	4	1	1	2	6	6	0	4	Advance to knockout phase play-offs (unseeded)

Updated to match(es) played on 5 November 2026. Source: UEFA
Rules for classification: League phase tiebreakers

Round	1	2	3	4	5	6	7	8
Ground	H	A	A	H	A	H	H	A
Result	L	D	W	D				
Position	22	22	14	20				
Points	0	1	4	5				

Updated to match(es) played on 5 November 2026. Source: UEFA
A = Away; H = Home; W = Win; D = Draw; L = Loss

17 September 2026 1	Real Sociedad (Spain)	1–2	(England) Bournemouth	San Sebastián, Spain
21:00 CEST (UTC+2)	Turrientes (yellow card) 24'; Barrenetxea (yellow card) 33'; Gómez 57'; Óskarsson (yellow card) 75'	Report	Kluivert 11', (yellow card) 43'; Rayan 20'; Truffert (yellow card) 52'; Diakité (yellow card) 70'	Stadium: Anoeta; Attendance: 30,020; Referee: Paweł Raczkowski (Poland)

15 October 2026 2	Union Saint-Gilloise (Belgium)	1–1	(Spain) Real Sociedad	Leuven, Belgium
18:45 CEST (UTC+2)	Chibani (yellow card) 58'; Guilherme Smith (yellow card) 73'; Keita 88'	Report	Turrientes 46'; Sarr (yellow card) 74'	Stadium: Den Dreef (Note: Union Saint-Gilloise will play their home matches at Den Dreef, Leuven, instead of their regular stadium, Joseph Marien Stadium, Brussels, which does not meet UEFA requirements.); Referee: Goga Kikacheishvili (Georgia)

22 October 2026 3	Lillestrøm (Norway)	0–6	(Spain) Real Sociedad	Lillestrøm, Norway
21:00 CEST (UTC+2)	Olsen (penalty missed) 50'; Gabrielsen (yellow card) 52'	Report	Gómez 25', 27'; Sarr (yellow card) 30'; Sučić 33', 72'; Gorrotxategi (yellow card) 56'; Óskarsson 64'; Zakharyan 80'	Stadium: Åråsen Stadion; Referee: Mohammad Al-Emara (Finland)

5 November 2026 4	Real Sociedad (Spain)	1–1	(France) Lyon	San Sebastián, Spain
18:45 CET (UTC+1)	Óskarsson 28'; Guedes (yellow card) 61'; Barrenetxea (yellow card) 77'; Herrera (yellow card) 89'	Report	Boudache (yellow card) 38'; Tolisso 54'; Duranville (yellow card) 82'; Greif (yellow card) 87'; Abner (yellow card) 90+1'	Stadium: Anoeta; Referee: Anastasios Papapetrou (Greece)

26 November 2026 5	Crystal Palace (England)	v	(Spain) Real Sociedad	London, England
20:00 GMT (UTC+0)		Report		Stadium: Selhurst Park

10 December 2026 6	Real Sociedad (Spain)	v	(Portugal) Torreense	San Sebastián, Spain
21:00 CET (UTC+1)		Report		Stadium: Anoeta

21 January 2027 7	Real Sociedad (Spain)	v	(Czech Republic) Viktoria Plzeň	San Sebastián, Spain
18:45 CET (UTC+1)		Report		Stadium: Anoeta

28 January 2027 8	Juventus (Italy)	v	(Spain) Real Sociedad	Turin, Italy
21:00 CET (UTC+1)		Report		Stadium: Juventus Stadium

== Statistics ==
No.	Pos	Nat	Player	Total		La Liga		Copa del Rey		Supercopa de España		Europa League	
No.	Pos	Nat	Player	Apps	Goals	Apps	Goals	Apps	Goals	Apps	Goals	Apps	Goals
Goalkeepers
1	GK	(Spain) ESP	Alex Remiro	0	0	0	0	0	0	0	0	0	0
13	GK	(Spain) ESP	Unai Marrero	0	0	0	0	0	0	0	0	0	0
Defenders
2	DF	(Venezuela) VEN	Jon Aramburu	0	0	0	0	0	0	0	0	0	0
3	DF	(Spain) ESP	Aihen Muñoz	0	0	0	0	0	0	0	0	0	0
5	DF	(Spain) ESP	Igor Zubeldia	0	0	0	0	0	0	0	0	0	0
6	DF	(Spain) ESP	Jon Martín	0	0	0	0	0	0	0	0	0	0
16	DF	(Spain) ESP	Jon Pacheco	0	0	0	0	0	0	0	0	0	0
20	DF	(Spain) ESP	Álvaro Odriozola	0	0	0	0	0	0	0	0	0	0
22	DF	(Spain) ESP	Héctor Fort	0	0	0	0	0	0	0	0	0	0
Midfielders
4	MF	(Spain) ESP	Jon Gorrotxategi	0	0	0	0	0	0	0	0	0	0
8	MF	(Spain) ESP	Beñat Turrientes	0	0	0	0	0	0	0	0	0	0
15	MF	(Spain) ESP	Pablo Marín	0	0	0	0	0	0	0	0	0	0
17	MF	(Spain) ESP	Sergio Gómez	0	0	0	0	0	0	0	0	0	0
18	MF	(Spain) ESP	Carlos Soler	0	0	0	0	0	0	0	0	0	0
19	MF	(Senegal) SEN	Mamadou Sarr	0	0	0	0	0	0	0	0	0	0
21	MF	(Venezuela) VEN	Yangel Herrera	0	0	0	0	0	0	0	0	0	0
23	MF	(Russia) RUS	Arsen Zakharyan	0	0	0	0	0	0	0	0	0	0
24	MF	(Croatia) CRO	Luka Sučić	0	0	0	0	0	0	0	0	0	0
Forwards
7	FW	(Spain) ESP	Ander Barrenetxea	0	0	0	0	0	0	0	0	0	0
9	FW	(Iceland) ISL	Orri Óskarsson	0	0	0	0	0	0	0	0	0	0
10	FW	(Spain) ESP	Mikel Oyarzabal	0	0	0	0	0	0	0	0	0	0
11	FW	(Portugal) POR	Gonçalo Guedes	0	0	0	0	0	0	0	0	0	0
12	FW	(Kenya) KEN	Job Ochieng	0	0	0	0	0	0	0	0	0	0
14	FW	(Japan) JPN	Takefusa Kubo	0	0	0	0	0	0	0	0	0	0
Players who have made an appearance this season but have left the club
