= Lander Olasagasti =

Spanish footballer (born 2004)

Personal information
- Full name: Lander Olasagasti Guillén
- Date of birth: 26 March 2004 (age 22)
- Place of birth: San Sebastián, Spain
- Height: 1.85 m (6 ft 1 in)
- Position: Goalkeeper

Team information
- Current team: Real Sociedad B
- Number: 32

Youth career
- 2016–2023: Real Sociedad

Senior career*
Years	Team	Apps	(Gls)
2023–2026	Real Sociedad C	28	(0)
2026–	Real Sociedad B	1	(0)
- * Club domestic league appearances and goals as of 24 October 2026

Lander Olasagasti Guillén (born 26 March 2004) is a Spanish footballer who plays as a goalkeeper for Real Sociedad B.

== Career ==
Born in San Sebastián, Gipuzkoa, Basque Country, Olasagasti joined Real Sociedad's youth sides in 2016, aged 12. He made his senior debut with the C-team on 18 February 2023, starting in a 1–0 Segunda Federación away loss to Gernika Club.

A backup option and struggling with injuries in the following years, Olasagasti spent the 2025–26 season as a fourth-choice in the reserves in Segunda División, behind Aitor Fraga, Egoitz Arana and Theo Folgado. He made his professional debut with the B's on 24 October 2026, starting in a 1–0 away loss to UD Las Palmas.
