= Egoitz Arana =

Spanish footballer (born 2002)

Personal information
- Full name: Egoitz Arana Aizpuru
- Date of birth: 19 February 2002 (age 24)
- Place of birth: Zarautz, Spain
- Height: 1.97 m (6 ft 6 in)
- Position: Goalkeeper

Team information
- Current team: Sporting Gijón

Youth career
- 2013–2014: Zarautz
- 2014–2019: Real Sociedad

Senior career*
Years	Team	Apps	(Gls)
2019	Real Sociedad C	1	(0)
2019–2020	Anaitasuna	7	(0)
2020–2022	Real Sociedad C	15	(0)
2022–2023	Real Sociedad B	4	(0)
2023–2024	San Fernando	1	(0)
2024–2026	Real Sociedad B	16	(0)
2026–	Sporting Gijón	0	(0)
- * Club domestic league appearances and goals as of 31 May 2026

Egoitz Arana Aizpuru (born 19 February 2002) is a Spanish footballer who plays as a goalkeeper for Sporting de Gijón.

== Career ==
Born in Zarautz, Gipuzkoa, Basque Country, Arana joined Real Sociedad's youth sides in 2014, from hometown side Zarautz KE. He made his senior debut with the C-team at the age of 16 on 26 January 2019, starting in a 1–1 home draw against SD Balmaseda FC.

On 6 November 2019, Arana signed for CD Anaitasuna in the División de Honor. He returned to the Txuri-urdin in August of the following year, being assigned to the C's.

Arana was promoted to the reserves ahead of the 2022–23 season, but acted as a backup to Unai Marrero. On 4 July 2023, he was announced at fellow Primera Federación side San Fernando CD.

A backup to Diego Fuoli, Arana only featured in one match before returning to Sanse on 1 July 2024. A second-choice behind Aitor Fraga during the campaign, he renewed his contract for a further year on 28 May 2025, and became the first-choice during the play-offs as Fraga was on international duty, contributing with eight appearances overall as the club achieved promotion to Segunda División.

Arana made his professional debut with the B's on 12 September 2025, starting in a 2–1 away loss to UD Las Palmas. Again a backup to Fraga, he left Real Sociedad in June 2026, and signed a two-year deal with Sporting de Gijón afterwards.
