= 2026–27 Premier League International Cup =

Tournament details
- Dates: 19 August 2026 –
- Teams: 32 (from 10 associations)

Tournament statistics
- Matches played: 28
- Goals scored: 101 (3.61 per match)
- All statistics correct as of 20 November 2026.

The 2026–27 Premier League International Cup is the eleventh season of the Premier League International Cup, a European club football competition organised by the Premier League for under-21 teams.

Borussia Dortmund were the defending champions.

== Format ==
The competition features thirty-two teams: sixteen from English league system and sixteen invitees from other European countries. The teams are split into four groups of eight. The best performing Premier League 2 club, and the best non-English club from each group will advance to the quarter-finals.

All matches will be played in England.

=== Teams ===
English league system:

- (England) Aston Villa
- (England) Brighton & Hove Albion
- (England) Crystal Palace
- (England) Everton
- (England) Fulham
- (England) Ipswich Town
- (England) Leicester City
- (England) Manchester City
- (England) Manchester United
- (England) Middlesbrough
- (England) Nottingham Forest
- (England) Southampton
- (England) Stoke City
- (England) Sunderland
- (England) Tottenham Hotspur
- (England) West Ham United

Other countries:

- (Italy) AC Milan
- (Belgium) Anderlecht
- (Germany) Borussia Dortmund
- (Germany) Borussia Mönchengladbach
- (Denmark) Brøndby
- (Croatia) Dinamo Zagreb
- (Belgium) Genk
- (Italy) Juventus
- (France) Monaco
- (Denmark) Nordsjælland
- (France) Paris Saint-Germain
- (Portugal) Porto
- (Netherlands) PSV Eindhoven
- (Spain) Real Sociedad
- (Portugal) Sporting CP
- (Spain) Valencia

== Group stage ==
The group stage draw took place on 12 August 2026.

=== Group A ===
Pos	Team	Pld	W	D	L	GF	GA	GD	Pts
1	(England) Middlesbrough	3	2	1	0	5	3	+2	7
2	(France) Monaco	2	2	0	0	8	3	+5	6
3	(England) West Ham United	3	2	0	1	6	6	0	6
4	(Belgium) Genk	1	0	1	0	1	1	0	1
5	(England) Southampton	1	0	1	0	1	1	0	1
6	(Italy) Juventus	3	0	1	2	2	5	−3	1
7	(England) Manchester United	1	0	0	1	2	3	−1	0
8	(Spain) Valencia	2	0	0	2	2	5	−3	0

Updated to match(es) played on 11 November 2026. Source: Premier League

23 September 2026	Middlesbrough (England)	1–1	(Belgium) Genk	Middlesbrough
19:00 BST (UTC+1)	Tika-Lemba 90+5'	Report	Pierre 20'	Stadium: Riverside Stadium; Referee: Adam Merchant

23 September 2026	West Ham United (England)	2–0	(Spain) Valencia	Dagenham
19:00 BST (UTC+1)	Kerr 71', 90+2' (pen.)	Report		Stadium: Chigwell Construction Stadium; Referee: Dan Baines

30 September 2026	Middlesbrough (England)	1–0	(Italy) Juventus	Middlesbrough
19:00 BST (UTC+1)	Campbell 84'	Report		Stadium: Riverside Stadium; Referee: George Smith

20 October 2026	Southampton (England)	1–1	(Italy) Juventus	Southampton
19:00 BST	Ehibhatiomhan 7'	Report	Marchisio 68'	Stadium: St Mary's Stadium; Attendance: 7,767; Referee: Tolu Sangowawa

20 October 2026	West Ham United (England)	1–5	(France) Monaco	Dagenham
19:00 BST (UTC+1)	Medine 64'	Report	Assab 7', 21'; Sylla 9'; Benzahra 48'; Haddani 81'	Stadium: Chigwell Construction Stadium; Referee: Carl Baker

30 October 2026	Manchester United (England)	2–3	(France) Monaco	Leigh
19:00 GMT	Stawiecki 53' (o.g.); Kana-Biyik 90+4'	Report	Byrne-Hughes 4' (o.g.); Bein 13'; Dodo 63'	Stadium: Leigh Sports Village; Referee: George Smith

3 November 2026	Middlesbrough (England)	3–2	(Spain) Valencia	Middlesbrough
19:00 GMT	Ibeh 45+1'; McCabe 48'; Okunola 55'	Report	Tika-Lemba 8' (o.g.); Gómez 77'	Stadium: Riverside Stadium; Attendance: 306; Referee: Carl Baker

11 November 2026	West Ham United (England)	3–1	(Italy) Juventus	Dagenham
19:00 GMT	Montague 31'; Omotoye 58'; Medine 90+1' (pen.)	Report	Tiozzo 45'	Stadium: Chigwell Construction Stadium; Referee: Liam Trotter

2 December 2026	Manchester United (England)	v	(Italy) Juventus
19:00 GMT

3 December 2026	Middlesbrough (England)	v	(France) Monaco
19:00 GMT

8 December 2026	Southampton (England)	v	(Spain) Valencia
19:00 GMT

9 December 2026	West Ham United (England)	v	(Belgium) Genk	Dagenham
19:00 GMT				Stadium: Chigwell Construction Stadium

16 December 2026	Manchester United (England)	v	(Belgium) Genk
19:00 GMT

19 January 2027	Southampton (England)	v	(Belgium) Genk
19:00 GMT

27 January 2027	Manchester United (England)	v	(Spain) Valencia
19:00 GMT

27 January 2027	Southampton (England)	v	(France) Monaco
19:00 GMT

=== Group B ===
Pos	Team	Pld	W	D	L	GF	GA	GD	Pts
1	(Germany) Borussia Mönchengladbach	2	1	1	0	3	1	+2	4
2	(England) Tottenham Hotspur	1	1	0	0	3	1	+2	3
3	(Denmark) Nordsjælland	1	1	0	0	2	0	+2	3
4	(Italy) AC Milan	1	1	0	0	2	1	+1	3
5	(England) Everton	2	0	1	1	2	3	−1	1
6	(England) Manchester City	0	0	0	0	0	0	0	0
7	(Croatia) Dinamo Zagreb	1	0	0	1	1	3	−2	0
8	(England) Stoke City	2	0	0	2	0	4	−4	0

Updated to match(es) played on 20 October 2026. Source: Premier League

2 September 2026	Everton (England)	1–2	(Italy) AC Milan	Liverpool
19:00 BST (UTC+1)	Graham 57'	Report	Colombo 26'; Ossola 77'	Stadium: Goodison Park; Referee: Carl Baker

15 September 2026	Tottenham Hotspur (England)	3–1	(Croatia) Dinamo Zagreb	Stevenage
19:00 BST (UTC+1)	Boast 67'; Lehane 80'; Williams-Barnett 86'	Report	Baković 26'	Stadium: Lamex Stadium; Attendance: 203; Referee: Carl Baker

16 September 2026	Stoke City (England)	0–2	(Germany) Borussia Mönchengladbach	Stoke-on-Trent
19:00 BST (UTC+1)		Report	Vidic 68'; Karyagdi 81'	Stadium: Bet365 Stadium; Referee: Martyn Andrews

20 October 2026	Everton (England)	1–1	(Germany) Borussia Mönchengladbach	Walton
19:00 BST (UTC+1)	Loney 35'	Report	Uwakhonye 8'	Stadium: Walton Hall Park; Referee: Zac Kennard-Kettle

20 October 2026	Stoke City (England)	0–2	(Denmark) Nordsjælland	Stoke-on-Trent
19:00 BST (UTC+1)		Report	Faber 75'; Gustafsen 82'	Stadium: Bet365 Stadium; Referee: Lewis Smith

3 November 2026	Tottenham Hotspur (England)	P–P	(Denmark) Nordsjælland	Stevenage
19:00 GMT				Stadium: Lamex Stadium

26 November 2026	Stoke City (England)	v	(Italy) AC Milan
19:00 GMT

1 December 2026	Manchester City (England)	v	(Croatia) Dinamo Zagreb
19:00 GMT

2 December 2026	Tottenham Hotspur (England)	v	(Germany) Borussia Mönchengladbach	Stevenage
19:00 GMT				Stadium: Lamex Stadium

8 December 2026	Everton (England)	v	(Denmark) Nordsjælland	Walton
19:00 GMT				Stadium: Walton Hall Park

8 December 2026	Stoke City (England)	v	(Croatia) Dinamo Zagreb
19:00 GMT

16 December 2026	Tottenham Hotspur (England)	v	(Italy) AC Milan	Stevenage
19:00 GMT				Stadium: Lamex Stadium

19 January 2027	Manchester City (England)	v	(Denmark) Nordsjælland
19:00 GMT

27 January 2027	Everton (England)	v	(Croatia) Dinamo Zagreb	Walton
19:00 GMT				Stadium: Walton Hall Park

27 January 2027	Manchester City (England)	v	(Germany) Borussia Mönchengladbach
19:00 GMT

TBC	Manchester City (England)	v	(Italy) AC Milan
TBC

=== Group C ===
Pos	Team	Pld	W	D	L	GF	GA	GD	Pts
1	(Portugal) Sporting CP	3	3	0	0	8	4	+4	9
2	(Denmark) Brøndby	1	1	0	0	4	0	+4	3
3	(Germany) Borussia Dortmund	1	1	0	0	4	1	+3	3
4	(England) Aston Villa	2	1	0	1	5	5	0	3
5	(Spain) Real Sociedad	2	1	0	1	5	5	0	3
6	(England) Nottingham Forest	1	0	0	1	2	4	−2	0
7	(England) Fulham	2	0	0	2	2	6	−4	0
8	(England) Leicester City	2	0	0	2	1	6	−5	0

Updated to match(es) played on 20 November 2026. Source: Premier League

26 August 2026	Fulham (England)	1–4	(Germany) Borussia Dortmund	New Malden
19:00 BST (UTC+1)	Sani 5'	Report	Zarqelain 25'; Albert 28'; Verlaat 52'; Lerma 57'	Stadium: Motspur Park; Attendance: 1,000; Referee: Dan Baines

2 September 2026	Aston Villa (England)	0–4	(Denmark) Brøndby	Bodymoor Heath
19:00 BST (UTC+1)		Report	Mortensen 20'; Fukuda 24'; Oliver 28'; Ekstrand 82'	Stadium: Bodymoor Heath Training Ground; Referee: Martyn Andrews

15 September 2026	Aston Villa (England)	5–1	(Spain) Real Sociedad	Bodymoor Heath
19:00 BST (UTC+1)	Meade 8'; Ropero 38' (o.g.); Blake 69', 72', 83' (pen.)	Report	Telletxea 2'	Stadium: Bodymoor Heath Training Ground; Attendance: 131; Referee: Joe Moss

30 September 2026	Leicester City (England)	0–4	(Spain) Real Sociedad	Seagrave
19:00 BST (UTC+1)		Report	Telletxea 5'; Eceizabarrena 23'; Fernández 59', 90+2'	Stadium: LCFC Training Ground; Referee: Carl Baker

30 September 2026	Nottingham Forest (England)	2–4	(Portugal) Sporting CP	Loughborough
19:00 BST (UTC+1)	Sutton 8', 25'	Report	Almeida 43', 84'; Camacho 80', 90'	Stadium: Loughborough University Stadium; Attendance: 482; Referee: Martyn Andrews

30 October 2026	Leicester City (England)	1–2	(Portugal) Sporting CP	Seagrave
19:00 GMT	King 45'	Report	Muniz 76'; Siza 80'	Stadium: LCFC Training Ground; Referee: Sam Mantom

20 November 2026	Fulham (England)	1–2	(Portugal) Sporting CP	New Malden
19:00 GMT	Zepa 88'	-	Almeida 35'; Grombahi 38'	Stadium: Motspur Park; Referee: Liam Trotter

8 December 2026	Fulham (England)	v	(Denmark) Brøndby
19:00 GMT

15 December 2026	Aston Villa (England)	v	(Germany) Borussia Dortmund	Bodymoor Heath
19:00 GMT				Stadium: Bodymoor Heath Training Ground

16 December 2026	Nottingham Forest (England)	v	(Spain) Real Sociedad
19:00 GMT

18 December 2026	Leicester City (England)	v	(Germany) Borussia Dortmund
19:00 GMT

21 December 2026	Nottingham Forest (England)	v	(Germany) Borussia Dortmund
19:00 GMT

12 January 2027	Aston Villa (England)	v	(Portugal) Sporting CP	Bodymoor Heath
19:00 GMT				Stadium: Bodymoor Heath Training Ground

26 January 2027	Leicester City (England)	v	(Denmark) Brøndby
19:00 GMT

27 January 2027	Fulham (England)	v	(Spain) Real Sociedad
19:00 GMT

9 February 2027	Nottingham Forest (England)	v	(Denmark) Brøndby
19:00 GMT

=== Group D ===
Pos	Team	Pld	W	D	L	GF	GA	GD	Pts
1	(Belgium) Anderlecht	2	2	0	0	5	1	+4	6
2	(Netherlands) PSV Eindhoven	2	1	1	0	8	1	+7	4
3	(England) Sunderland	2	1	1	0	5	3	+2	4
4	(England) Brighton & Hove Albion	1	1	0	0	2	1	+1	3
5	(England) Crystal Palace	2	1	0	1	3	5	−2	3
6	(England) Ipswich Town	3	1	0	2	2	9	−7	3
7	(Portugal) Porto	1	0	0	1	1	2	−1	0
8	(France) Paris Saint-Germain	3	0	0	3	4	8	−4	0

Updated to match(es) played on 20 November 2026. Source: Premier League

19 August 2026	Sunderland (England)	1–1	(Netherlands) PSV Eindhoven	Sunderland
12:00 BST (UTC+1)	Scott 27'	Report	Oteng-Mensah 21'	Stadium: Stadium of Light; Referee: Callum Jones

2 September 2026	Crystal Palace (England)	2–1	(France) Paris Saint-Germain	Sutton
19:00 BST (UTC+1)	Nascimento 6'; Williams 62'	Report	Bezeme 74'	Stadium: Gander Green Lane; Referee: Adam Merchant

16 September 2026	Brighton & Hove Albion (England)	2–1	(France) Paris Saint-Germain	Lancing
19:00 BST (UTC+1)	Ibrahim 40', 58'	Report	Bezeme 77'	Stadium: AMEX Elite Performance Centre; Referee: Adam Merchant

14 October 2026	Crystal Palace (England)	1–4	(Belgium) Anderlecht	Sutton
19:00 BST (UTC+1)	King 85'	Report	Sternal 2', 45+5'; Van De Ven 31'; De Ridder 90+5' (pen.)	Stadium: Gander Green Lane; Referee: Liam Trotter

20 October 2026	Ipswich Town (England)	0–1	(Belgium) Anderlecht	Ipswich
19:00 BST (UTC+1)		Report	N'Dao 23'	Stadium: Portman Road; Referee: Martyn Andrews

27 October 2026	Ipswich Town (England)	0–7	(Netherlands) PSV Eindhoven	Ipswich
12:00 GMT		Report	Santos 3', 8'; Cornecion 18', 64'; Bro Hansen 20', 45+3' (pen.); Manuhutu 43'	Stadium: Portman Road; Referee: Tolu Sangowawa

11 November 2026	Sunderland (England)	4–2	(France) Paris Saint-Germain	Sunderland
19:00 GMT	Whittaker 1', 22', 45+1'; Kindon 76'	Report	Bezeme 4', 90+5'	Stadium: Stadium of Light; Referee: Carl Baker

20 November 2026	Ipswich Town (England)	2–1	(Portugal) Porto	Ipswich
19:00 GMT	Turner 37'; Fletcher 70'	Report	Dinis 42'	Stadium: Portman Road; Referee: George Smith

2 December 2026	Brighton & Hove Albion (England)	v	(Netherlands) PSV Eindhoven
19:00 GMT

2 December 2026	Sunderland (England)	v	(Belgium) Anderlecht
19:00 GMT
Note: The match was originally going to be played on 30 October but was moved to 2 December 2026.

4 January 2027	Brighton & Hove Albion (England)	v	(Portugal) Porto
19:00 GMT

12 January 2027	Brighton & Hove Albion (England)	v	(Belgium) Anderlecht
19:00 GMT

12 January 2027	Crystal Palace (England)	v	(Netherlands) PSV Eindhoven
19:00 GMT

13 January 2027	Sunderland (England)	v	(Portugal) Porto
19:00 GMT

20 January 2027	Ipswich Town (England)	v	(France) Paris Saint-Germain	Ipswich
19:00 GMT				Stadium: Portman Road

10 February 2027	Crystal Palace (England)	v	(Portugal) Porto
19:00 GMT

== Top goalscorers ==
Players with more than one goal displayed
There have been 101 goals scored in 28 matches, for an average of 3.61 goals per match (as of 20 November 2026).

4 goals

- (France) Noa Bezeme (Paris Saint-Germain)

3 goals

- (Portugal) Miguel Almeida (Sporting CP)
- (England) Josh Blake (Aston Villa)
- (England) Jack Whittaker (Sunderland)

2 goals

- (France) Aymen Assab (Monaco)
- (Denmark) Mikkel Bro Hansen (PSV Eindhoven)
- (Portugal) Rafael Camacho (Sporting CP)
- (Curaçao) Shuryjano Cornecion (PSV Eindhoven)
- (Spain) Xuban Fernández (Real Sociedad)
- (Egypt) Younes Ibrahim (Brighton & Hove Albion)
- (Northern Ireland) Joel Kerr (West Ham United)
- (England) Jethro Medine (West Ham United)
- (Spain) Oihan Telletxea (Real Sociedad)
- (Cape Verde) Ayoni Santos (PSV Eindhoven)
- (France) Enzo Sternal (Anderlecht)
- (England) Spencer Sutton (Nottingham Forest)
