= Jakes Gorosabel =

Spanish footballer (born 2004)

Personal information
- Full name: Jakes Gorosabel Añorga
- Date of birth: 29 June 2004 (age 22)
- Place of birth: San Sebastián, Spain
- Position: Forward

Team information
- Current team: Girona B

Youth career
- Añorga
- 2020–2023: Antiguoko
- 2023: Real Sociedad

Senior career*
Years	Team	Apps	(Gls)
2023–2026	Real Sociedad C	55	(18)
2024–2026	Real Sociedad B	10	(0)
2025	→ Arenas Getxo (loan)	9	(1)
2026–	Girona B	0	(0)
- * Club domestic league appearances and goals as of 31 May 2026

Jakes Gorosabel Añorga (born 29 June 2004) is a Spanish footballer who plays as a forward for Girona FC B.

== Career ==
Born in San Sebastián, Gipuzkoa, Basque Country, Gorosabel agreed to join Real Sociedad's youth sides in November 2022, from Antiguoko KE. Promoted to the C-team ahead of the 2023–24 season, he made his senior debut on 3 September 2023, playing the last 18 minutes of a 1–0 Segunda Federación home win over CD Valle de Egüés.

Gorosabel scored his first senior goal on 5 November 2023, netting a last-minute winner for the C's in a 1–0 away success over Náxara CD. He then spent the 2024 pre-season with the reserves, and first appeared for the side on 29 September of that year, coming on as a late substitute for Sydney Osazuwa in a 2–1 Primera Federación away loss to Gimnàstic de Tarragona.

On 30 January 2025, after just two appearances for Sanse, Gorosabel was loaned to Arenas Club de Getxo in the fourth tier until June. Back to the Txuri-urdin after helping Arenas to achieve promotion, he was assigned back at the C-team, now in Tercera Federación.

Gorosabel made his professional debut with the B-team on 30 November 2025, replacing Jon Balda late into a 1–0 Segunda División home loss to CD Mirandés. The following 3 June, after a further six appearances for the B's, he left as his contract was due to expire.

== Personal life ==
Gorosabel's younger brother Gorka and their father Joseba were also footballers. A midfielder and a forward, respectively, they were also groomed at the Txuri-urdin.
