= Joan Oleaga =

Spanish footballer (born 2006)

Personal information
- Full name: Joan Oleaga Arregi
- Date of birth: 7 March 2006 (age 20)
- Place of birth: San Sebastián, Spain
- Height: 1.80 m (5 ft 11 in)
- Position: Midfielder

Team information
- Current team: Real Sociedad B
- Number: 12

Youth career
- Vasconia Donostia
- 2018–2024: Real Sociedad

Senior career*
Years	Team	Apps	(Gls)
2024–2026	Real Sociedad C	42	(1)
2026–	Real Sociedad B	7	(0)

International career
2025–	Spain U19	1	(0)
- * Club domestic league appearances and goals as of 9 June 2026

Joan Oleaga Arregi (born 7 March 2006) is a Spanish footballer who plays as a midfielder for Real Sociedad B.

== Club career ==
Born in San Sebastián, Gipuzkoa, Basque Country, Oleaga joined Real Sociedad's youth sides in June 2018, from CD Vasconia Donostia. He made his senior debut with the C-team on 8 September 2024, coming on as a late substitute in a 3–1 Segunda Federación home loss to SD Ejea.

Oleaga scored his first senior goal on 1 December 2024, netting the C's second in a 2–1 away win over Deportivo Aragón. He made his professional debut with the reserves on 10 January 2026, replacing Ibai Aguirre late into a 0–0 Segunda División home draw against Albacete Balompié.

== International career ==
On 18 February 2025, Oleaga was called up to the Spain national under-19 team for two friendlies against Norway. He made his debut for the side nine days later, starting in a 1–0 loss.
