= Basurco =

Basurco is a surname. Notable people with the surname include:

- Ibai Aguirre Basurco (born 2007), Spanish footballer
- Juan Manuel Basurco (1944–2014), Spanish footballer
