= Kiker =

Kiker is a surname. Notable people with the surname include:

- Douglas Kiker (1930–1991), American author and journalist
- Joe Kiker (1889–1959), Australian rules footballer
- Kasey Kiker (born 1987), American baseball player

== See also ==
- Iker
