= Unax Agote =

Spanish footballer (born 2003)

Personal information
- Full name: Unax Agote Aranburu
- Date of birth: 28 March 2003 (age 23)
- Place of birth: Zizurkil, Spain
- Height: 1.80 m (5 ft 11 in)
- Position: Left-back

Team information
- Current team: Real Sociedad B
- Number: 23

Youth career
- 2015–2021: Real Sociedad

Senior career*
| Years | Team | Apps | (Gls) |
| 2021–2023 | Real Sociedad C | 24 | (2) |
| 2021–2022 | → Pasaia (loan) | 34 | (2) |
| 2023– | Real Sociedad B | 68 | (0) |
- * Club domestic league appearances and goals as of 31 May 2026

Unax Agote Aranburu (born 28 March 2003) is a Spanish footballer who plays as a left-back for Real Sociedad B.

== Career ==
Born in Zizurkil, Gipuzkoa, Basque Country, Agote joined Real Sociedad's youth sides in 2015, aged 12. In 2021, after finishing his formation, he was loaned to Tercera Federación side Pasaia KE for one year.

Back to the Txuri-urdin in July 2022, Rodríguez was assigned to the C-team in Segunda Federación, and was promoted to the reserves in the following year. A backup to Ander Zoilo and later Jon Balda, he contributed with 18 appearances overall during the 2024–25 campaign as Sanse achieved promotion to Segunda División.

Agote made his professional debut on 17 August 2025, starting in a 1–0 home win over Real Zaragoza. Regularly used, he renewed his contract for a further year on 8 June 2026.
