= Unax Ayo =

Spanish footballer (born 2006)

Personal information
- Full name: Unax Ayo Larrañaga
- Date of birth: 22 October 2006 (age 20)
- Place of birth: Zumaia, Spain
- Position: Centre-back

Team information
- Current team: Real Sociedad B
- Number: 24

Youth career
- Zumaiako
- 2022–2025: Real Sociedad

Senior career*
Years	Team	Apps	(Gls)
2025–2026	Real Sociedad C	16	(0)
2026–	Real Sociedad B	15	(0)
- * Club domestic league appearances and goals as of 9 June 2026

Unax Ayo Larrañaga (born 22 October 2006) is a Spanish footballer who plays as a centre-back for Real Sociedad B.

== Career ==
Born in Zumaia, Gipuzkoa, Basque Country, Ayo joined Real Sociedad's youth sides in June 2022, from hometown side Zumaiako FT. He made his senior debut with the C-team on 7 September 2025, coming on as a half-time substitute in a 2–1 Tercera Federación away loss to SD Eibar C.

On 3 January 2026, after becoming a regular starter for the C's, Ayo made his professional debut with the reserves by replacing injured Iker Calderón in a 1–1 Segunda División away draw against Cultural y Deportiva Leonesa.
