= Iker =

- Pronunciation: [ˈiker]
- Gender: Male
- Language: Basque

Origin
- Meaning: Visitation

Iker is a Basque male given name. The corresponding female name is Ikerne. It was created by Spanish Basque writer Sabino Arana in his book Deun-Ixendegi Euzkotarra (Collection of Basque Saints' Names)—an effort to provide neologistic Basque versions of names instead of the traditional adaptations of Romance names. The name may refer to:

== People ==
=== First name ===
- Iker Aldai (born 2003), Spanish footballer
- Iker Almena (born 2004), Spanish footballer
- Iker Álvarez (born 2001), Andorran footballer
- Iker Amorrortu (born 1995), Spanish footballer
- Iker Bachiller (born 2002), Spanish footballer
- Iker Begoña (born 1976), Spanish footballer
- Iker Belausteguigoitía (1927-1991), Mexican sailor
- Iker Benito (born 2002), Spanish footballer
- Iker Bilbao (born 1996), Spanish footballer
- Iker Bravo (born 2005), Spanish footballer
- Iker Calderón (born 2006), Spanish footballer
- Iker Camaño (born 1979), Spanish cyclist
- Iker Carew (born 2003), Spanish footballer
- Iker Casas (born 1999), Mexican taekwondo practitioner
- Iker Casillas (born 1981), Spanish footballer
- Iker Córdoba (born 2005), Spanish footballer
- Íker Fernández (born 1977), Spanish snowboarder
- Iker Fimbres (born 2005), Mexican footballer
- Iker Flores (born 1976), Spanish cyclist
- Iker Gabaraín (born 1977), Spanish footballer
- Íker García (born 2006), Spanish footballer
- Iker Gil (born 2005), Spanish footballer
- Iker Goujón (born 1999), Spanish footballer
- Iker Guarrotxena (born 1992), Spanish footballer
- Iker Hernández (born 1994), Spanish footballer
- Iker Iturbe (born 1976), Spanish basketball player
- Iker Jiménez (born 1973), Spanish journalist
- Iker Kortajarena (born 2000), Spanish footballer
- Iker Lecuona (born 2000), Spanish motorcycle racer
- Iker Leonet (born 1983), Spanish cyclist
- Iker Losada (born 2001), Spanish footballer
- Iker Luque (born 2005), Spanish footballer
- Iker Martínez de Lizarduy (born 1977), Spanish sailor
- Iker Martínez (born 2004), Spanish footballer
- Iker Monreal (born 2005), Spanish footballer
- Iker Moreno (born 2003), Mexican footballer
- Iker Muniain (born 1992), Spanish footballer
- Iker Muñoz (born 2002), Spanish footballer
- Iker Pajares (born 1996), Spanish squash player
- Iker Pozo (born 2000), Spanish footballer
- Iker Punzano (born 2004), Spanish footballer
- Iker Recio (born 2001), Spanish footballer
- Iker Romero (born 1980), Spanish handball player
- Iker Ropero (born 2006), Spanish footballer
- Iker Seguín (born 1989), Spanish footballer
- Iker Undabarrena (born 1995), Spanish footballer
- Iker Unzueta (born 1998), Spanish footballer
- Iker Varela (born 2003), Spanish footballer
- Iker Zubizarreta (born 1962), Venezuelan footballer

=== Surname ===
- Jack Iker (1949–2024), American bishop

== See also ==
- Idudju-iker (fl. c. 2050 BC), Egyptian high official
