= Ekain Orobengoa =

Spanish footballer (born 2004)

Personal information
- Full name: Ekain Orobengoa Arbelaiz
- Date of birth: 17 June 2004 (age 22)
- Place of birth: Oiartzun, Spain
- Height: 1.84 m (6 ft 0 in)
- Position: Forward

Team information
- Current team: Real Sociedad B
- Number: 9

Youth career
- Kostkas
- 2016–2022: Real Sociedad

Senior career*
Years	Team	Apps	(Gls)
2022–2024	Real Sociedad C	49	(8)
2023–	Real Sociedad B	61	(4)
- * Club domestic league appearances and goals as of 4 October 2025

Ekain Orobengoa Arbelaiz (born 17 June 2004) is a Spanish footballer who plays as a forward for Real Sociedad B.

== Career ==
Born in Oiartzun, Gipuzkoa, Basque Country, Orobengoa played for CD Kostkas and had a trial at Real Madrid in March 2016. He was expected to join the latter club in the summer, but moved to Real Sociedad instead.

After progressing through the youth sides, Orobengoa made his senior debut with the C-team on 6 February 2022, coming on as a second-half substitute in a 0–0 Segunda División RFEF home draw against CA Osasuna B. He scored his first senior goal on 27 March, netting the opener in a 1–1 away draw against Náxara CD.

Orobengoa started featuring with the reserves during the 2023–24 season, and contributed with three goals in 36 appearances overall during the 2024–25 campaign as the club achieved promotion to Segunda División. He made his professional debut on 17 August 2025, starting in a 1–0 home win over Real Zaragoza.

In October 2025, Orobengoa suffered a knee injury which sidelined him for the remainder of the season.
