= Gorka Gorosabel =

Spanish footballer (born 2002)

Personal information
- Full name: Gorka Gorosabel Añorga
- Date of birth: 13 May 2006 (age 20)
- Place of birth: San Sebastián, Spain
- Height: 1.78 m (5 ft 10 in)
- Position: Midfielder

Team information
- Current team: Real Sociedad B
- Number: 16

Youth career
- Añorga
- Real Sociedad

Senior career*
Years	Team	Apps	(Gls)
2023–2025	Real Sociedad C	31	(4)
2025–	Real Sociedad B	34	(2)
- * Club domestic league appearances and goals as of 9 June 2026

Gorka Gorosabel Añorga (born 13 May 2006) is a Spanish footballer who plays as a midfielder for Real Sociedad B.

== Career ==
Born in San Sebastián, Gipuzkoa, Basque Country, Gorosabel joined Real Sociedad's youth sides from Añorga KKE. He made his senior debut with the C-team on 14 October 2023, coming on as a late substitute in a 1–0 Segunda Federación home loss to Barakaldo CF.

Gorosabel scored his first senior goal on 1 March 2025, netting the C's equalizer in a 2–1 away win over Arenas Club de Getxo. He first appeared with the reserves on 19 April, replacing Alex Marchal in a 1–0 Primera Federación loss at CD Lugo.

A starter in the first leg of the promotion play-off finals against Gimnàstic de Tarragona, Gorosabel scored the opener in the 3–1 win at the Nou Estadi Costa Daurada; it was only his fourth appearances with the B's during the season, as the club achieved promotion to Segunda División.

Gorosabel made his professional debut on 17 August 2025, starting in a 1–0 home win over Real Zaragoza.

== Personal life ==
Gorosabel's older brother Jakes and their father Joseba were also footballers. Both forwards, they were also groomed at the Txuri-urdin.
