= Pablo Marín (footballer, born 2003) =

Spanish footballer (born 2003)

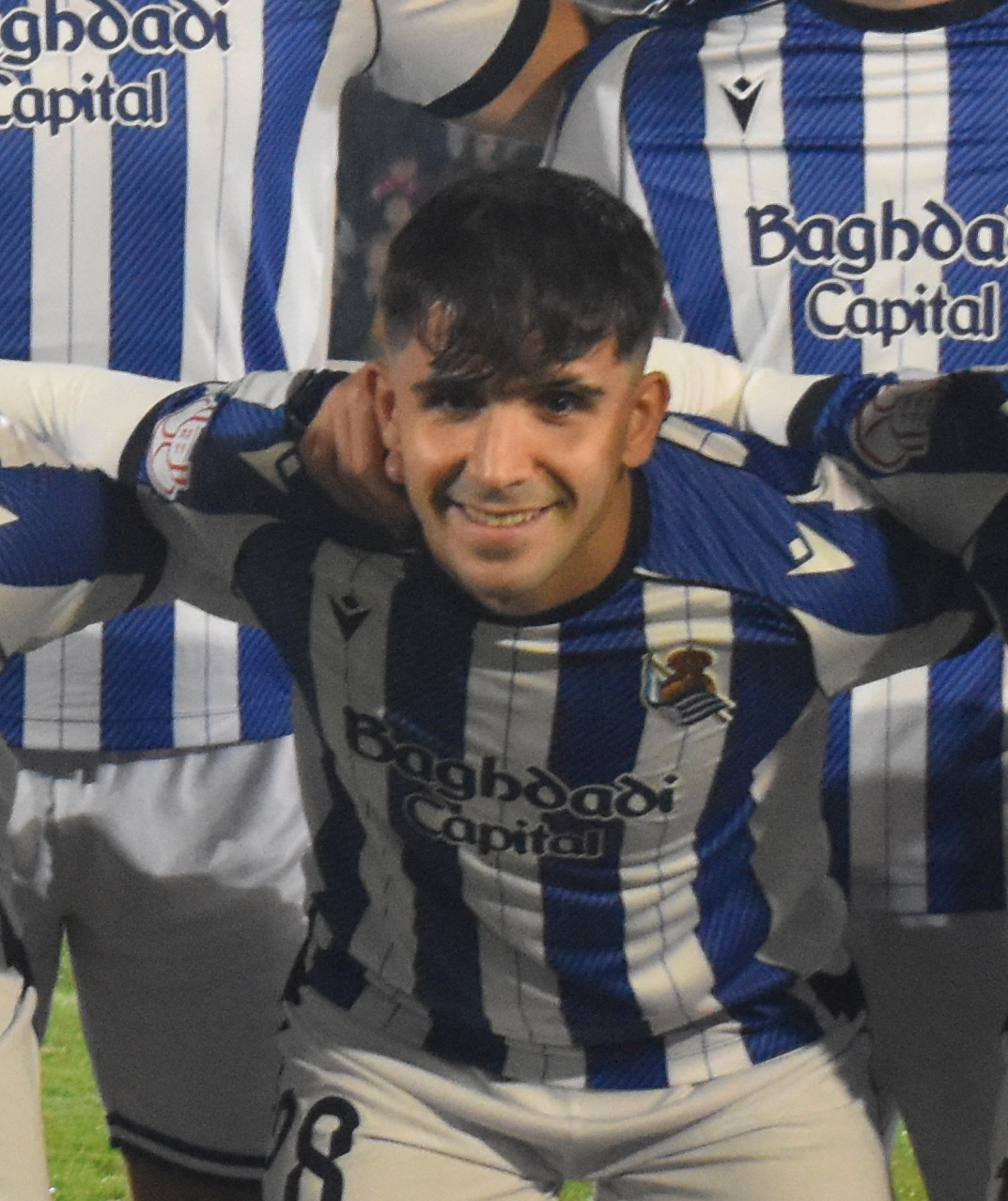
- Marín as a Real Sociedad player in 2025

Personal information
- Full name: Pablo Marín Tejada
- Date of birth: 3 July 2003 (age 23)
- Place of birth: Logroño, Spain
- Height: 1.78 m (5 ft 10 in)
- Position: Midfielder

Team information
- Current team: Real Sociedad
- Number: 15

Youth career
- Academia Tiki-Taka
- EDF Logroño
- 2016–2021: Real Sociedad

Senior career*
Years	Team	Apps	(Gls)
2020–2022	Real Sociedad C	22	(7)
2022–2024	Real Sociedad B	56	(7)
2022–	Real Sociedad	67	(1)

International career^{‡}
2021	Spain U19	2	(0)
2025–	Spain U21	2	(0)
- * Club domestic league appearances and goals as of 11 October 2026 ‡ National team caps and goals as of 14:21, 20 June 2025 (UTC)

Pablo Marín Tejada (born 3 July 2003) is a Spanish professional footballer who plays as a midfielder for Real Sociedad.

== Club career ==
Born in Logroño, La Rioja, Marín joined Real Sociedad's youth setup in 2016, after representing EDF Logroño and Academia Tiki-Taka. He made his senior debut with the C-team on 1 November 2020, starting in a 1–3 Tercera División home loss against Tolosa CF.

Definitely promoted to the C-team ahead of the 2021–22 campaign, now in the Segunda División RFEF, Marín scored his first senior goal on 9 October 2021, netting his side's second in a 3–1 home success over UD Mutilvera. On 19 December, he scored a brace for the C's in a 3–2 win at Peña Sport FC.

Marín made his professional debut with the reserves on 8 January 2022, coming on as a late substitute for Luca Sangalli in a 1–1 away draw against CD Leganés in the Segunda División. His first team – and La Liga – debut occurred on 22 October, as he replaced Takefusa Kubo in a 1–0 away loss against Real Valladolid.

== International career ==
In October 2021, Marín made his debut for the Spain under-19 national team.

== Personal life ==
Marín's father Fernando was also a footballer and a midfielder. A CD Logroñés youth graduate, he featured in 21 La Liga matches and in over 200 appearances for the club overall.

== Career statistics ==
=== Club ===
As of match played 22 October 2026

Appearances and goals by club, season and competition
Club	Season	League			Cup		Europe		Other		Total	
Club	Season	Division	Apps	Goals	Apps	Goals	Apps	Goals	Apps	Goals	Apps	Goals
Real Sociedad C	2020–21	Tercera Federación	6	0	—		—		—		6	0
Real Sociedad C	2021–22	Segunda Federación	16	7	—		—		—		16	7
Real Sociedad C	Total		22	7	—		—		—		22	7
Real Sociedad B	2021–22	Segunda División	1	0	—		—		—		1	0
Real Sociedad B	2022–23	Primera Federación	28	4	—		—		—		28	4
Real Sociedad B	2023–24	Primera Federación	27	3	—		—		—		27	3
Real Sociedad B	Total		56	7	—		—		—		56	7
Real Sociedad	2022–23	La Liga	10	0	5	0	2 (Note: Appearances in UEFA Champions League)	0	—		17	0
Real Sociedad	2023–24	La Liga	0	0	0	0	0	0	—		0	0
Real Sociedad	2024–25	La Liga	23	1	6	0	9 (Note: Appearances in UEFA Europa League)	1	—		38	2
Real Sociedad	2025–26	La Liga	33	0	6	1	—		—		39	1
Real Sociedad	2026–27	La Liga	1	0	0	0	2	0	—		3	0
Real Sociedad	Total		67	1	17	1	13	1	0	0	97	3
Career total			149	15	17	1	13	1	0	0	179	17

== Honours ==
Real Sociedad

- Copa del Rey: 2025–26
