= Fernando Marín =

Fernando Marín may refer to:

- Fernando Marín (abbot) (1480–1527), abbot of Nájera
- Fernando Marín (businessman) (born 1955), Colombian businessman, engineer and ambassador
- Fernando Marín (footballer) (born 1971), Spanish footballer
