= Luken Beitia =

Spanish footballer (born 2004)

Personal information
- Full name: Luken Beitia Aguirregomezcorta
- Date of birth: 30 June 2004 (age 22)
- Place of birth: Elgoibar, Spain
- Height: 1.91 m (6 ft 3 in)
- Position: Centre-back

Team information
- Current team: Real Sociedad B
- Number: 4

Youth career
- 2016–2022: Real Sociedad

Senior career*
Years	Team	Apps	(Gls)
2021–2024	Real Sociedad C	42	(0)
2023–	Real Sociedad B	75	(1)
2024–	Real Sociedad	6	(0)
- * Club domestic league appearances and goals as of 20 September 2026

Luken Beitia Aguirregomezcorta (born 30 June 2004) is a Spanish footballer who plays as a centre-back for Real Sociedad B.

== Career ==
Born in Elgoibar, Gipuzkoa, Basque Country, Beitia joined Real Sociedad's youth sides in 2016, aged 12. He made his senior debut with the C-team on 5 December 2021, coming on as a second-half substitute in a 0–0 Segunda División RFEF away draw against Racing Rioja CF.

Beitia first appeared with the reserves on 8 October 2023, playing 32 minutes in a 1–0 Primera Federación home win over FC Barcelona Atlètic. The following 13 April, he renewed his contract until 2027.

On 21 November 2024, after establishing himself as a regular starter with the B's, Beitia made his debut with the main squad by starting in a 5–0 away routing of FC Jove Español San Vicente, for the season's Copa del Rey. He made his La Liga debut the following 23 February, replacing fellow youth graduate Aritz Elustondo late into a 3–0 home win over CD Leganés.

== Career statistics ==
As of match played 20 September 2026

Appearances and goals by club, season and competition
Club	Season	League			Cup		Europe		Other		Total	
Club	Season	Division	Apps	Goals	Apps	Goals	Apps	Goals	Apps	Goals	Apps	Goals
Real Sociedad C	2021–22	Segunda Federación	9	0	—		—		—		9	0
Real Sociedad C	2022–23	Segunda Federación	30	0	—		—		—		30	0
Real Sociedad C	2023–24	Segunda Federación	3	0	—		—		—		3	0
Real Sociedad C	Total		42	0	—		—		—		42	0
Real Sociedad B	2023–24	Primera Federación	19	0	—		—		—		19	0
Real Sociedad B	2024–25	Primera Federación	32	1	—		—		4 (Note: Appearances in 2025 Primera Federación play-offs)	0	36	1
Real Sociedad B	2025–26	Segunda División	23	0	—		—		—		23	0
Real Sociedad B	2026–27	Segunda División	1	0	—		—		—		1	0
Real Sociedad B	Total		75	1	—		—		4	0	79	1
Real Sociedad	2024–25	La Liga	1	0	1	0	—		—		2	0
Real Sociedad	2025–26	La Liga	2	0	1	0	—		—		3	0
Real Sociedad	2026–27	La Liga	3	0	0	0	1 (Note: Appearances in UEFA Europa League)	0	0	0	4	0
Real Sociedad	Total		6	0	2	0	1	0	0	0	9	0
Career total			123	1	2	0	1	0	4	0	130	1

== Honours ==
Real Sociedad

- Copa del Rey: 2025–26
