= Alex Lebarbier =

French footballer (born 2004)

Personal information
- Full name: Alex Douma Johan Lebarbier
- Date of birth: 23 August 2004 (age 22)
- Place of birth: Paris, France
- Height: 1.84 m (6 ft 0 in)
- Position: Midfielder

Team information
- Current team: Real Sociedad B
- Number: 6

Youth career
- AS Paris
- 2018–2020: Red Star
- 2020–2022: Real Sociedad

Senior career*
Years	Team	Apps	(Gls)
2022–2023	Real Sociedad C	28	(0)
2022–	Real Sociedad B	57	(2)
- * Club domestic league appearances and goals as of 9 June 2026

Alex Douma Johan Lebarbier (born 23 August 2004) is a French footballer who plays as a midfielder for Spanish club Real Sociedad B.

== Career ==
Born in Paris to Cameroonian parents, Lebarbier played for AS Paris and Red Star FC as a youth, before joining Real Sociedad's youth sides in 2020. He made his senior debut with the C-team on 13 March 2022, starting in a 1–0 Segunda División RFEF away win over CD Tropezón.

On 15 July 2022, Lebarbier signed his first professional contract with the Txuri-urdin, agreeing to a three-year deal. After establishing himself as a starter for the C's, he first appeared with the reserves on 2 October, coming on as a second-half substitute for goalscorer Pablo Marín in a 2–0 Primera Federación home win over FC Barcelona Atlètic.

On 3 March 2025, Lebarbier further extended his link with Real Sociedad until 2027. Albeit not a regular starter, he contributed with 33 appearances overall for Sanse during the 2024–25 season, as the club achieved promotion to Segunda División.

Lebarbier made his professional debut on 17 August 2025, replacing Mikel Rodríguez in a 1–0 home win over Real Zaragoza.
