= Andrews Adjabeng =

Ghanaian footballer (born 2006)

Personal information
- Full name: Andrews Adjabeng
- Date of birth: 4 March 2006 (age 20)
- Place of birth: Ghana
- Height: 1.75 m (5 ft 9 in)
- Position: Winger

Team information
- Current team: Real Sociedad B
- Number: 34

Youth career
- African Talent Football Academy
- 2024–2025: Real Sociedad

Senior career*
Years	Team	Apps	(Gls)
2024–	Real Sociedad C	25	(4)
2026–	Real Sociedad B	3	(0)

International career
2024–	Ghana U20	7	(0)
- * Club domestic league appearances and goals as of 9 June 2026

Andrews Adjabeng (born 4 March 2006) is a Ghanaian footballer who plays as a winger for Spanish club Real Sociedad B.

== Club career ==
A member of the African Talent Football Academy, Adjabeng joined the youth categories of Real Sociedad in 2024. In February 2025, he was promoted to the C-team in Segunda Federación, and made his senior debut on 23 February, starting in a 1–0 home loss to SD Logroñés but being substituted with just 37 minutes.

Adjabeng first appeared as a professional with the reserves on 24 January 2026, coming on as a second-half substitute for Arkaitz Mariezkurrena in a 2–0 Segunda División away loss to CD Leganés.

== International career ==
A member of the Ghana national under-20 team since 2024, Adjabeng was included in the 24-man squad for the 2025 U-20 Africa Cup of Nations in May of that year. He played in Ghana's four matches of the tournament, as they were knocked out in the quarter-finals.
