= Peru Larrañaga =

Spanish footballer (born 2008)

Personal information
- Full name: Peru Larrañaga Vázquez
- Date of birth: 8 December 2008 (age 17)
- Place of birth: Mondragón, Spain
- Position: Centre-back

Team information
- Current team: Real Sociedad C
- Number: 30

Youth career
- Mondragón
- 2023–2026: Real Sociedad

Senior career*
Years	Team	Apps	(Gls)
2026–	Real Sociedad C	7	(1)
2026–	Real Sociedad B	1	(0)
- * Club domestic league appearances and goals as of 12 September 2026

Peru Larrañaga Vázquez (born 8 December 2008) is a Spanish footballer who plays as a centre-back for Real Sociedad C.

== Career ==
Born in Mondragón, Gipuzkoa, Basque Country, Larrañaga joined Real Sociedad's youth sides in 2023, from Mondragón CF. He made his senior debut with the C-team on 24 January 2026, playing the last 29 minutes of a 2–1 Tercera Federación away loss to SD Leioa.

Larrañaga made his professional debut with the reserves on 12 September 2026, coming on as a second-half substitute for Iker Ropero in a 3–1 Segunda División away win over FC Andorra.
