= Jon Eceizabarrena =

Spanish footballer (born 2005)

Personal information
- Full name: Jon Eceizabarrena Rezola
- Date of birth: 23 March 2005 (age 21)
- Place of birth: San Sebastián, Spain
- Height: 1.79 m (5 ft 10 in)
- Position: Midfielder

Team information
- Current team: Real Sociedad B
- Number: 21

Youth career
- Real Sociedad

Senior career*
Years	Team	Apps	(Gls)
2023–2025	Real Sociedad C	51	(4)
2024–	Real Sociedad B	26	(0)
- * Club domestic league appearances and goals as of 9 June 2026

Jon Eceizabarrena Rezola (born 23 March 2005) is a Spanish footballer who plays as a midfielder for Real Sociedad B.

== Career ==
Born in San Sebastián, Gipuzkoa, Basque Country, Eceizabarrena was a youth graduate of Real Sociedad. He made his senior debut with the C-team on 3 September 2023, coming on as a second-half substitute in a 1–0 Segunda Federación home win over CD Valle de Egüés.

After becoming a regular starter with the C's, Eceizabarrena first appeared with the reserves on 6 December 2024, replacing Mikel Goti late into a 2–0 Primera Federación home win over SD Amorebieta. He only featured in one further match for Sanse during the season, as the club achieved promotion to Segunda División.

After starting the 2025 pre-season with the B-team, Eceizabarrena made his professional debut on 17 August of that year, replacing goalscorer Job Ochieng late into a 1–0 Segunda División home win over Real Zaragoza.
