= Juan Cuyami =

Equatoguinean footballer (born 1972)

Jon Cuyami
Personal information
- Full name: Juan Remigio Cuyami Vaz
- Date of birth: 17 December 1972 (age 53)
- Place of birth: San Sebastián, Spain
- Height: 1.72 m (5 ft 8 in)
- Position: Forward

Youth career
- Añorga KKE
- 1989–1991: Real Sociedad

Senior career*
Years	Team	Apps	(Gls)
1991–1996	Real Sociedad B	127	(23)
1994–1995	Real Sociedad	10	(0)
1996	Figueres	3	(1)
1996–1997	Poli Almería	27	(5)
1997–1999	Recreativo	41	(6)
1999–2000	Ceuta	17	(1)
2000–2002	Burgos	66	(12)
2002–2003	Sabadell	29	(2)
2003–2004	Palencia	32	(7)
2004–2005	Lemona	31	(5)
2005–2007	Zarautz		
Total		383	(62)

International career
2003	Equatorial Guinea	2	(0)
- * Club domestic league appearances and goals

Juan 'Jon' Remigio Cuyami Vaz (born 17 December 1972) is a former footballer who played as a forward. Born and raised in Spain to Equatorial Guinean Fang parents, he capped for the Equatorial Guinea national team.

== Club career ==
Born in San Sebastián, Gipuzkoa, Spain, Cuyami managed ten scoreless La Liga appearances for Real Sociedad after growing in its youth system. For the next 12 years, however, his career was spent in Segunda División B or lower (with the exception of Recreativo de Huelva and Burgos CF in Segunda División, clubs which he helped promote).

In 2004, Cuyami returned to the Basque Country for his final three seasons, with SD Lemona and Zarautz KE, the latter in the regional championships. Shortly after, he rejoined to Real Sociedad as part of its indoor soccer team.

== International career ==
As Javier Balboa, Rodolfo Bodipo or Benjamín Zarandona, Cuyami was the son of Equatoguinean immigrants in Spain, and opted to represent his parents' nation internationally. His debut came on 11 October 2003 in a 1–0 win against Togo for the 2006 FIFA World Cup qualifiers (eventual 1–2 aggregate loss), in Bata.

Cuyami won a total of two caps, the second coming also that year in a friendly with São Tomé and Príncipe.
