= Tomy Carbonell =

Spanish footballer (born 2005)

Personal information
- Full name: Tomás Carbonell del Río
- Date of birth: 23 February 2005 (age 21)
- Place of birth: Barcelona, Spain
- Height: 1.83 m (6 ft 0 in)
- Position: Midfielder

Team information
- Current team: Real Sociedad B
- Number: 14

Youth career
- Cabrera
- 2013–2014: Espanyol
- 2014–2018: Barcelona
- 2018–2020: Cornellà
- 2020–2024: Badalona

Senior career*
Years	Team	Apps	(Gls)
2024	Badalona	3	(0)
2024	Real Sociedad C	2	(0)
2024–	Real Sociedad B	69	(1)
- * Club domestic league appearances and goals as of 9 June 2026

Tomás "Tomy" Carbonell del Río (born 23 February 2005) is a Spanish footballer who plays as a midfielder for Real Sociedad B.

== Career ==
Born in Barcelona, Catalonia, Carbonell began his career with Cabrera and played for Espanyol, before joining Barcelona's La Masia in 2014, aged nine. After captaining the 2005 generation, he left the latter in 2018, and subsequently represented Cornellà and Badalona as a youth.

After impressing in the Juvenil squad of Badalona, Carbonell made his first team debut on 14 January 2024, coming on as a half-time substitute for Willy Chatiliez in a 2–1 Tercera Federación home win over Grama. After a further two appearances, he joined Real Sociedad on 3 July, being initially assigned to the C-team in the Segunda Federación.

Albeit a member of the C's, Carbonell would establish himself as a starter with the reserves in the Primera Federación, contributing with 38 appearances overall during the season as the side achieved promotion to the Segunda División.

== Personal life ==
Carbonell's father, also named Tomás, was a professional tennis player and later became a sports commentator.
