= Iker Calderón =

Spanish footballer (born 2006)

Personal information
- Full name: Iker Calderón Balda
- Date of birth: 27 March 2006 (age 20)
- Place of birth: San Sebastián, Spain
- Height: 1.94 m (6 ft 4 in)
- Position: Centre-back

Team information
- Current team: Real Sociedad B
- Number: 15

Youth career
- Vasconia Donostia
- 2022–2023: Antiguoko
- 2023–2025: Real Sociedad

Senior career*
Years	Team	Apps	(Gls)
2025–2026	Real Sociedad C	16	(0)
2025–	Real Sociedad B	7	(0)
- * Club domestic league appearances and goals as of 9 June 2026

Iker Calderón Balda (born 27 March 2006) is a Spanish footballer who plays as a centre-back for Real Sociedad B.

== Career ==
Born in San Sebastián, Gipuzkoa, Basque Country, Calderón joined Real Sociedad's youth sides in June 2023, after representing Antiguoko KE and CD Vasconia Donostia. He made his senior debut with the C-team on 4 May 2025, starting in a 3–0 Segunda Federación away loss to Gernika Club, as his side was already relegated.

On 30 November 2025, after becoming a regular starter for the C's (now in Tercera Federación), Calderón made his professional debut with the reserves by coming on as a second-half substitute for Dani Díaz in a 1–0 Segunda División home loss to CD Mirandés.
