= Job Ochieng =

Kenyan footballer (born 2003)

Personal information
- Full name: Job Nguono Ochieng
- Date of birth: 17 January 2003 (age 23)
- Place of birth: Nairobi, Kenya
- Height: 1.85 m (6 ft 1 in)
- Position: Forward

Team information
- Current team: Real Sociedad
- Number: 12

Youth career
- 2020–2022: Maspalomas

Senior career*
| Years | Team | Apps | (Gls) |
| 2020–2022 | Maspalomas | 8 | (1) |
| 2022–2023 | Real Sociedad C | 8 | (0) |
| 2023–2026 | Real Sociedad B | 65 | (10) |
| 2026– | Real Sociedad | 9 | (1) |

International career^{‡}
| 2025– | Kenya | 7 | (0) |
- * Club domestic league appearances and goals as of 25 October 2026 ‡ National team caps and goals as of 1 October 2026

Job Nguono Ochieng (born 17 January 2003) is a Kenyan footballer who plays as a forward for Real Sociedad and the Kenya national team.

== Early life ==
Born in Nairobi, Ochieng began his career with local sides PCEA Lang’ata School and Express Soccer Academy. In 2020, aged 17, with the aid of family members and neighbors, he traveled to the Canary Islands to join a local football school in exchange for a monthly fee of € 1,200. The arrangement agency subsequently collapsed, but Ochieng managed to impress during a trial at Maspalomas.

After impressing at Maspalomas, Ochieng also spent a period on trial at Las Palmas.

== Club career ==
In 2022, Ochieng went on a trial at Real Sociedad, and signed for the club's C-team shortly after. However, he struggled with injuries which prevented him from playing until February 2023, when he debuted for the C's by starting in a 1–0 Segunda Federación home win over Alavés B.

Promoted to the reserves for the 2023–24 season, Ochieng was mainly a backup option as the side achieved promotion to Segunda División in 2025. He made his professional debut on 17 August of that year, starting and scoring the winner in a 1–0 home win over Zaragoza.

Ochieng made his first team – and La Liga – debut on 7 February 2026, coming on as a second-half substitute for Gonçalo Guedes in a 3–1 home win over Elche; he became the third Kenyan to feature in the division, behind McDonald Mariga and Michael Olunga. Thirteen days later, he renewed his contract with the Txuri-urdin until 2028.

In August 2026, Ochieng was definitely promoted to the first team of Real Sociedad, being assigned the number 12 jersey.

== International career ==
Ochieng made his debut with the Kenya national team in August 2025.

== Style of play ==
Ochieng can play as a forward or as a winger. Spanish newspaper La Provincia described him as a "fast forward, with goal-scoring skills, good ball handling with both legs and good dribbling. He is physically powerful, with a great capacity for defensive sacrifice".

== Career statistics ==
=== Club ===
As of match played 25 October 2026

Appearances and goals by club, season and competition
| Club | Season | League | | | Cup | | Europe | | Other | | Total | |
| Club | Season | Division | Apps | Goals | Apps | Goals | Apps | Goals | Apps | Goals | Apps | Goals |
|---|---|---|---|---|---|---|---|---|---|---|---|---|
| Maspalomas | 2020–21 | Interinsular Preferente | 4 | 0 | — | | — | | — | | 4 | 0 |
| Maspalomas | 2021–22 | Interinsular Preferente | 4 | 1 | — | | — | | — | | 4 | 1 |
| Maspalomas | Total | | 8 | 1 | — | | — | | — | | 8 | 1 |
| Real Sociedad C | 2022–23 | Segunda Federación | 8 | 0 | — | | — | | — | | 8 | 0 |
| Real Sociedad B | 2023–24 | Primera Federación | 19 | 0 | — | | — | | — | | 19 | 0 |
| Real Sociedad B | 2024–25 | Primera Federación | 21 | 1 | — | | — | | 2 (Note: Appearances in 2025 Primera Federación play-offs) | 0 | 23 | 1 |
| Real Sociedad B | 2025–26 | Segunda División | 25 | 9 | — | | — | | — | | 25 | 9 |
| Real Sociedad B | Total | | 65 | 10 | — | | — | | 2 | 0 | 67 | 10 |
| Real Sociedad | 2025–26 | La Liga | 2 | 0 | 1 | 0 | — | | — | | 3 | 0 |
| Real Sociedad | 2026–27 | La Liga | 7 | 1 | 0 | 0 | 1 (Note: Appearances in UEFA Europa League) | 0 | 0 | 0 | 8 | 1 |
| Real Sociedad | Total | | 9 | 1 | 1 | 0 | 1 | 0 | 0 | 0 | 11 | 1 |
| Career total | | | 90 | 12 | 1 | 0 | 1 | 0 | 2 | 0 | 94 | 12 |

=== International ===
As of match played 1 October 2026

Appearances and goals by national team and year
| National team | Year | Apps | Goals |
|---|---|---|---|
| Kenya | 2025 | 4 | 0 |
| Kenya | 2026 | 3 | 0 |
| Total | | 7 | 0 |
