= Ander Zoilo =

Spanish footballer (born 2000)

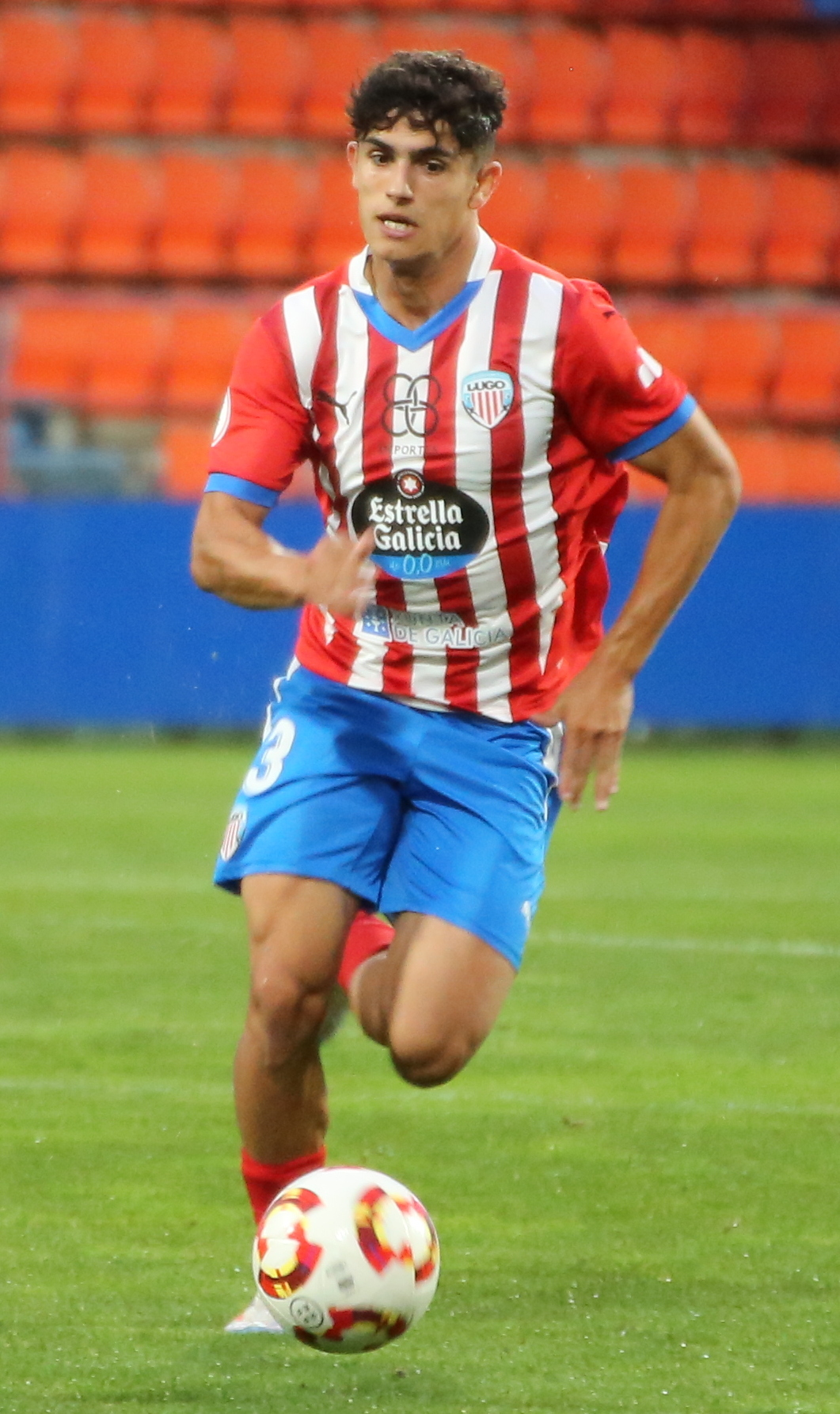
- Zoilo with Lugo in 2024

Personal information
- Full name: Ander Zoilo Cerdeira
- Date of birth: 14 February 2000 (age 26)
- Place of birth: Beasain, Spain
- Height: 1.77 m (5 ft 10 in)
- Position: Left-back

Team information
- Current team: Barakaldo

Youth career
- 2012–2019: Real Sociedad

Senior career*
Years	Team	Apps	(Gls)
2019–2021	Real Sociedad C	48	(1)
2021–2024	Real Sociedad B	42	(0)
2022	→ Calahorra (loan)	11	(0)
2024–2025	Lugo	36	(2)
2025–2026	Tenerife	10	(0)
2026	→ Gimnàstic (loan)	12	(0)
2026–	Barakaldo	0	(0)
- * Club domestic league appearances and goals as of 10 June 2026

Ander Zoilo Cerdeira (born 14 February 2000) is a Spanish professional footballer who plays as a left-back for Barakaldo CF.

== Career ==
Zoilo was born in Beasain, Gipuzkoa, Basque Country, and joined Real Sociedad's youth setup in 2012 at the age of 12. He made his senior debut with the C-team on 25 August 2019, coming on as a second-half substitute in a 1–1 Tercera División home draw against Club Portugalete.

Zoilo scored his first senior goal on 14 February 2021, netting the C's fifth in a 5–0 home routing of Urgatzi KK, and ended the campaign with 25 appearances as the side achieved promotion to Segunda División RFEF. On 1 July, he renewed his contract until 2023, and spent the entire pre-season with the reserves.

Zoilo made his professional debut with the B-team on 18 September 2021, replacing fellow debutant Jon Magunazelaia in a 1–1 away draw against Real Zaragoza in the Segunda División championship. The following 4 January, he moved on loan to Primera División RFEF side CD Calahorra for the remainder of the season.

Back to Sanse in July 2022, Zoilo featured regularly for the side (now also in the third division) before agreeing to a one-year deal with CD Lugo in the same category on 4 July 2024. On 7 July 2025, he signed a two-year contract with CD Tenerife also in division three.

On 20 January 2026, Zoilo was loaned to fellow third tier side Gimnàstic de Tarragona until June. Upon returning, he terminated his link with Tete on 28 July, and signed for Barakaldo CF just hours later.
