= Mamadou Sarr =

Senegal international footballer (born 2005)

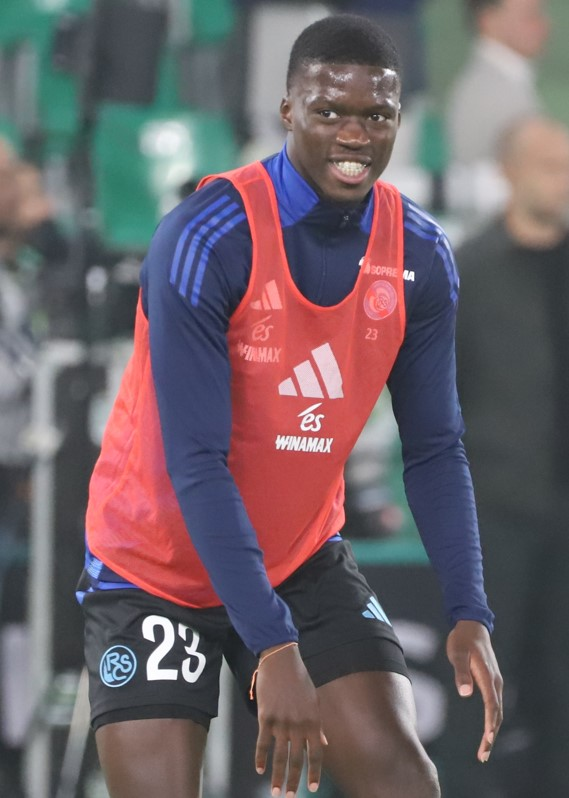
- Sarr with Strasbourg in 2024

Personal information
- Full name: Mamadou Sarr
- Date of birth: 29 August 2005 (age 21)
- Place of birth: Martigues, Bouches-du-Rhône, France
- Height: 1.94 m (6 ft 4 in)
- Position: Centre-back

Team information
- Current team: Real Sociedad (on loan from Chelsea)
- Number: 19

Youth career
- 2011–2012: ESSLB
- 2012–2018: Lens
- 2018–2022: Lyon

Senior career*
Years	Team	Apps	(Gls)
2022–2023	Lyon B	22	(1)
2023–2024	Lyon	2	(0)
2023–2024	→ RWDM Brussels (loan)	10	(0)
2024–2025	Strasbourg	27	(0)
2025–	Chelsea	3	(0)
2025–2026	→ Strasbourg (loan)	15	(0)
2026–	→ Real Sociedad (loan)	7	(0)

International career^{‡}
2021–2022	France U17	14	(0)
2022–2023	France U18	10	(1)
2023–2024	France U19	6	(0)
2024	France U20	2	(0)
2025–	Senegal	9	(0)
Medal record
Men's football
Representing France
UEFA European Under-19 Championship
Runner-up	2024
UEFA European Under-17 Championship
Winner	2022
Representing Senegal
Africa Cup of Nations
Runner-up	2025
- * Club domestic league appearances and goals as of 22:32, 22 November 2026 (UTC) ‡ National team caps and goals as of 23:11, 4 October 2026 (UTC)

Mamadou Sarr (born 29 August 2005) is a professional footballer who plays as a centre-back for La Liga club Real Sociedad, on loan from Premier League club Chelsea. Born in France, he plays for the Senegal national team.

== Early life ==
Mamadou Sarr was born on 29 August 2005, and is the son of former Senegalese international Pape Sarr. Mamadou was born in Martigues, Bouches-du-Rhône, while his father was playing for Istres. Sarr spent most of his childhood living in Nord-Pas-de-Calais, following his father who spent a large part of his career at Lens.

== Early career ==
Sarr began his football career at Étoile Sportive de Saint-Laurent-Blangy, before joining Lens, where his father plays. He then moved to Lyon in 2018.

During the 2021–22 season, at only 16 years old, he established himself as a starter with Les Gones under-19 team. He thus played an important role in Lyon's triumph in the Coupe Gambardella alongside players like Hugo Vogel and Mohamed El Arouch. He scored in the quarter-final against Strasbourg, then in the semi-final against Troyes.

== Club career ==
=== Lyon ===
On 27 May 2023, Sarr made his professional debut in Lyon's 3–0 Ligue 1 victory against Reims as a substitute, replacing Maxence Caqueret in the 83rd minute.

On 18 January 2024, Sarr moved on loan to RWDM Brussels in Belgium until the end of the 2023–24 season, where he played 10 games, but could not prevent them from being relegated.

=== Strasbourg ===
On 22 August 2024, Sarr joined Ligue 1 fellow Strasbourg for a transfer fee of €10M and signed a five-year contract with the team.

=== Chelsea ===
On 9 June 2025, Sarr moved to Chelsea on an eight-year contract. On 25 June 2025, he made his Chelsea debut as a late substitute in the 3–0 group stage win over Espérance in the Club World Cup, a competition that Chelsea would go on to eventually win. However, on 1 August 2025, Chelsea announced that Sarr would be loaned out back to Strasbourg on a season-long loan.

On 2 February 2026, Sarr was recalled by Chelsea. On 13 February 2026, he made his first ever start for Chelsea in the 4–0 away win against Hull City in the fourth round of the FA Cup.

On 28 August 2026, Sarr moved to La Liga side Real Sociedad on a one-year loan deal.

== International career ==
Eligible to play with Senegal, Sarr chose France for his first selections for the youth team, even recovering the captain's armband on several occasions with the under-17s. In April 2022, he was selected with the France team for the 2022 UEFA European Under-17 Championship organised in Israel. He was a starter during the competition, where France was crowned as champions after defeating Netherlands 2–1 in the final thanks to Saël Kumbedi's brace.

In November 2025, Sarr received his first call-up to the Senegal national team. On 19 December 2025, his request to switch international allegiance to Senegal was approved by FIFA.

For the 2025 edition of the Africa Cup of Nations, Sarr was called up by Senegal as part of their 28 men squad. On 18 January 2026, he started and played the full 120 minutes of the final against Morocco as the replacement for the injured and suspended Kalidou Koulibaly as he helped Senegal to win their 2nd AFCON trophy in the country's history. Overall, Sarr played 3 times for the Senegal national team during this edition of the tournament.

On May 21, 2026, Sarr was officially selected by Senegal's coach Pape Thiaw from his list of 28 players to participate in the 2026 FIFA World Cup.

== Style of play ==
Trained as a centre-back, Sarr occasionally played as a defensive midfielder as part of Lyon's youth teams.

== Career statistics ==
=== Club ===
As of match played 22 November 2026

Appearances and goals by club, season and competition
Club	Season	League			National cup (Note: Includes Coupe de France, FA Cup, Copa del Rey)		League cup (Note: Includes EFL Cup)		Europe		Other		Total	
Club	Season	Division	Apps	Goals	Apps	Goals	Apps	Goals	Apps	Goals	Apps	Goals	Apps	Goals
Lyon B	2022–23	Championnat National 1	18	0	—		—		—		—		18	0
Lyon B	2023–24	Championnat National 2	4	1	—		—		—		—		4	1
Lyon B	Total		22	1	—		—		—		—		22	1
Lyon	2022–23	Ligue 1	1	0	0	0	—		—		—		1	0
Lyon	2023–24	Ligue 1	1	0	1	0	—		—		—		2	0
Lyon	Total		2	0	1	0	—		—		—		3	0
RWDM Brussels (loan)	2023–24	Belgian Pro League	10	0	—		—		—		—		10	0
Strasbourg	2024–25	Ligue 1	27	0	1	0	—		—		—		28	0
Chelsea	2024–25	Premier League	—		—		—		—		1 (Note: Appearance in FIFA Club World Cup)	0	1	0
Chelsea	2025–26	Premier League	3	0	2	0	0	0	1 (Note: Appearance in UEFA Champions League)	0	—		6	0
Chelsea	Total		3	0	2	0	0	0	1	0	1	0	7	0
Strasbourg (loan)	2025–26	Ligue 1	15	0	0	0	—		3 (Note: Appearances in UEFA Conference League)	0	—		18	0
Real Sociedad (loan)	2026–27	La Liga	7	0	0	0	—		4 (Note: Appearances in UEFA Europa League)	0	0	0	11	0
Career total			86	0	4	0	0	0	8	0	1	0	99	0

=== International ===
As of match played 4 October 2026

Appearances and goals by national team and year
National team	Year	Apps	Goals
Senegal	2025	2	0
Senegal	2026	7	0
Total		9	0

== Honours ==
Chelsea

- FIFA Club World Cup: 2025

Lyon U19

- Coupe Gambardella: 2022

France U17

- UEFA European Under-17 Championship: 2022

France U19

- UEFA European Under-19 Championship runner-up: 2024

France U20

- Maurice Revello Tournament: 2025
