= Jon Balda =

Spanish footballer (born 2002)

Personal information
- Full name: Jon Balda Zubiri
- Date of birth: 20 April 2002 (age 24)
- Place of birth: Anoeta, Spain
- Height: 1.74 m (5 ft 9 in)
- Position: Left-back

Team information
- Current team: Real Sociedad B
- Number: 3

Youth career
- 2015–2020: Real Sociedad

Senior career*
Years	Team	Apps	(Gls)
2020–2022	Real Sociedad C	39	(0)
2022–	Real Sociedad B	86	(6)
2024–	Real Sociedad	0	(0)
- * Club domestic league appearances and goals as of 9 June 2026

Jon Balda Zubiri (born 20 April 2002) is a Spanish footballer who plays for Real Sociedad B. Mainly a left-back, he can also play as a left winger.

== Career ==
Born in Anoeta, Gipuzkoa, Basque Country, Balda joined Real Sociedad's youth sides in 2015, aged 13. He made his senior debut with the C-team on 3 January 2021, coming on as a second-half substitute for Jon Karrikaburu and scoring his side's only in a 2–1 Tercera División home loss to Sestao River Club.

Promoted to the reserves in Primera Federación in July 2022, Balda was mainly a backup to Jonathan Gómez and Ander Zoilo, respectively, before becoming a first-choice during the 2024–25 season. He made his first team debut on 21 November 2024, starting in a 5–0 away routing of FC Jove Español San Vicente, for the campaign's Copa del Rey.

On 27 November 2024, Balda renewed his contract with the Txuri-urdin until 2027. The following 13 February, he made his UEFA Europa League debut; despite being a starter in a 2–1 away win over FC Midtjylland, he only lasted 23 minutes on the field before being subbed off after receiving a yellow card early on.
