= Alex Marchal =

Spanish footballer (born 2007)

Personal information
- Full name: Alex Marchal García
- Date of birth: 17 September 2007 (age 19)
- Place of birth: Ansoáin, Spain
- Height: 1.80 m (5 ft 11 in)
- Position: Winger

Team information
- Current team: Real Sociedad
- Number: 29

Youth career
- Txantrea
- 2022–2024: Real Sociedad

Senior career*
Years	Team	Apps	(Gls)
2024–2026	Real Sociedad B	62	(1)
2026–	Real Sociedad	5	(0)

International career^{‡}
2024	Spain U17	1	(0)
2025	Spain U18	1	(0)
2026–	Spain U19	1	(0)
- * Club domestic league appearances and goals as of 18 October 2026 ‡ National team caps and goals as of 14 January 2026

Alex Marchal García (born 17 September 2007) is a Spanish footballer who plays as a left winger for La Liga club Real Sociedad.

== Personal life ==
Marchal's father Irurzun was also a footballer. A striker, he notably represented Real Madrid, Málaga CF and Gimnàstic de Tarragona in La Liga.

== Club career ==
Born in Gorraiz, Navarre, Marchal joined Real Sociedad's youth sides in 2022, from UDC Txantrea. He made his senior debut with the reserves at the age of 16 on 25 August 2024, starting in a 1–0 Primera Federación away win over SD Ponferradina.

In September 2024, Marchal started to train with the first team, and renewed his contract until 2027 on 30 November. He contributed with 33 appearances overall for Sanse during the season, as the club achieved promotion to Segunda División.

Marchal made his professional debut on 29 August 2025, coming on as a second-half substitute for Job Ochieng in a 2–2 home draw against UD Almería. He scored his first professional goal on 21 December, but in a 3–1 home loss to AD Ceuta FC.

On 25 June 2026, Marchal renewed his link with the Txuri-urdin until 2029. He made his first team – and La Liga – debut on 21 August, replacing fellow youth graduate Ander Barrenetxea in a 1–0 loss at Real Betis.

== Career statistics ==
As of match played 18 October 2026

Appearances and goals by club, season and competition
Club	Season	League			Cup		Europe		Other		Total	
Club	Season	Division	Apps	Goals	Apps	Goals	Apps	Goals	Apps	Goals	Apps	Goals
Real Sociedad B	2024–25	Primera Federación	29	0	—		—		6 (Note: Four appearances in 2025 Primera Federación play-offs, two appearances in Premier League Cup)	0	35	0
Real Sociedad B	2025–26	Segunda División	32	1	—		—		3 (Note: Appearances in Premier League Cup)	0	35	1
Real Sociedad B	2026–27	Segunda División	1	0	—		—		—		1	0
Real Sociedad B	Total		62	1	—		—		9	0	71	1
Real Sociedad	2026–27	La Liga	5	0	0	0	0	0	0	0	5	0
Career total			67	1	0	0	0	0	9	0	76	1
