= Iker Gil =

Spanish footballer

Personal information
- Full name: Iker Gil López
- Date of birth: 15 March 2005 (age 21)
- Place of birth: Zaragoza, Spain
- Height: 1.71 m (5 ft 7 in)
- Position: Forward

Team information
- Current team: Real Madrid C

Youth career
- 2010–2012: La Muela
- 2012–2013: Óliver
- 2013–2015: Amistad
- 2015–2017: Zaragoza
- 2017–2024: Real Madrid
- 2023–2024: → Huesca (loan)

Senior career*
Years	Team	Apps	(Gls)
2024–	Real Madrid C	8	(1)
2024	→ Huesca B (loan)	4	(3)
2024	→ Huesca (loan)	1	(0)
2024	→ Tarazona (loan)	11	(1)
2025	→ Ejea (loan)	15	(10)
2026	→ Oviedo B (loan)	13	(4)

International career^{‡}
2019–2020	Spain U15	6	(4)
2022	Spain U17	1	(0)
- * Club domestic league appearances and goals as of 7 May 2026 ‡ National team caps and goals as of 21 April 2022

Iker Gil López (born 15 March 2005) is a Spanish footballer who plays as a forward for Real Madrid C.

== Club career ==
Gil was born in Zaragoza, Aragon, Gil joined Real Zaragoza's youth sides in 2015, after representing UD Amistad, CD Óliver and EF La Muela. In 2017, he moved to Real Madrid's La Fábrica, scoring in a prolific rate before suffering a serious knee injury in 2020 which sidelined him for nearly a year.

On 1 September 2023, Gil was loaned to SD Huesca and was initially assigned to the Juvenil squad. He made his senior debut with the reserves on 7 January 2024, coming on as a second-half substitute in a 4–2 Tercera Federación home win over UD Fraga.

Gil scored his first senior goal on 28 April 2024, netting the B's fourth in a 3–3 home draw against CD Cariñena. He made his first team debut with the Oscenses on 2 June, starting in a 0–0 Segunda División home draw against Levante UD.

On 22 August 2024, Gil joined Primera Federación – Group 1 club Tarazona on a season-long loan deal.

== International career ==
Gil represented Spain at under-15 and under-17 levels.
