= Fernando Marín (footballer) =

Spanish footballer (born 1971)

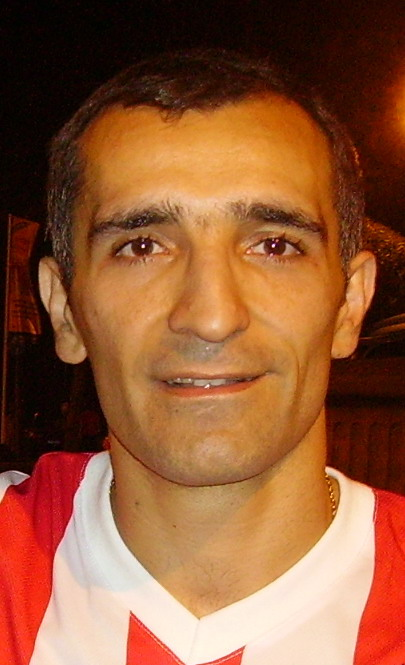
- Marín in 2006

Personal information
- Full name: José Fernando Marín Abizanda
- Date of birth: 27 November 1971 (age 54)
- Place of birth: Arnedo
- Height: 1.78 m (5 ft 10 in)
- Positions: Defender; midfielder

Senior career*
Years	Team	Apps	(Gls)
1991–2000	Logroñés	130	(5)
2000–2002	Badajoz	59	(2)
2002–2004	Logroñés	56	(1)
2004–2005	Varea		
2006–2007	Logroñés	21	(1)
- * Club domestic league appearances and goals

José Fernando Marín Abizanda (born 27 November 1971) is a Spanish former professional footballer who played in La Liga for Logroñés. He is the father of Pablo Marín.

== Career ==
Marín made his senior debut for Logroñés in La Liga on 5 March 1995 against Athletic Club de Bilbao. The following season on 19 May 1996, during the 1995–96 Segunda División campaign, Marin provided the assist for Logroñés top scorer that season Manel to open the scoring in a 2–1 victory away against Toledo at the Estadio Salto del Caballo in the match which secured promotion back to La Liga for his side who were at that time managed by Juande Ramos.

Marín had joined Club Deportivo Logroñés as a young player and has said that he had supported the club as a child. He stated he would have stayed there his whole career but had to join Badajoz in 2000 in order to help Logroñés with their spiralling debts (which would eventually bankrupt the club in 2009). He would return to the club and became club captain during his time at Logroñés, and in total made over 200 league appearances over three separate spells; 1994–2000, 2002–2004, and 2005–2007, and in doing so had the distinction to become the only player ever in the club's history to feature for the team in all four top Spanish divisions: First, Second, Second B and Third.

== Personal life ==
His son Pablo Marin is also a professional footballer who made his La Liga debut for Real Sociedad in October 2022.
