= Dani Díaz =

Spanish footballer (born 2006)

Personal information
- Full name: Daniel Díaz Gándara
- Date of birth: 22 June 2006 (age 20)
- Place of birth: Torrelavega, Spain
- Height: 1.67 m (5 ft 6 in)
- Position: Winger

Team information
- Current team: Real Sociedad B
- Number: 7

Youth career
- Racing Santander
- 2020–2024: Real Sociedad

Senior career*
Years	Team	Apps	(Gls)
2024–	Real Sociedad B	48	(5)
2025–	Real Sociedad	2	(0)

International career^{‡}
2021–2022	Spain U16	9	(2)
2022–2023	Spain U17	9	(1)
2024–	Spain U19	10	(2)
Medal record
Men's football
Representing Spain
UEFA European Under-19 Championship
Winner	2024 Northern Ireland
Runner-up	2025 Romania
- * Club domestic league appearances and goals as of 9 June 2026 ‡ National team caps and goals as of 26 June 2025

Daniel "Dani" Díaz Gándara (born 22 June 2006) is a Spanish footballer who plays mainly as a right winger for Real Sociedad B.

== Club career ==
Díaz was born in Torrelavega, Cantabria, Díaz played for the youth sides of Racing de Santander before agreeing to join Real Sociedad in April 2020. A member of the youth categories, he spent ten months sidelined due to a knee injury in 2023, only returning to action in February 2024.

In July 2024, after finishing his formation, Díaz was promoted straight to the reserves in Primera Federación, making his senior debut on 25 August by coming on as a second-half substitute in a 1–0 away win over SD Ponferradina. He scored his first senior goal the following 1 February, netting the B's second in a 3–0 home win over FC Barcelona Atlètic.

Díaz made his first team – and La Liga – debut on 29 March 2025, replacing Takefusa Kubo late into a 2–1 home success over Real Valladolid.

== International career ==
Díaz represented Spain at under-16, under-17 and under-19 levels, winning the 2024 UEFA European Under-19 Championship with the latter side.

== Career statistics ==
As of match played 14 February 2026

Appearances and goals by club, season and competition
Club	Season	League			Cup		Europe		Other		Total	
Club	Season	Division	Apps	Goals	Apps	Goals	Apps	Goals	Apps	Goals	Apps	Goals
Real Sociedad B	2024–25	Primera Federación	17	1	—		—		—		17	1
Real Sociedad B	2025–26	Segunda División	17	2	—		—		1 (Note: Appearance in Premier League International Cup)	0	18	2
Real Sociedad B	Total		34	3	—		—		1	0	35	3
Real Sociedad	2024–25	La Liga	1	0	0	0	—		—		1	0
Real Sociedad	2025–26	La Liga	1	0	1	0	—		—		2	0
Real Sociedad	Total		2	0	1	0	0	0	—		3	0
Career total			36	3	1	0	0	0	1	0	38	3

== Honours ==
=== Spain U19 ===
- UEFA European Under-19 Championship: 2024; runner-up: 2025
