= Joe Kiker =

Australian rules footballer (1889–1959)

Personal information
- Full name: Joseph Kiker
- Born: 16 May 1889; Burwood, Victoria
- Died: 25 February 1959 (aged 69); Box Hill, Victoria
- Height: 183 cm (6 ft 0 in)
- Weight: 83 kg (183 lb)

Playing career^{1}
Years	Club	Games (Goals)
1909	Richmond	1 (1)
- ^{1} Playing statistics correct to the end of 1909.

Joseph Kiker (16 May 1889 – 25 February 1959) was a former Australian rules footballer who played with Richmond in the Victorian Football League (VFL).

== Football ==
=== Richmond Football Club (VFL) ===
He played in one First XVIII match with Richmond in the Victorian Football League (VFL) in 1909; he was a "new" player that Richmond, which did not make the finals in 1909, tried out in the last match of the 1909 season, against Geelong, on 4 September 1909. Playing at centre half-forward he kicked one of his team's four goals.

=== Melbourne City Football Club (VFA) ===
He was cleared from Richmond to the Melbourne City Football Club in the Victorian Football Association (VFA) in 1912, and played against Footscray in the team's first VFA competition match, on 27 April 1912.

=== Hawthorn Football Club (VFA) ===
The Melbourne City Football Club withdrew from the VFA competition after only two seasons (1912 and 1913), and its place was taken in the 1914 competition by the Hawthorn Football Club. Kiker transferred to Hawthorn and played in its first VFA competition match, against Port Melbourne, on 13 April 1914.
