= Juan Manuel Basurco =

Spanish footballer

Personal information
- Full name: Juan Manuel Basurco Ulacia
- Date of birth: 22 January 1944
- Place of birth: Mutriku, Spain
- Date of death: 20 March 2014 (aged 70)
- Place of death: San Sebastián, Spain
- Position: Forward

Senior career*
Years	Team	Apps	(Gls)
- Mutriku
1969	Club Deportivo San Camilo		
1970	LDU Portoviejo		
1971	Barcelona SC		
1971	LDU Portoviejo		
- * Club domestic league appearances and goals

Juan Manuel Basurco Ulacia (22 January 1944 – 20 March 2014) was a Spanish footballer who played as a forward.

== Early life ==
Basurco was born on 22 January 1944 in Mutriku, Spain. At a young age, he trained to become a priest and embarked on a mission to Ecuador at the age of twenty-five.

== Career ==
Basurco started his career with Spanish side Mutriku FT. In 1969, he signed for Ecuadorian side Club Deportivo San Camilo. One year later, he signed for Ecuadorian side LDU Portoviejo.

Subsequently, he signed for Ecuadorian side Barcelona SC in 1971, where he played in the Copa Libertadores and donated his salary to impoverished children in Guayaquil, Ecuador. The same year, he signed for Ecuadorian side LDU Portoviejo.

== Personal life ==
After retiring from professional football, Basurco returned to Spain where he worked as a philosophy teacher, with his last visit to Ecuador coming in the 1990s. Married with children, he died in San Sebastián, Spain on 20 March 2014.
