= Iker Ropero =

Spanish footballer (born 2006)

Personal information
- Full name: Unax Ayo Larrañaga
- Date of birth: 1 June 2006 (age 20)
- Place of birth: Alegia, Spain
- Height: 1.86 m (6 ft 1 in)
- Position: Centre-back

Team information
- Current team: Real Sociedad B
- Number: 29

Youth career
- Intxurre
- 2021–2023: Real Sociedad

Senior career*
Years	Team	Apps	(Gls)
2023–2025	Real Sociedad C	29	(1)
2024–	Real Sociedad B	3	(0)
2025–2026	→ Barakaldo (loan)	14	(0)
- * Club domestic league appearances and goals as of 12 September 2026

Iker Ropero Saizar (born 1 June 2006) is a Spanish footballer who plays as a centre-back for Real Sociedad B.

== Club career ==
Born in Alegia, Gipuzkoa, Basque Country, Ropero joined Real Sociedad's youth sides in 2021, from Intxurre KKE. In July 2023, after finishing his formation, he was promoted to the C-team in Segunda Federación.

Ropero first appeared with the reserves on 23 November 2024, starting in a 4–1 Primera Federación home routing of Gimnástica Segoviana CF. The following 19 July, after one further match with the B's in the campaign as the club achieved promotion to Segunda División, he moved to Barakaldo CF in the third division on a one-year loan deal.

Back to Sanse in July 2026, Ropero made his professional debut on 12 September, starting in a 3–1 away win over FC Andorra.

== International career ==
In May 2023, Ropero was called up to the Spain national under-17 team.
