= Ibai Aguirre =

Spanish footballer (born 2007)

Personal information
- Full name: Ibai Aguirre Basurco
- Date of birth: 10 January 2007 (age 19)
- Place of birth: Mutriku, Spain
- Position: Midfielder

Team information
- Current team: Real Sociedad B
- Number: 8

Youth career
- Real Sociedad

Senior career*
Years	Team	Apps	(Gls)
2025	Real Sociedad C	16	(1)
2025–	Real Sociedad B	21	(0)
2026–	Real Sociedad	1	(0)

International career^{‡}
2026–	Spain U19	1	(0)
- * Club domestic league appearances and goals as of 9 June 2026 ‡ National team caps and goals as of 14 January 2026

Ibai Aguirre Basurco (born 10 January 2007) is a Spanish footballer who plays as a midfielder for Real Sociedad B.

== Education ==
Alongside his football development in San Sebastián, Aguirre pursues higher education at university level. In addition to his athletic commitments, he studies Education due to his affection for working with children and it also helps him to disconnect from football.

== Career ==
Born in Mutriku, Gipuzkoa, Basque Country, Aguirre was a youth graduate of Real Sociedad. He made his senior debut with the C-team on 16 February 2025, coming on as a second-half substitute in a 1–0 Segunda Federación away loss to CD Calahorra.

After starting the 2025 pre-season with the reserves, Aguirre scored his first senior goal on 19 October of that year, netting the C's second in a 3–2 Tercera Federación away win over Club San Ignacio. He made his professional debut with the B-side on 5 November, starting in a 2–0 Segunda División home win over SD Huesca.

Aguirre made his first team – and La Liga – debut on 4 April 2026, coming on as a late substitute for fellow youth graduate Beñat Turrientes in a 2–0 home win over Levante UD.

== Career statistics ==
=== Club ===
As of match played 4 April 2026

Appearances and goals by club, season and competition
Club	Season	League			Cup		Europe		Other		Total	
Club	Season	Division	Apps	Goals	Apps	Goals	Apps	Goals	Apps	Goals	Apps	Goals
Real Sociedad C	2024–25	Segunda Federación	12	0	—		—		—		12	0
Real Sociedad C	2025–26	Segunda Federación	4	1	—		—		—		4	1
Real Sociedad C	Total		16	1	—		—		—		16	1
Real Sociedad B	2025–26	Segunda División	17	0	—		—		—		17	0
Real Sociedad	2025–26	La Liga	1	0	0	0	—		—		1	0
Career total			34	1	0	0	0	0	0	0	34	1
