= Zarautz KE =

Zarautz
- Full name: Zarautz Kirol Elkartea
- Founded: 1944
- Ground: Asti, Zarautz, Basque Country, Spain
- Capacity: 800
- Chairman: (Spain) Juan Mari Arrizabalaga
- Manager: (Spain) Joseba Zubizarreta
- League: Tercera Federación – Group 4
- 2024–25: División de Honor, 2nd of 18 (promoted via play-offs)
Home colours	Away colours

Zarautz Kirol Elkartea is a Spanish football team based in Zarautz, in the autonomous community of Basque Country. Founded in 1944 it plays in Tercera Federación – Group 4, holding home games at Estadio Asti, which has a capacity of 800 spectators.

== History ==
=== Club background ===
- Club Deportivo Zarauz (1944–1981)
- Club Deportivo Zarautz (1981–1993)
- Zarautz Kirol Elkartea (1993–)

== Season to season ==
Season	Tier	Division	Place	Copa del Rey
1944–45	5	2ª Reg.	2nd	
1945–46	4	1ª Reg.	4th	
1946–47	4	1ª Reg.	2nd	
1947–48	4	1ª Reg.	5th	
1948–49	4	1ª Reg.	4th	
1949–50	4	1ª Reg.	5th	
1950–51	4	1ª Reg.	14th	
1951–52	4	1ª Reg.	12th	
1952–53	4	1ª Reg.	3rd	
1953–54	4	1ª Reg.	5th	
1954–55	4	1ª Reg.	8th	
1955–56	4	1ª Reg.	7th	
1956–57	4	1ª Reg.	8th	
1957–58	4	1ª Reg.	6th	
1958–59	5	2ª Reg.	3rd	
1959–60	4	1ª Reg.	10th	
1960–61	4	1ª Reg.	8th	
1961–62	4	1ª Reg.	12th	
1962–63	DNP			
1963–64	DNP			

Season	Tier	Division	Place	Copa del Rey
1964–65	DNP			
1965–66	4	1ª Reg.	7th	
1966–67	4	1ª Reg.	8th	
1967–68	DNP			
1968–69	DNP			
1969–70	DNP			
1970–71	5	2ª Reg.	11th	
1971–72	5	2ª Reg.	2nd	
1972–73	4	1ª Reg.	12th	
1973–74	4	1ª Reg.	16th	
1974–75	5	1ª Reg.	5th	
1975–76	5	1ª Reg.	4th	
1976–77	5	1ª Reg.	10th	
1977–78	6	1ª Reg.	1st	
1978–79	5	Reg. Pref.	11th	
1979–80	5	Reg. Pref.	20th	
1980–81	6	1ª Reg.	1st	
1981–82	5	Reg. Pref.	17th	
1982–83	5	Reg. Pref.	8th	
1983–84	5	Reg. Pref.	7th	

Season	Tier	Division	Place	Copa del Rey
1984–85	5	Reg. Pref.	5th	
1985–86	5	Reg. Pref.	9th	
1986–87	5	Reg. Pref.	9th	
1987–88	5	Reg. Pref.	8th	
1988–89	5	Reg. Pref.	13th	
1989–90	5	Reg. Pref.	1st	
1990–91	4	3ª	13th	
1991–92	5	Reg. Pref.	12th	
1992–93	5	Reg. Pref.	9th	
1993–94	5	Reg. Pref.	14th	
1994–95	5	Reg. Pref.	7th	
1995–96	5	Reg. Pref.	2nd	
1996–97	5	Reg. Pref.	13th	
1997–98	5	Reg. Pref.	18th	
1998–99	6	1ª Reg.	3rd	
1999–2000	6	1ª Reg.	2nd	
2000–01	5	Reg. Pref.	3rd	
2001–02	5	Reg. Pref.	6th	
2002–03	5	Reg. Pref.	11th	
2003–04	5	Reg. Pref.	3rd	

Season	Tier	Division	Place	Copa del Rey
2004–05	5	Reg. Pref.	3rd	
2005–06	5	Reg. Pref.	4th	
2006–07	5	Reg. Pref.	1st	
2007–08	4	3ª	16th	
2008–09	4	3ª	17th	
2009–10	5	Div. Hon.	1st	
2010–11	4	3ª	13th	
2011–12	4	3ª	20th	
2012–13	5	Div. Hon.	10th	
2013–14	5	Div. Hon.	14th	
2014–15	5	Div. Hon.	15th	
2015–16	5	Div. Hon.	9th	
2016–17	5	Div. Hon.	10th	
2017–18	5	Div. Hon.	6th	
2018–19	5	Div. Hon.	9th	
2019–20	5	Div. Hon.	10th	
2020–21	5	Div. Hon.	4th	
2021–22	6	Div. Hon.	8th	
2022–23	6	Div. Hon.	8th	
2023–24	6	Div. Hon.	3rd	

Season	Tier	Division	Place	Copa del Rey
2024–25	6	Div. Hon.	2nd	
2025–26	5	3ª Fed.		

- 5 seasons in Tercera División
- 1 season in Tercera Federación

== Famous players ==
- (Spain) Estanislao Argote
- (Equatorial Guinea) (Spain) Juan Cuyami
