= Aitor Fraga =

Spanish footballer (born 2003)

Personal information
- Full name: Aitor Fraga Torres
- Date of birth: 9 March 2003 (age 23)
- Place of birth: Hernani, Spain
- Height: 1.94 m (6 ft 4 in)
- Position: Goalkeeper

Team information
- Current team: Real Sociedad B
- Number: 1

Youth career
- 2017–2021: Real Sociedad

Senior career*
Years	Team	Apps	(Gls)
2021–2024	Real Sociedad C	39	(0)
2021–2022	→ Beti Kozkor (loan)	20	(0)
2023–	Real Sociedad B	76	(0)

International career
2019	Spain U16	2	(0)
2019	Spain U17	2	(0)
2024–	Spain U21	2	(0)
- * Club domestic league appearances and goals as of 9 June 2026

Aitor Fraga Torres (born 9 March 2003) is a Spanish footballer who plays as a goalkeeper for Real Sociedad B.

== Club career ==
Born in Hernani, Gipuzkoa, Basque Country, Fraga joined Real Sociedad's youth sides in 2017, aged 14. In 2019, while still a youth, he began training with the first team.

On 17 August 2021, after finishing his formation, Fraga was loaned to Tercera División RFEF side Beti Kozkor KE for one year. Upon returning in July 2022, he was assigned to the C-team in Segunda Federación.

A regular starter for the C's, Fraga first appeared with the reserves on 9 December 2023, starting in a 1–1 Primera Federación away draw against CF Fuenlabrada. He subsequently overtook Gaizka Ayesa as the starter for the B-side, and renewed his contract until 2029 on 29 January 2025.

Fraga was a first-choice for the B's during the 2024–25 season, but missed out the last three matches of the promotion play-offs due to international duty; he still returned on time to watch Sanse's promotion to Segunda División from the stands. He made his professional debut on 17 August, starting in a 1–0 home win over Real Zaragoza.

== International career ==
On 9 April 2019, Fraga was called up to the Spain national under-16 team for the year's Montaigu Tournament. He also played with the under-17s in that same year, before receiving a call-up to the under-21 team in October 2024.

Fraga made his debut with the under-21s on 15 October 2024, starting in a 6–0 win over Malta, and was included in the 23-man squad for the 2025 UEFA European Under-21 Championship the following June. He was a backup to Alejandro Iturbe during the competition as his side was knocked out in the quarterfinals.
