= Real Sociedad B =

Spanish football team based in San Sebastián

- Full name: Real Sociedad de Fútbol, S.A.D. "B"
- Nickname: Sanse
- Founded: 1955; 71 years ago as Real Sociedad de Fútbol Junior
- Stadium: Zubieta
- Capacity: 2,500
- President: Jokin Aperribay
- Head coach: Ion Ansotegi
- League: Segunda División
- 2025–26: Segunda División, 15th of 22
Home colours	Away colours	Third colours

Real Sociedad de Fútbol "B" (also known as Sanse) is a Spanish football team based in San Sebastián, in the autonomous community of Basque Country. Founded in 1955, it is the reserve team of Real Sociedad and plays in Segunda División, holding home games at Campo José Luis Orbegozo holding 2,500 spectators of the Zubieta Facilities.

Unlike in nations such as England, reserve teams in Spain play in the same football pyramid as their senior team rather than a separate league. However, reserve teams cannot play in the same division as their senior team. Therefore, the team is ineligible for promotion to La Liga, the division in which the main side plays. Reserve teams are also no longer permitted to enter the Copa del Rey.

== History ==
The team's origin dates from 1952 when the Real Sociedad youth team were runners-up in the Copa del Rey Juvenil and the club's board sought to bridge the gap between the talented teenagers and the senior team: the concept of Real Sociedad de Fútbol Junior was introduced, but economic problems delayed its first official match until 1955, immediately after the youth team won the Copa Juvenil. After quickly gaining promotion to the third tier to become part of the national football pyramid, a name change was required to differentiate them from the senior team, and San Sebastián Club de Fútbol was chosen. They first reached the second division in 1959–60, and achieved a best ever classification in the category after finishing fifth two years later; however, as the main squad was relegated from La Liga, San Sebastián was ineligible for promotion, being relegated instead.

In 1980, Sanse was promoted to the newly created Segunda División B, remaining in that category for 17 consecutive seasons. Afterwards they fluctuated between the third and fourth tiers, reaching the promotion playoffs of the former in 1991 and 2006 but subsequently falling short. In 1991, the club was renamed Real Sociedad de Fútbol B, due to Liga de Fútbol Profesional's rules prohibiting B clubs from having different names from their parent club, the exceptions being Real Madrid Castilla and Sevilla Atlético. Upon celebrating its 50-year anniversary in 2007, the team had used 486 players, preparing dozens to represent the first team including the vast majority of the squad that won the Spanish championship twice in succession (1980–81 and 1981–82).

A change in the club structure from 2016 meant that most Sanse players would be promoted from a new subsidiary, Real Sociedad C (previously known as Berio), who would play in Tercera División with under-20 graduates of the club's youth system. The Real Sociedad C team must play at least one division below Real Sociedad B.

In the 2017–18 season, the team finished third in Segunda División B. In 2020–21, Sanse won the Segunda Division B and gained promotion to the Segunda Division, 59 years since their last appearance, after defeating Algeciras in the promotion play-off finals. On 22 May 2022, Sanse was relegated back to the third tier after only one season in the second tier.

=== Club names ===
- Real Sociedad de Fútbol Junior – (1955–57)
- San Sebastián Club de Fútbol – (1957–91)
- Real Sociedad de Fútbol "B" – (1991–92)
- Real Sociedad de Fútbol, S.A.D. "B" – (1992–)

== Season to season ==
- As a reserve team of Real Sociedad

Season	Tier	Division	Place	Copa del Rey
1955–56	5	2ª Reg.	1st	
1956–57	4	1ª Reg.	4th	
1957–58	3	3ª	5th	
1958–59	3	3ª	3rd	
1959–60	3	3ª	1st	
1960–61	2	2ª	9th	First round
1961–62	2	2ª	5th	Round of 32
1962–63	3	3ª	9th	
1963–64	3	3ª	5th	
1964–65	3	3ª	13th	
1965–66	3	3ª	8th	
1966–67	3	3ª	11th	
1967–68	3	3ª	5th	
1968–69	3	3ª	4th	
1969–70	3	3ª	3rd	Third round
1970–71	3	3ª	8th	First round
1971–72	3	3ª	6th	
1972–73	3	3ª	8th	

Season	Tier	Division	Place	Copa del Rey
1973–74	3	3ª	10th	
1974–75	3	3ª	6th	
1975–76	3	3ª	7th	
1976–77	3	3ª	12th	
1977–78	4	3ª	3rd	
1978–79	4	3ª	3rd	
1979–80	4	3ª	1st	
1980–81	3	2ª B	8th	
1981–82	3	2ª B	11th	First round
1982–83	3	2ª B	6th	
1983–84	3	2ª B	9th	
1984–85	3	2ª B	17th	
1985–86	3	2ª B	8th	
1986–87	3	2ª B	15th	Fourth round
1987–88	3	2ª B	6th	Second round
1988–89	3	2ª B	3rd	Third round
1989–90	3	2ª B	5th	
1990–91	3	2ª B	4th	DNP

- Merged with Real Sociedad

Season	Tier	Division	Place
1991–92	3	2ª B	8th
1992–93	3	2ª B	9th
1993–94	3	2ª B	7th
1994–95	3	2ª B	10th
1995–96	3	2ª B	13th
1996–97	3	2ª B	17th
1997–98	4	3ª	3rd
1998–99	4	3ª	1st
1999–2000	4	3ª	1st
2000–01	4	3ª	2nd
2001–02	3	2ª B	17th
2002–03	4	3ª	2nd
2003–04	3	2ª B	10th
2004–05	3	2ª B	5th
2005–06	3	2ª B	2nd
2006–07	3	2ª B	7th
2007–08	3	2ª B	12th
2008–09	3	2ª B	18th
2009–10	4	3ª	1st
2010–11	3	2ª B	11th

Season	Tier	Division	Place
2011–12	3	2ª B	12th
2012–13	3	2ª B	11th
2013–14	3	2ª B	12th
2014–15	3	2ª B	14th
2015–16	3	2ª B	7th
2016–17	3	2ª B	10th
2017–18	3	2ª B	3rd
2018–19	3	2ª B	12th
2019–20	3	2ª B	5th
2020–21	3	2ª B	1st
2021–22	2	2ª	20th
2022–23	3	1ª Fed.	5th
2023–24	3	1ª Fed.	9th
2024–25	3	1ª Fed.	3rd
2025–26	2	2ª	15th
2026–27	2	2ª	

- 5 seasons in Segunda División
- 3 seasons in Primera Federación
- 35 seasons in Segunda División B
- 27 seasons in Tercera División

== Current squad ==
As of 20 August 2026

Note: Flags indicate national team as defined under FIFA eligibility rules; some limited exceptions apply. Players may hold more than one non-FIFA nationality.

No.	Pos.	Nation	Player
1	GK	ESP	Aitor Fraga
2	DF	ESP	Jon Garro
3	DF	ESP	Jon Balda
4	DF	ESP	Luken Beitia
5	DF	JPN	Kazunari Kita
6	MF	FRA	Alex Lebarbier
7	FW	ESP	Dani Díaz
8	MF	ESP	Ibai Aguirre
9	FW	ESP	Ekain Orobengoa
10	FW	ESP	Arkaitz Mariezkurrena
11	FW	ESP	Alex Marchal
12	MF	ESP	Joan Oleaga
13	GK	FRA	Theo Folgado
14	MF	ESP	Tomy Carbonell

No.	Pos.	Nation	Player
15	DF	ESP	Iker Calderón
16	MF	ESP	Gorka Gorosabel
17	MF	ESP	Lander Astiazaran
18	FW	ESP	Gorka Carrera
19	FW	ESP	Javier Soroeta
20	FW	ESP	Sydney Osazuwa
21	MF	ESP	Jon Eceizabarrena
22	DF	ESP	Iñaki Rupérez
23	DF	ESP	Unax Agote
24	DF	ESP	Unax Ayo
29	DF	ESP	Iker Ropero
32	GK	ESP	Lander Olasagasti
34	FW	GHA	Andrews Adjabeng

=== Reserve team ===
Note: Flags indicate national team as defined under FIFA eligibility rules; some limited exceptions apply. Players may hold more than one non-FIFA nationality.

No.	Pos.	Nation	Player
26	DF	ESP	Beñat Isasa
30	DF	ESP	Peru Larrañaga
31	MF	ESP	Oihan Telletxea
33	FW	CUB	Eloy Nebreda

No.	Pos.	Nation	Player
35	GK	ESP	Daniel Galilea
36	FW	ESP	Hodei Garitaonaindia
38	FW	ESP	Xuban Fernández

=== Out on loan ===
Note: Flags indicate national team as defined under FIFA eligibility rules; some limited exceptions apply. Players may hold more than one non-FIFA nationality.

No.	Pos.	Nation	Player
—	FW	ESP	Ibai Cabo (at Amorebieta until 30 June 2027)
—	FW	ESP	Xalbat Larralde (at Amorebieta until 30 June 2027)

=== Current technical staff ===
Position	Staff
Head coach	(Spain) Ion Ansotegi
Assistant coach	(Spain) Imanol Agirretxe
Goalkeeping coach	(Spain) Luis Castro
Analyst	(Spain) Jon Gorrotxategi
Fitness coach	(Spain) Karla Larburu
Mental coach	(Spain) Jon Ollora
Physiotherapist	(Spain) Asier Caballe (Spain) Txomin Zinkunegi
Nutritionist	(Spain) Natalia Ibañez
Match delegate	(Spain) Iñaki Arostegi

Last updated: 14 July 2025
Source: Sanse (in Spanish)

== Honours ==
- Segunda División B:
  - Winners: (Note: Third tier) 2020–21 (Note: Won First Phase group and Second Phase group; promoted in play-offs)
- Tercera División:
  - Winners: 1959–60 (Note: Promoted in play-offs)
  - Winners: (Note: Fourth tier) 1979–80, (Note: Promoted directly) 1998–99, (Note: Not promoted in play-offs) 1999–2000, (Note: Not promoted in play-offs) 2009–10 (Note: Promoted in play-offs)

== Stadium ==
Real Sociedad B hold home games at Instalaciones de Zubieta, which holds 2,500 spectators.

Players of both the first and the second teams train in these facilities, with Sanse's players being nicknamed "Potrillos" ("Colts") as the grounds are located near the city's horse racetrack.

== Former coaches ==
- Xabi Alonso
- Imanol Alguacil
- Periko Alonso
- José Ramón Eizmendi
- Imanol Idiakez
- Meho Kodro
- Asier Santana

== See also ==
- Category:Real Sociedad B footballers
- Real Sociedad
- Real Sociedad C
- Real Sociedad cantera – youth section
