= Real Sociedad C =

Association football club in Spain

- Full name: Real Sociedad de Fútbol, S.A.D. "C"
- Founded: 1998 (as CD Berio FT); 2016 (as Real Sociedad "C")
- Ground: Zubieta Facilities, San Sebastián, Basque Country, Spain
- Capacity: 2,500
- President: Jokin Aperribay
- Head coach: Asier Eizaguirre
- League: Tercera Federación – Group 4
- 2025–26: Tercera Federación – Group 4, 6th of 18
Home colours	Away colours	Third colours

Real Sociedad de Fútbol "C" is a Spanish football team based in San Sebastián, in the autonomous community of Basque Country. It is the second reserve team of Real Sociedad and plays in Tercera Federación – Group 4.

== History ==
Founded in 1998 as Club Deportivo Berio Futbol Taldea, in 2016 the team was integrated fully into the structure of Real Sociedad, becoming its second reserve squad. In the previous two seasons, after gaining promotion to the Tercera División, Berio operated as a farm team for Real Sociedad but still played at their own stadium wearing their traditional green kit. From then on, they would play at Zubieta and wear Real Sociedad blue-and-white colours.

In general, the Real C squad consists graduates from the club's youth system aged between 17 and 20, and successful players will move up to Real Sociedad B (Sanse) after one or two seasons. The Real Sociedad C team must play at least one division below Sanse, who must themselves play one division lower than the main Real Sociedad team. Neither reserve team can enter the Copa del Rey.

In 2021, the team achieved a promotion of sorts, finishing second in their Tercera group to move to the Segunda División RFEF, one of only three teams in the Basque group to do so – as this was part of a nationwide restructuring they would remain in the fourth level, though now with a regional rather than a local profile. In the same season, the Real B-team gained promotion to the second tier.

== Season to season ==
=== As CD Berio FT ===
Season	Tier	Division	Place	Copa del Rey
1998–99	6	1ª Reg.	8th	
1999–2000	6	1ª Reg.	3rd	
2000–01	6	1ª Reg.	2nd	
2001–02	5	Reg. Pref.	9th	
2002–03	5	Reg. Pref.	5th	
2003–04	5	Reg. Pref.	2nd	
2004–05	4	3ª	19th	
2005–06	5	Reg. Pref.	13th	
2006–07	5	Reg. Pref.	6th	

Season	Tier	Division	Place	Copa del Rey
2007–08	5	Reg. Pref.	2nd	
2008–09	5	Reg. Pref.	9th	
2009–10	5	Div. Hon.	11th	
2010–11	5	Div. Hon.	10th	
2011–12	5	Div. Hon.	7th	
2012–13	5	Div. Hon.	5th	
2013–14	5	Div. Hon.	1st	
2014–15	4	3ª	8th	
2015–16	4	3ª	13th	

=== As Real Sociedad "C" ===
Season	Tier	Division	Place
2016–17	4	3ª	15th
2017–18	4	3ª	6th
2018–19	4	3ª	7th
2019–20	4	3ª	13th
2020–21	4	3ª	2nd
2021–22	4	2ª RFEF	3rd
2022–23	4	2ª Fed.	7th
2023–24	4	2ª Fed.	9th
2024–25	4	2ª Fed.	16th
2025–26	5	3ª Fed.	6th
2026–27	5	3ª Fed.	

- 4 seasons in Segunda Federación/Segunda División RFEF
- 8 seasons in Tercera División
- 2 seasons in Tercera Federación

== Current squad ==
As of 13 September 2026

Note: Flags indicate national team as defined under FIFA eligibility rules; some limited exceptions apply. Players may hold more than one non-FIFA nationality.

No.	Pos.	Nation	Player
1	GK	HUN	Ákos Tompa
2	DF	ESP	Joel Martínez
3	DF	ESP	Pello Arana
4	DF	ESP	Mikel Alberro
5	MF	ESP	Manu Sáenz
7	FW	ESP	Xuban Fernández
9	FW	ESP	Oihan Chávez
10	FW	CUB	Eloy Nebreda
11	MF	ESP	Markel Elkano
13	GK	ESP	Erik Pereira
14	MF	ESP	Danel López
15	MF	ESP	Omar Mariño
16	DF	ESP	Ekain Ugalde

No.	Pos.	Nation	Player
17	MF	ESP	Naier Ezkerra
19	FW	ESP	Hodei Garitaonaindia
20	FW	ESP	Beñat Mancisidor
21	FW	ESP	Raúl Rodríguez
25	GK	ESP	Daniel Galilea
26	MF	ESP	Pablo Santana
28	MF	ESP	Oihan Telletxea
29	MF	GHA	Adama Sylla
30	DF	ESP	Peru Larrañaga
33	DF	ESP	Beñat Isasa
37	MF	ESP	Iker Letamendia
42	DF	ESP	Julen Gaztañaga
—	DF	ESP	Jon De Orue

=== From Youth Academy ===
Note: Flags indicate national team as defined under FIFA eligibility rules; some limited exceptions apply. Players may hold more than one non-FIFA nationality.

No.	Pos.	Nation	Player
27	FW	ESP	Xabier Echarri
29	MF	ESP	Iván Lozano

No.	Pos.	Nation	Player
34	DF	ESP	Aimar Borinaga

=== Out on loan ===
Note: Flags indicate national team as defined under FIFA eligibility rules; some limited exceptions apply. Players may hold more than one non-FIFA nationality.

No.	Pos.	Nation	Player

== See also ==
- Category:Real Sociedad C footballers
- Real Sociedad
- Real Sociedad B
- Real Sociedad cantera
