= Roberto López (footballer, born 2000) =

Spanish footballer

Personal information
- Full name: Roberto López Alcaide
- Date of birth: 24 April 2000 (age 26)
- Place of birth: Zaragoza, Spain
- Height: 1.79 m (5 ft 10 in)
- Position: Attacking midfielder

Team information
- Current team: Eldense

Youth career
- Amistad
- 2015–2018: Real Sociedad

Senior career*
Years	Team	Apps	(Gls)
2017–2018	Real Sociedad C	5	(1)
2018–2022	Real Sociedad B	82	(18)
2019–2024	Real Sociedad	21	(3)
2022–2023	→ Mirandés (loan)	40	(7)
2023–2024	→ Tenerife (loan)	40	(7)
2024–2026	Leganés	37	(3)
2026–	Eldense	0	(0)

International career^{‡}
2018	Spain U18	3	(0)
2018–2019	Spain U19	5	(1)
2020–2021	Spain U21	3	(2)
- * Club domestic league appearances and goals as of 9 June 2026 ‡ National team caps and goals as of 30 September 2021

Roberto López Alcaide (born 24 April 2000) is a Spanish professional footballer who plays as an attacking midfielder for CD Eldense.

== Club career ==
Born in Zaragoza, Aragon, López joined Real Sociedad's youth setup in 2015, from UD Amistad. During the 2017–18 season, while still a youth, he made his senior debut with the C-team in Tercera División.

On 20 June 2018, López renewed his contract until 2022 and was promoted to the reserves in Segunda División B. On 7 December, after already being a regular starter for the B-side, he further extended his deal until 2025.

López made his professional – and La Liga – debut on 14 January 2019, coming on as a second-half substitute for Luca Sangalli in a 3–2 home win against RCD Espanyol. Definitely promoted to the main squad for 2020–21, he scored his first goal in the top tier on 13 September 2020 by netting the equalizer in a 1–1 away draw against Real Valladolid. He returned the reserves to reinforce their squad after they were promoted to the Segunda División for the 2021–22 season.

On 27 June 2022, López was loaned to second division side CD Mirandés, for one year. On 26 June of the following year, he moved to fellow league team CD Tenerife also in a season-long loan, with an obligatory buyout clause in case of promotion.

On 10 July 2024, López signed a three-year contract with CD Leganés, newly promoted to the top tier. On 1 September 2026, he terminated his link with the club, and signed a one-year deal with second division side CD Eldense just hours later.

== Career statistics ==
=== Club ===
As of 1 July 2021

Appearances and goals by club, season and competition
Club	Season	League			National Cup		Continental		Total	
Club	Season	Division	Apps	Goals	Apps	Goals	Apps	Goals	Apps	Goals
Real Sociedad B	2018–19	Segunda División B	28	7	—		—		28	7
Real Sociedad B	2019–20	Segunda División B	26	7	—		—		26	7
Real Sociedad B	Total		54	14	0	0	0	0	54	14
Real Sociedad	2018–19	La Liga	1	0	0	0	—		1	0
Real Sociedad	2019–20	La Liga	3	0	0	0	—		3	0
Real Sociedad	2020–21	La Liga	17	3	1	0	2 (Note: Appearance(s) in UEFA Europa League)	0	20	3
Real Sociedad	Total		21	3	1	0	2	0	24	3
Career total			75	17	1	0	2	0	78	17
