= Gaizka Ayesa =

Spanish footballer (born 2001)

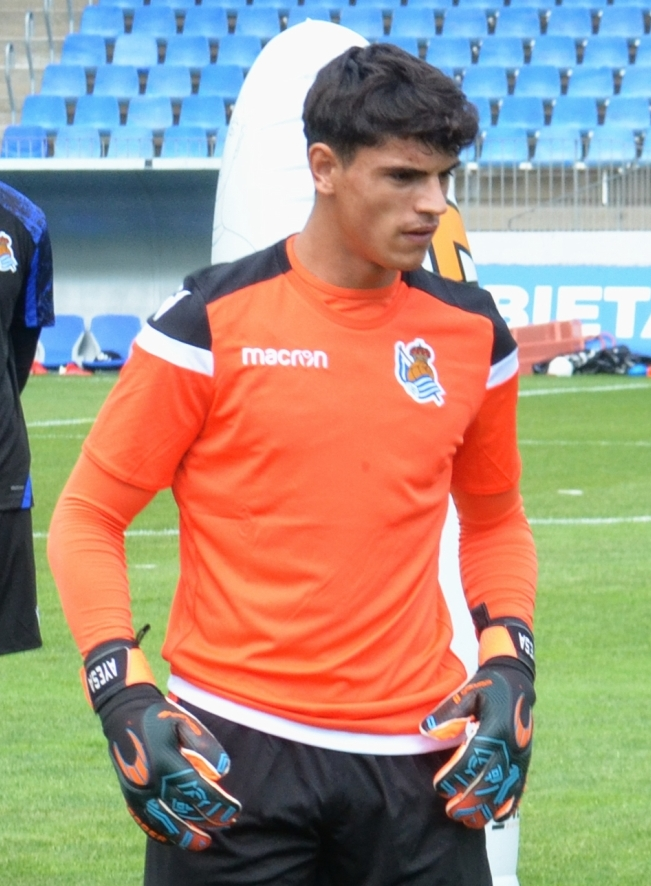
- Ayesa training with Real Sociedad in 2021

Personal information
- Full name: Gaizka Ayesa Burgui
- Date of birth: 2 April 2001 (age 25)
- Place of birth: Ansoáin, Spain
- Height: 1.82 m (6 ft 0 in)
- Position: Goalkeeper

Team information
- Current team: Gimnàstic

Youth career
- 2013–2019: Real Sociedad

Senior career*
Years	Team	Apps	(Gls)
2019–2020	Real Sociedad C	7	(0)
2020–2024	Real Sociedad B	65	(0)
2022–2023	→ Numancia (loan)	27	(0)
2024–2026	Alcorcón	68	(0)
2026–	Gimnàstic	0	(0)
- * Club domestic league appearances and goals as of 10 June 2026

Gaizka Ayesa Burgui (born 2 April 2001) is a Spanish professional footballer who plays as a goalkeeper for Gimnàstic de Tarragona.

== Career ==
Ayesa was born in Ansoáin, Navarre, and joined Real Sociedad's youth setup in 2013, aged 12. He made his senior debut with the C-team on 2 March 2019, starting in a 7–1 Tercera División home routing of SD Deusto.

Ayesa first appeared with the reserves on 12 January 2020, starting in a 2–0 away win against Burgos CF in the Segunda División B championship. On 4 February 2021, he renewed his contract with the Txuri-urdin until 2025, and was sparingly used during the campaign as his side returned to Segunda División after 59 years.

Ayesa made his professional debut on 29 August 2021, starting in a 0–0 home draw against CF Fuenlabrada. On 9 July of the following year, he was loaned to Primera Federación side CD Numancia for the season.

On 3 July 2024, Ayesa signed as a free agent with AD Alcorcón. On 24 June 2026, after two seasons as a starter, he moved to fellow third division side Gimnàstic de Tarragona on a two-year contract.

== Career statistics ==
As of match played 17 December 2023

Appearances and goals by club, season and competition
Club	Season	League			Cup		Europe		Other		Total	
Club	Season	Division	Apps	Goals	Apps	Goals	Apps	Goals	Apps	Goals	Apps	Goals
Real Sociedad C	2019–20	Tercera Federación	7	0	—		—		—		7	0
Real Sociedad B	2017–18	Segunda División B	0	0	—		—		—		0	0
Real Sociedad B	2018–19	Segunda División B	0	0	—		—		—		0	0
Real Sociedad B	2019–20	Segunda División B	4	0	—		—		—		4	0
Real Sociedad B	2020–21	Segunda División B	12	0	—		—		2 (Note: Appearances in Segunda División B play-offs)	0	14	0
Real Sociedad B	2021–22	Segunda División	21	0	0	0	—		—		21	0
Real Sociedad B	2023–24	Primera Federación	16	0	—		—		—		16	0
Real Sociedad B	Total		53	0	0	0	—		—		53	0
Real Sociedad	2019–20	La Liga	0	0	0	0	0	0	—		0	0
Real Sociedad	2020–21	La Liga	0	0	0	0	0	0	0	0	0	0
Real Sociedad	2021–22	La Liga	0	0	0	0	0	0	—		0	0
Real Sociedad	2023–24	La Liga	0	0	0	0	0	0	—		0	0
Real Sociedad	Total		0	0	0	0	0	0	0	0	0	0
Numancia (loan)	2022–23	Primera Federación	27	0	1	0	—		—		28	0
Career total			87	0	1	0	0	0	2	0	90	0
