= Ander Guevara =

Spanish footballer (born 1997)

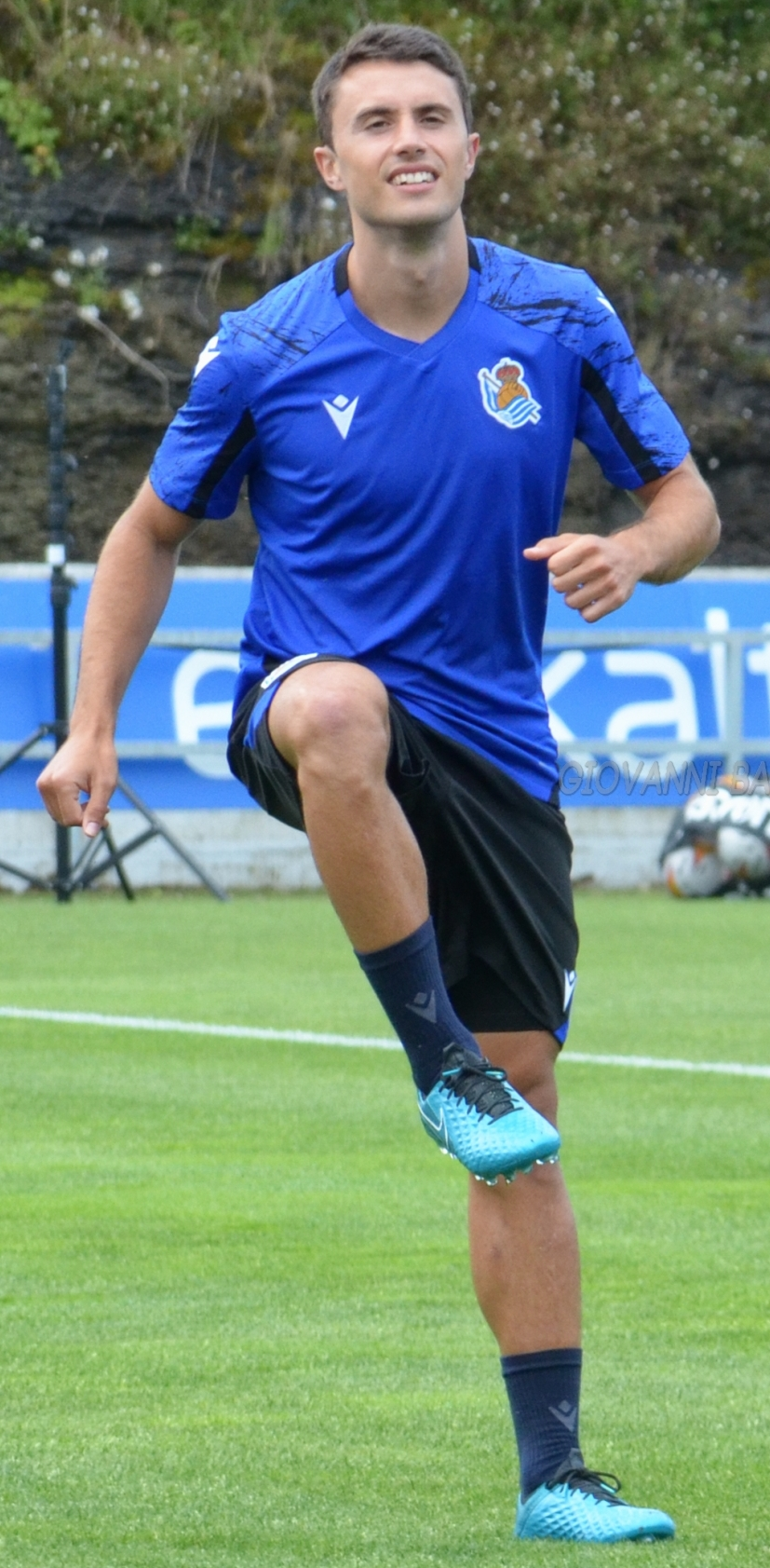
- Guevara with Real Sociedad in 2021

Personal information
- Full name: Ander Guevara Lajo
- Date of birth: 7 July 1997 (age 29)
- Place of birth: Vitoria, Spain
- Height: 1.80 m (5 ft 11 in)
- Position: Central midfielder

Team information
- Current team: Alavés
- Number: 6

Youth career
- Alavés
- 2012–2015: Real Sociedad

Senior career*
| Years | Team | Apps | (Gls) |
| 2015–2017 | Real Sociedad C | 48 | (3) |
| 2016–2019 | Real Sociedad B | 71 | (1) |
| 2017–2023 | Real Sociedad | 71 | (1) |
| 2023– | Alavés | 95 | (2) |

International career^{‡}
| 2020– | Basque Country | 2 | (0) |
- * Club domestic league appearances and goals as of 27 May 2026 ‡ National team caps and goals as of 24 March 2024

Ander Guevara Lajo (born 7 July 1997) is a Spanish professional footballer who plays as a central midfielder for La Liga club Alavés.

== Club career ==
=== Real Sociedad ===
Born in Vitoria-Gasteiz, Álava, Basque Country, Guevara joined Real Sociedad's youth setup in 2012, from Deportivo Alavés. He was promoted to the farm team ahead of the 2015–16 season, and made his debut during the campaign in Tercera División.

Guevara made his debut with the reserves on 1 October 2016, coming on as a second-half substitute in a 1–2 Segunda División B home loss against CF Fuenlabrada. The following 17 June, he renewed his contract until 2020 and was definitely promoted to the B-side.

Guevara made his first team debut on 26 October 2017, replacing fellow youth graduate Rubén Pardo in a 1–0 away win against Lleida Esportiu, for the season's Copa del Rey. He made his La Liga debut on 15 March 2019, starting in a 1–1 home draw against Levante UD.

On 7 June 2019, Guevara renewed his contract until 2024, being definitely promoted to the main squad two days later.

=== Alavés ===
On 9 July 2023, Guevara returned to his first club Alavés on a four-year contract.

== International career ==
Guevara has played for the unofficial Basque Country team, making his debut against Costa Rica in November 2020.

== Career statistics ==
=== Club ===
As of 26 May 2024

Appearances and goals by club, season and competition
| Club | Season | League | | | National cup | | Continental | | Other | | Total | |
| Club | Season | Division | Apps | Goals | Apps | Goals | Apps | Goals | Apps | Goals | Apps | Goals |
|---|---|---|---|---|---|---|---|---|---|---|---|---|
| Real Sociedad B | 2016–17 | Segunda División B | 13 | 0 | — | | — | | — | | 13 | 0 |
| Real Sociedad B | 2017–18 | Segunda División B | 32 | 0 | — | | — | | 2 (Note: Appearance(s) in Promotion Playoffs) | 0 | 34 | 0 |
| Real Sociedad B | 2018–19 | Segunda División B | 26 | 1 | — | | — | | — | | 26 | 1 |
| Real Sociedad B | Total | | 71 | 1 | — | | — | | 2 | 0 | 73 | 1 |
| Real Sociedad | 2017–18 | La Liga | 0 | 0 | 1 | 0 | — | | — | | 1 | 0 |
| Real Sociedad | 2018–19 | La Liga | 1 | 0 | 0 | 0 | — | | — | | 1 | 0 |
| Real Sociedad | 2019–20 | La Liga | 14 | 0 | 7 (Note: Includes appearance in 2020 Copa del Rey Final (played in 2021)) | 0 | — | | — | | 21 | 0 |
| Real Sociedad | 2020–21 | La Liga | 31 | 1 | 1 | 0 | 5 (Note: Appearance(s) in UEFA Europa League) | 0 | 1 (Note: Appearance(s) in Supercopa de España) | 0 | 38 | 1 |
| Real Sociedad | 2021–22 | La Liga | 17 | 0 | 4 | 0 | 3 | 0 | — | | 24 | 0 |
| Real Sociedad | 2022–23 | La Liga | 8 | 0 | 3 | 0 | 5 | 1 | — | | 16 | 1 |
| Real Sociedad | Total | | 71 | 1 | 16 | 0 | 13 | 1 | 1 | 0 | 101 | 2 |
| Alavés | 2023–24 | La Liga | 37 | 1 | 3 | 0 | — | | — | | 40 | 1 |
| Career total | | | 179 | 3 | 19 | 0 | 13 | 1 | 3 | 0 | 214 | 4 |

== Honours ==
Real Sociedad

- Copa del Rey: 2019–20
