= Willian José =

Brazilian footballer (born 1991)

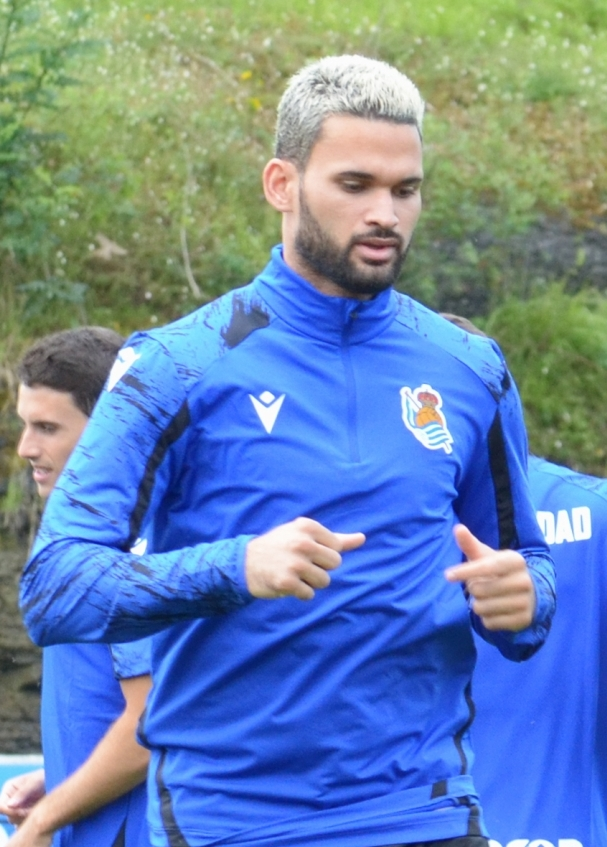
- Willian José with Real Sociedad in 2021

Personal information
- Full name: Willian José da Silva
- Date of birth: 23 November 1991 (age 34)
- Place of birth: Porto Calvo, Brazil
- Height: 1.89 m (6 ft 2 in)
- Position: Striker

Team information
- Current team: Bahia
- Number: 12

Youth career
- 2006–2008: CRB
- 2008–2009: Grêmio Barueri

Senior career*
Years	Team	Apps	(Gls)
2009–2010	Grêmio Barueri	29	(7)
2011–2016	Deportivo Maldonado	0	(0)
2011–2012	→ São Paulo (loan)	52	(14)
2013	→ Grêmio (loan)	6	(3)
2013	→ Santos (loan)	23	(5)
2014	→ Real Madrid B (loan)	16	(4)
2014	→ Real Madrid (loan)	1	(0)
2014–2015	→ Zaragoza (loan)	33	(7)
2015–2016	→ Las Palmas (loan)	30	(9)
2016–2022	Real Sociedad	143	(52)
2021	→ Wolverhampton Wanderers (loan)	17	(1)
2021–2022	→ Betis (loan)	32	(8)
2022–2024	Betis	61	(12)
2024–2025	Spartak Moscow	7	(1)
2025–	Bahia	60	(18)

International career
2011	Brazil U20	15	(11)
- * Club domestic league appearances and goals as of 21 July 2026

Willian José da Silva (born 23 November 1991), known as Willian José, is a Brazilian professional footballer who plays as a striker for Campeonato Brasileiro Série A club Bahia.

He began his career with 77 games and 12 goals in the Campeonato Brasileiro Série A for Grêmio Barueri, São Paulo and Santos, as well as representing Grêmio FBPA on loan in 2013.

Willian José spent most of his career in Spain, making 267 La Liga appearances and scoring 82 goals, mainly for Real Sociedad and Real Betis, winning a Copa del Rey with each in 2020 and 2022. He also represented Real Madrid and Las Palmas on loan in the division, and had a loan to Wolverhampton Wanderers of the Premier League in 2021.

== Club career ==
=== Grêmio Barueri ===
Born in Porto Calvo, Alagoas, Willian José started his career at local CRB's youth setup, before joining Grêmio Barueri in 2008, aged 17. On 1 August 2009 he made his first team – and Série A – debut, coming on as a late substitute in a 2–1 loss at Botafogo.

Willian José scored his first goal as a professional on 17 January of the following year, netting his side's only in a 1–1 draw at Sertãozinho for the Campeonato Paulista championship. He scored six further times during the campaign, which ended in relegation.

=== São Paulo ===
From 2011 to 2016, Willian José's contract was the property of Deportivo Maldonado of Uruguay, a team known for buying players to loan out. On 13 January 2011, Willian José joined São Paulo. He was mostly used as a backup to Luís Fabiano and Dagoberto in his first year, and despite the latter leaving for Internacional in 2012, he was still third-choice behind new signing Osvaldo.

=== Grêmio and Santos ===
On 13 December 2012, Willian José moved to Grêmio, but after appearing rarely he signed with Santos FC in May of the following year. He appeared in 28 matches during his only season at Peixe, scoring five goals.

=== Real Madrid ===
On 8 January 2014 Willian José moved abroad, signing a six-month deal with Real Madrid, being assigned to the reserves in Segunda División. After scoring a hat-trick in a 3–2 win at Recreativo de Huelva, he was called up for the main squad and was on the bench for the matches against Real Sociedad and UD Almería. He made his La Liga debut on 11 May, replacing compatriot Casemiro in a 2–0 loss at Celta de Vigo.

=== Zaragoza ===
Willian José signed a one-year deal with Real Zaragoza in the second level on 29 August 2014. He made his debut for the club on 7 September, replacing David Muñoz in a 4–1 loss at FC Barcelona B.

Willian José scored his first goal for the club on 12 October 2014, in a 3–3 away draw against CD Lugo. He also scored braces against UD Las Palmas (3–5 away defeat) and Girona FC (4–1 away win), finishing the campaign with ten goals as his side missed out promotion in the play-offs.

=== Las Palmas ===
On 30 July 2015, Willian José signed a one-year contract with Las Palmas, newly promoted to the top tier. His first goal in the category occurred on 12 December, the game's only in a home success against Real Betis.

On 25 January 2016, Willian José scored a brace in a 3–2 loss at Levante UD. On 20 February, he scored a first-half equalizer against league leaders FC Barcelona, but the hosts would eventually lose by 2–1. He also scored the equalizer against former club Real Madrid on 13 March, but the hosts again lost by 2–1.

=== Real Sociedad ===
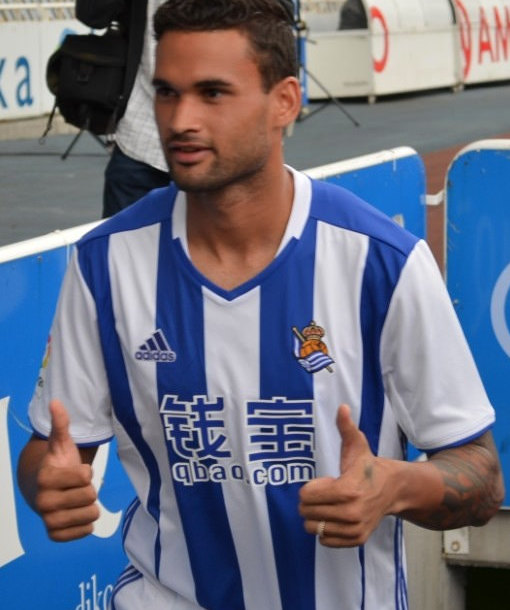
Willian José with Real Sociedad in 2016

On 31 July 2016, Willian José signed a five-year deal with fellow league team Real Sociedad. He made his debut on 21 August as the season began with a 3–0 home loss to Real Madrid, replacing David Concha after 55 minutes after starting on the bench due to fitness. In his next game on 9 September, he equalised in a 1–1 draw on Espanyol's visit to the Anoeta Stadium, and 12 days later he netted twice in a 4–1 win over former club Las Palmas. adding a further brace on 10 December in the first 25 minutes of a 3–2 win over Valencia.

Willian José scored four goals on 19 October 2017 in a 6–0 win away to FK Vardar of Macedonia in the Europa League group stage, though his team did not advance. The following 1 October, he extended his contract to 2024, with a release clause increased from €60 million to €70 million and Maldonado keeping 30% of his economic rights.

==== Loan to Wolverhampton Wanderers ====
On 23 January 2021, Willian José joined Premier League club Wolverhampton Wanderers for the remainder of the 2020–21 season, with the option to make the deal permanent at its conclusion. He made his first appearance for Wolves as a second-half substitute in a 0–0 draw with Chelsea at Stamford Bridge on 27 January, making a vital headed clearance of a goal-bound shot from Kai Havertz in the last minute of added time. He made his first start in the next game away to Crystal Palace three days later, and on 17 April he scored his only Wolves goal in a 1–0 home league win over Sheffield United, sealing the Blades' relegation to the EFL Championship.

=== Betis ===
On 26 August 2021, Willian José joined fellow La Liga club Real Betis on a season-long loan deal. The deal included the option to make the move permanent until 2025 for a fee of €8.5 million. He made his debut on 13 September in a 2–1 win at fellow Andalusians Granada, as a half-time substitute for Borja Iglesias; six days later he started and scored in the first five minutes of a 2–2 home draw with Espanyol. He followed this with a late goal from the bench in a 3–1 win at Osasuna, and both goals in a victory against Getafe at the Estadio Benito Villamarín. Over the season, he competed with Iglesias for the position of manager Manuel Pellegrini's starting centre-forward. In the team's victorious Copa del Rey campaign, he scored a penalty in a 4–0 win on his return to Real Sociedad in the quarter-final, and was an extra-time substitute in the final win over Valencia, scoring the first attempt in the penalty shootout.

In 2022–23, Willian José struggled for game time behind Sergio Canales and Iglesias. He returned to prominence in the following season, coming on as a half-time substitute for Iglesias in the opening game away to Villarreal and scoring the winning goal of a 2–1 victory in the last minute. On 8 October, away to Alavés, he came off the bench late in the 1–1 draw and was sent off in added time for kicking out at Aleksandar Sedlar as he got up from the floor. He scored four goals on 1 November in a 12–1 win at sixth-tier Hernán Cortés in the first round of the Copa del Rey; the result was the joint-second biggest win in the competition's history, behind Getafe's 12–0 win against Tardienta on the same day. In the 2023–24 season, he became the top scorer for his club in La Liga by scoring 10 goals.

=== Spartak Moscow ===
On 1 July 2024, Willian José signed a two-year contract with Russian Premier League club Spartak Moscow. On 14 January 2025, he left Spartak by mutual consent.

=== Bahia ===
On 14 January 2025, Willian José joined Bahia on a two-year deal.

== International career ==
In 2011, Willian José was a member of both the FIFA U-20 World Cup and South American Youth Championship winning squads with Brazil, scoring twice in the former and thrice in the latter.

On 12 March 2018, he received his first call-up for the senior team for two friendly matches against Russia and Germany, but he didn't play either one.

== Career statistics ==
As of match played 21 July 2026

Appearances and goals by club, season and competition
Club	Season	League			State league (Note: Includes Campeonato Paulista, Campeonato Gaúcho, Campeonato Baiano)		National cup (Note: Includes Copa do Brasil, Copa del Rey, FA Cup, Russian Cup)		Continental		Other		Total	
Club	Season	Division	Apps	Goals	Apps	Goals	Apps	Goals	Apps	Goals	Apps	Goals	Apps	Goals
Grêmio Barueri	2009	Série A	7	0	0	0	0	0	—		—		7	0
Grêmio Barueri	2010	Série A	19	6	3	1	0	0	2 (Note: Appearances in Copa Sudamericana)	0	—		24	7
Grêmio Barueri	Subtotal		26	6	3	1	0	0	2	0	—		31	7
São Paulo (loan)	2011	Série A	9	0	10	1	3	0	0	0	—		22	1
São Paulo (loan)	2012	Série A	19	1	14	11	4	0	7	3	—		44	15
São Paulo (loan)	Total		28	1	24	12	7	0	7	3	—		66	16
Grêmio (loan)	2013	Série A	0	0	6	3	0	0	3 (Note: Appearances in Copa Libertadores)	0	—		9	3
Santos (loan)	2013	Série A	23	5	—		2	0	—		—		25	5
Real Madrid B (loan)	2013–14	Segunda División	16	4	—		—		—		—		16	4
Real Madrid (loan)	2013–14	La Liga	1	0	—		0	0	—		—		1	0
Zaragoza (loan)	2014–15	Segunda División	33	7	—		1	0	—		4 (Note: Appearances in Segunda División play-offs)	3	38	10
Las Palmas (loan)	2015–16	La Liga	30	9	—		4	1	—		—		34	10
Real Sociedad	2016–17	La Liga	28	12	—		6	2	—		—		34	14
Real Sociedad	2017–18	La Liga	34	15	—		0	0	6 (Note: Appearances in UEFA Europa League)	5	—		40	20
Real Sociedad	2018–19	La Liga	31	11	—		3	0	—		—		34	11
Real Sociedad	2019–20	La Liga	37	11	—		4	0	—		—		41	11
Real Sociedad	2020–21	La Liga	14	3	—		1	2	6	1	1 (Note: Appearance in Supercopa de España)	0	22	6
Real Sociedad	Total		144	52	—		14	4	12	6	1	0	171	62
Wolverhampton Wanderers (loan)	2020–21	Premier League	17	1	—		1	0	—		—		18	1
Real Betis (loan)	2021–22	La Liga	32	8 (Note: Does not include the first goal scored in 2–2 draw against Espanyol on 19 September 2021; La Liga's official website attributes the goal to Adrià Pedrosa as an own goal, while other sites such as BDFutbol attribute it to Willian.)	—		4	1	8	1	—		44	10
Real Betis	2022–23	La Liga	28	2	—		2	1	8	2	1	0	39	5
Real Betis	2023–24	La Liga	33	10	—		3	4	7 (Note: Five appearances in UEFA Europa League, two appearances in UEFA Europa Conference League)	0	—		43	14
Real Betis	Betis total		93	20	—		9	6	23	3	1	0	126	29
Spartak Moscow	2024–25	Russian Premier League	7	0	—		6	1	—		—		13	1
Bahia	2025	Série A	33	11	5	2	5	3	11 (Note: Ten appearances and two goals in Copa Libertadores, one appearance in Copa Sudamericana)	2	7 (Note: Appearances in Copa do Nordeste)	2	61	20
Bahia	2026	Série A	18	3	4	2	1	1	2	2	—		25	8
Bahia	Total		51	14	9	4	6	4	13	4	7	2	86	28
Career total			469	119	42	20	50	16	60	16	13	5	634	176

== Honours ==
São Paulo

- Copa Sudamericana: 2012

Real Madrid

- Copa del Rey: 2013–14

Real Sociedad

- Copa del Rey: 2019–20

Real Betis

- Copa del Rey: 2021–22

Bahia

- Campeonato Baiano: 2025, 2026
- Copa do Nordeste: 2025

Brazil U20

- FIFA U-20 World Cup: 2011
- South American Youth Championship: 2011
