= Mikel Merino =

Spanish footballer (born 1996)

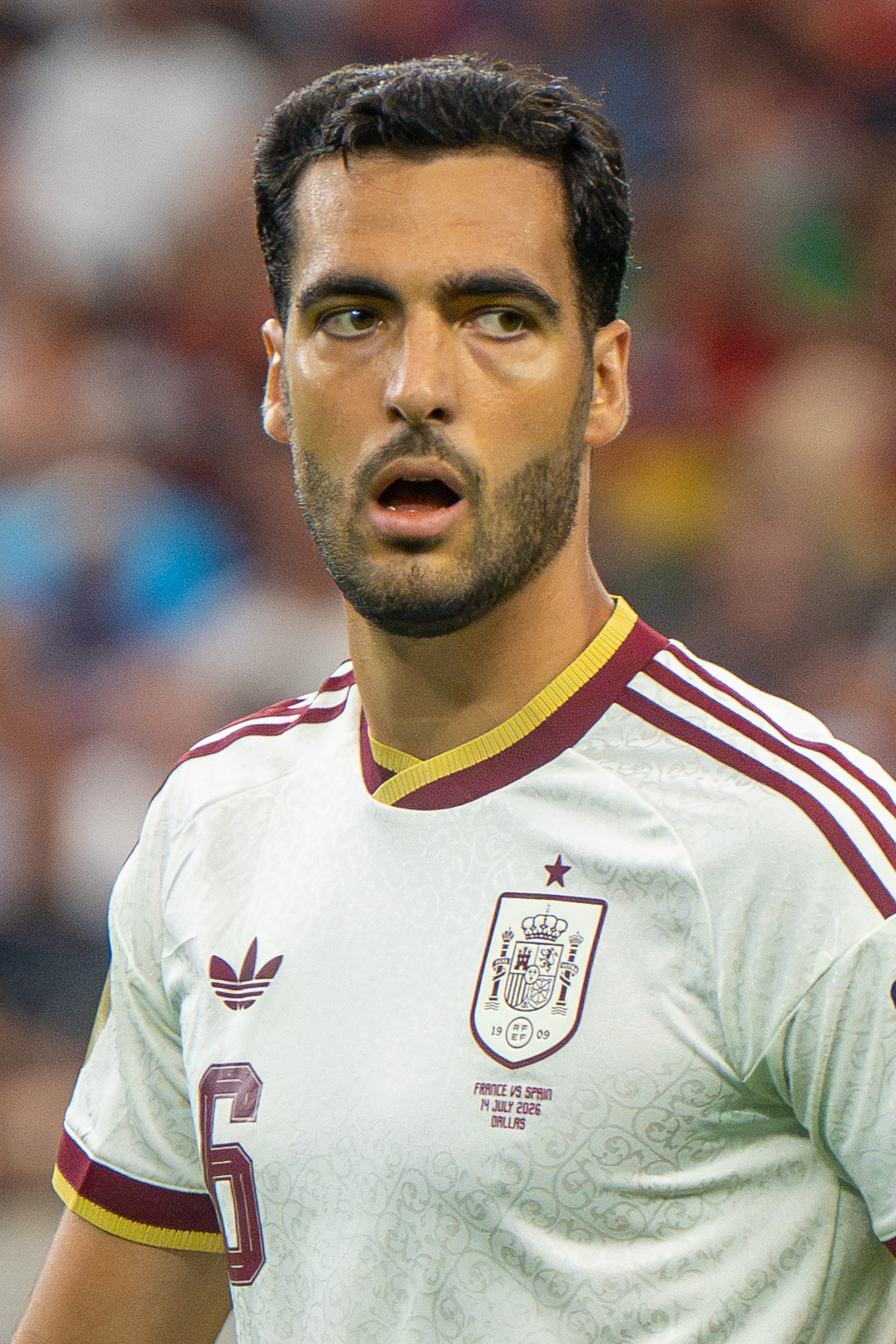
- Merino with Spain in 2026

Personal information
- Full name: Mikel Merino Zazón
- Date of birth: 22 June 1996 (age 30)
- Place of birth: Pamplona, Spain
- Height: 1.89 m (6 ft 2 in)
- Positions: Midfielder; striker

Team information
- Current team: Arsenal
- Number: 23

Youth career
- Amigó
- Osasuna

Senior career*
Years	Team	Apps	(Gls)
2014	Osasuna B	5	(0)
2014–2016	Osasuna	63	(5)
2016–2017	Borussia Dortmund	8	(0)
2017	→ Newcastle United (loan)	7	(0)
2017–2018	Newcastle United	17	(1)
2018–2024	Real Sociedad	190	(20)
2024–	Arsenal	61	(11)

International career^{‡}
2014–2015	Spain U19	12	(1)
2016–2019	Spain U21	20	(4)
2021	Spain U23	6	(1)
2020–	Spain	57	(15)
Medal record
Men's football
Representing Spain
FIFA World Cup
Winner	2026 Canada–Mexico–US
UEFA European Championship
Winner	2024 Germany
UEFA Nations League
Winner	2023 Netherlands
Runner-up	2021 Italy
Runner-up	2025 Germany
Olympic Games
Silver medal – second place	2020 Tokyo
UEFA European Under-21 Championship
Winner	2019 Italy-San Marino
Runner-up	2017 Poland
UEFA European Under-19 Championship
Winner	2015 Greece
- * Club domestic league appearances and goals as of 19:41, 21 November 2026 (UTC) ‡ National team caps and goals as of 23:03, 15 November 2026 (UTC)

Mikel Merino Zazón (Spanish pronunciation: [ˈmikel meˈɾino]; born 22 June 1996) is a Spanish professional footballer who plays as a midfielder or striker for Premier League club Arsenal and the Spain national team.

He began his career with Osasuna, and had short spells at Borussia Dortmund and Newcastle United before signing for Real Sociedad in 2018, winning the 2019–20 Copa del Rey with the club while totalling 242 appearances and 27 goals. In August 2024, he joined Arsenal, winning the Premier League in his second season.

Merino represented Spain in two European Under-21 Championships, winning the 2019 edition. He made his senior debut in 2020, being selected for Euro 2024 and the 2026 World Cup and winning both tournaments.

== Club career ==
=== Osasuna ===
Born in Pamplona, Navarre, Merino began his career with Amigó, later moving to Osasuna. He made his senior debut with the reserves in the 2013–14 season, in the Tercera División.

On 23 August 2014, Merino made his first competitive appearance with the first team, starting in a 2–0 home win against Barcelona B in the Segunda División. He scored his first professional goal on 21 December, the winner in a 2–1 away victory over Las Palmas.

Merino was promoted to the main squad on 31 January 2015, being given the number 8 jersey. He was a regular starter in his first year, helping them to narrowly avoid relegation.

In the 2015–16 campaign, Merino scored four goals from 34 appearances as Osasuna finished sixth and reached the promotion play-offs. In that stage's first round, he netted a brace in a 3–1 home win against Gimnàstic de Tarragona, and added another goal in the second leg (3–2 victory).

=== Borussia Dortmund ===
On 15 February 2016, Merino signed a five-year deal with Bundesliga club Borussia Dortmund, which was made effective on 1 July. His first league appearance occurred on 14 October, when he played the full 90 minutes in a 1–1 home draw against Hertha BSC.

=== Newcastle United ===
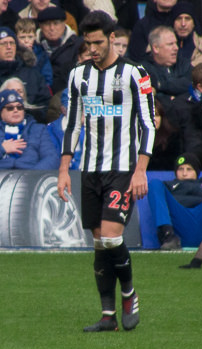
Merino playing for Newcastle United in 2017

In July 2017, Merino joined Newcastle United on a season-long loan; the Premier League side agreed to a clause obligating them to sign the player permanently, based on a number of appearances. On 13 October, this was invoked, and he agreed to a five-year contract.

Merino made 25 competitive appearances for the Magpies. He scored his only goal with a late header in a 1–0 win over Crystal Palace at St James' Park on 21 October 2017, also providing a sole assist.

=== Real Sociedad ===
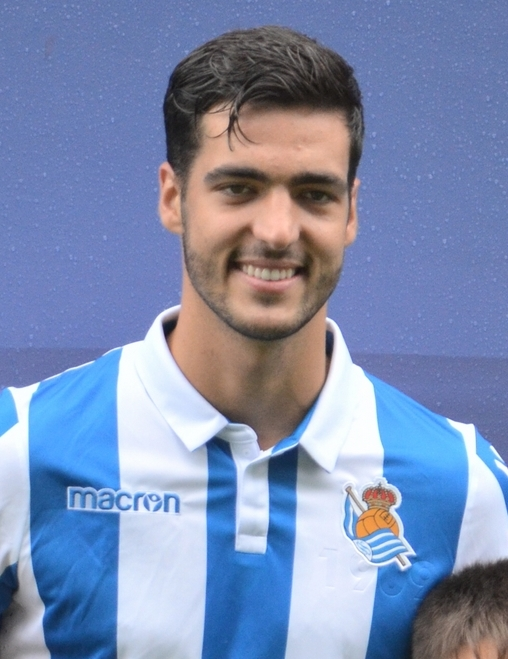
Merino with Real Sociedad in 2018

Merino returned to Spain on 12 July 2018, signing a five-year deal with Real Sociedad for an undisclosed fee reported to be €12 million. His first match in La Liga took place on 18 August when he played 59 minutes in a 2–1 win against hosts Villarreal, and his first goal on 21 September won the game at Huesca. Despite struggling initially to adapt to his new team, also dealing with some injury problems, he eventually became a starter, scoring four times in 32 fixtures in his first season.

On 7 March 2020, Merino wore the captain's armband for the first time in a 1–0 league defeat away to Barcelona. In July, he renewed his contract until 2025.

On 3 April 2021, Merino won his first title after playing the full 90 minutes of the 2020 Copa del Rey final – delayed due to the COVID-19 pandemic – against Athletic Bilbao, assisting Portu who was brought down in the box at the hour mark; Mikel Oyarzabal converted from the spot for the only goal at the Estadio de La Cartuja, and Merino was named player of the match.

In the 2023–24 campaign, Merino won the most duels for possession in Europe's top leagues at 326.

=== Arsenal ===
Merino in action for Arsenal in 2026

Merino returned to the English top division on 27 August 2024, signing a four-year deal at Arsenal for a reported fee of £31.6m. In his first training session, he fractured his shoulder in a collision with Gabriel Magalhães and was ruled out for several weeks. He featured in his first match on 1 October, as a substitute in the 2–0 home win against Paris Saint-Germain in the league phase of the UEFA Champions League. He scored his first league goal 26 days later, heading home from a free kick in a 2–2 home draw with Liverpool.

On 15 February 2025, Merino replaced Raheem Sterling in the 69th minute of the league fixture at Leicester City; as the habitual starter at centre-forward, Kai Havertz, had suffered a hamstring injury in training a week earlier, he was slotted into Havertz's position, going on to score both goals in the 2–0 victory. On 8 April, having again featured as a striker, he closed the 3–0 defeat of Real Madrid at Emirates Stadium in the Champions League quarter-finals' first leg. In his first season, he was regularly deployed in both positions.

On 28 September 2025, Merino scored his first goal of the new campaign in a 2–1 away win over his former employers Newcastle, coming off the bench to spark a late comeback in the final ten minutes. With summer signing Viktor Gyökeres out with a hamstring injury, he assumed his makeshift striker role once again in late November matches against Sunderland, Tottenham Hotspur, Bayern Munich and Chelsea; he netted four times in the league for the champions and six in all competitions, but missed four months after suffering a foot fracture during a 3–2 home loss to Manchester United.

== International career ==
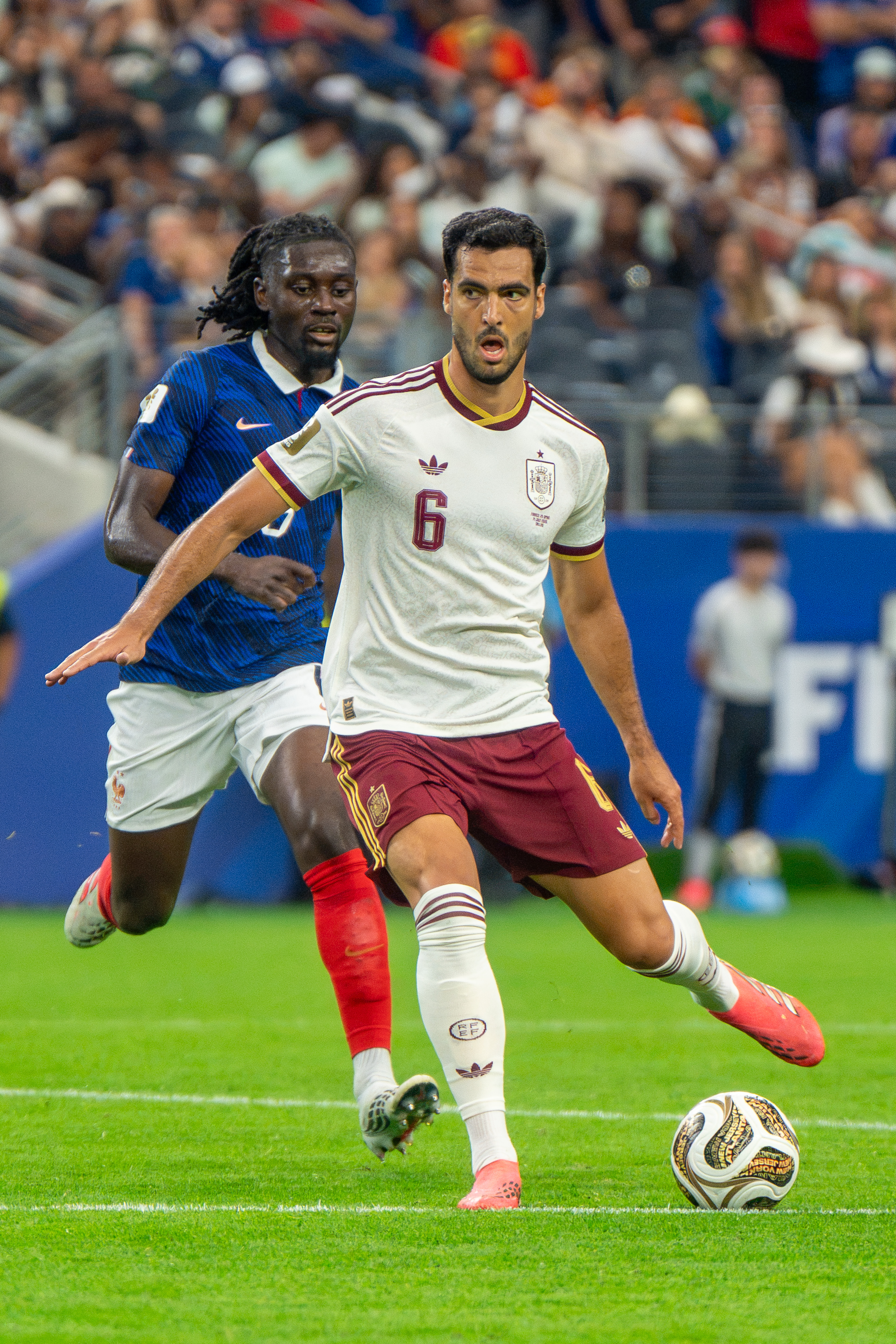
Merino playing for Spain at the 2026 FIFA World Cup

Merino was part of the Spain under-19 team which won the 2015 UEFA European Championship in Greece. He scored their first goal of the tournament, opening a 3–0 win over holders Germany at the AEL FC Arena in Larissa.

On 20 August 2020, Merino received his first call up to the senior side, for the initial two matches of the 2020–21 UEFA Nations League against Germany and Ukraine. He earned his first cap against the former on 3 September by replacing Sergio Busquets early into the second half of a 1–1 draw. He scored his first goal on 12 September 2023, the second in an eventual 6–0 rout of Cyprus in a qualifier for UEFA Euro 2024 held in Granada.

Merino was included in the squad for the Euro 2024 finals. In the quarter-final against Germany in Stuttgart, he scored a header from a cross by Dani Olmo in the 119th minute to secure his nation a spot in the semi-finals with a 2–1 win; his celebration after the goal (running around the corner flag) mirrored that of his father after he had done the same for Osasuna in a UEFA Cup fixture at the same stadium in 1991. He also featured in Spain's win in the final where they defeated England 2–1, achieving a continental record of four European championships, and in the process became one of 12 players who won both youth and senior Euro titles, alongside his teammates Nacho, Ferran Torres, Álvaro Morata and Rodri.

On 7 September 2025, Merino scored his first international hat-trick, in a 6–0 away victory over Turkey in the 2026 FIFA World Cup qualifiers. On 14 October, in the same stage, he reached ten goals for his country by netting a brace in the 4–0 defeat of Bulgaria in Valladolid.

Merino was named in Spain's squad for the 2026 World Cup finals. On 6 July, he scored the winning goal in stoppage time of a 1–0 win over Portugal in the round of 16. Four days later, again as a late substitute, he repeated the feat in the 2–1 quarter-final victory against Belgium.

== Style of play ==
Merino is a versatile left-footed midfielder who has played in several positions throughout his career, including centre-back during his time at Borussia Dortmund, defensive midfielder at Newcastle United and Real Sociedad and primarily as a box-to-box number eight. He has also featured as an attacking midfielder, being later deployed as a makeshift striker for Arsenal and Spain.

Known for his physicality, passing range, intelligence and ability to arrive late in the box, Merino combines defensive aggression with progressive passing and creative play. He is particularly effective at breaking lines with through balls, winning aerial duels and supporting attacks through well-timed forward runs.

== Personal life ==
Merino's father, Ángel Miguel, was also a footballer. His career was also associated with Osasuna, as both a player and manager.

On 11 April 2017, Merino survived the bombing of Borussia Dortmund's team bus. Shrapnel hit the headrest of his usual seat, but he had moved to the front row to stretch his legs.

On 1 June 2024, Merino married model Lola Liberal in Pamplona.

== Career statistics ==
=== Club ===
As of match played 21 November 2026

Appearances and goals by club, season and competition
Club	Season	League			National cup (Note: Includes DFB-Pokal, FA Cup, Copa del Rey)		League cup (Note: Includes EFL Cup)		Europe		Other		Total	
Club	Season	Division	Apps	Goals	Apps	Goals	Apps	Goals	Apps	Goals	Apps	Goals	Apps	Goals
Osasuna B	2013–14	Tercera División	5	0	—		—		—		—		5	0
Osasuna	2014–15	Segunda División	29	1	0	0	—		—		—		29	1
Osasuna	2015–16	Segunda División	34	4	0	0	—		—		4 (Note: Appearances in Segunda División play-offs)	3	38	7
Osasuna	Total		63	5	0	0	—		—		4	3	67	8
Borussia Dortmund	2016–17	Bundesliga	8	0	1	0	—		0	0	0	0	9	0
Newcastle United (loan)	2017–18	Premier League	7	0	0	0	0	0	—		—		7	0
Newcastle United	2017–18	Premier League	17	1	1	0	—		—		—		18	1
Newcastle United	Newcastle total		24	1	1	0	0	0	—		—		25	1
Real Sociedad	2018–19	La Liga	29	3	3	1	—		—		—		32	4
Real Sociedad	2019–20	La Liga	36	5	7 (Note: Includes appearance in 2020 Copa del Rey final (played in 2021))	1	—		—		—		43	6
Real Sociedad	2020–21	La Liga	26	2	1	0	—		8 (Note: Appearances in UEFA Europa League)	0	1 (Note: Appearance in Supercopa de España)	0	36	2
Real Sociedad	2021–22	La Liga	34	3	3	0	—		6	1	—		43	4
Real Sociedad	2022–23	La Liga	33	2	3	1	—		7	0	—		43	3
Real Sociedad	2023–24	La Liga	32	5	6	1	—		7 (Note: Appearances in UEFA Champions League)	2	—		45	8
Real Sociedad	Total		190	20	23	4	—		28	3	1	0	242	27
Arsenal	2024–25	Premier League	28	7	1	0	3	0	12	2	—		44	9
Arsenal	2025–26	Premier League	22	4	1	0	4	0	7	2	—		34	6
Arsenal	2026–27	Premier League	11	0	0	0	1	1	4	0	0	0	16	1
Arsenal	Total		61	11	2	0	8	1	23	4	0	0	94	16
Career total			351	37	27	4	8	1	51	7	5	3	442	52

=== International ===
As of match played 15 November 2026

Appearances and goals by national team and year
National team	Year	Apps	Goals
Spain	2020	6	0
Spain	2021	5	0
Spain	2022	0	0
Spain	2023	8	1
Spain	2024	12	1
Spain	2025	10	8
Spain	2026	16	5
Total		57	15

As of match played 6 October 2026
Spain score listed first, score column indicates score after each Merino goal.

List of international goals scored by Mikel Merino
No.	Date	Venue	Cap	Opponent	Score	Result	Competition
1	12 September 2023	Nuevo Estadio de Los Cármenes, Granada, Spain	17	Cyprus	2–0	6–0	UEFA Euro 2024 qualifying
2	5 July 2024	MHPArena, Stuttgart, Germany	26	Germany	2–1	2–1 (a.e.t.)	UEFA Euro 2024
3	20 March 2025	De Kuip, Rotterdam, Netherlands	32	Netherlands	2–2	2–2	2024–25 UEFA Nations League A
4	5 June 2025	MHPArena, Stuttgart, Germany	34	France	2–0	5–4	2025 UEFA Nations League Finals
5	4 September 2025	Vasil Levski National Stadium, Sofia, Bulgaria	36	Bulgaria	3–0	3–0	2026 FIFA World Cup qualification
6	7 September 2025	Konya Metropolitan Municipality Stadium, Konya, Turkey	37	Turkey	2–0	6–0	2026 FIFA World Cup qualification
7	7 September 2025	Konya Metropolitan Municipality Stadium, Konya, Turkey	37	Turkey	3–0	6–0	2026 FIFA World Cup qualification
8	7 September 2025	Konya Metropolitan Municipality Stadium, Konya, Turkey	37	Turkey	5–0	6–0	2026 FIFA World Cup qualification
9	14 October 2025	José Zorrilla Stadium, Valladolid, Spain	39	Bulgaria	1–0	4–0	2026 FIFA World Cup qualification
10	14 October 2025	José Zorrilla Stadium, Valladolid, Spain	39	Bulgaria	2–0	4–0	2026 FIFA World Cup qualification
11	6 July 2026	AT&T Stadium, Arlington, United States	48	Portugal	1–0	1–0	2026 FIFA World Cup
12	10 July 2026	SoFi Stadium, Inglewood, United States	49	Belgium	2–1	2–1	2026 FIFA World Cup
13	3 October 2026	Estadio Carlos Tartiere, Oviedo, Spain	54	Czech Republic	3–1	3–1	2026–27 UEFA Nations League A
14	6 October 2026	Stadion Poljud, Split, Croatia	55	Croatia	1–1	2–1	2026–27 UEFA Nations League A
15	6 October 2026	Stadion Poljud, Split, Croatia	55	Croatia	2–1	2–1	2026–27 UEFA Nations League A

== Honours ==
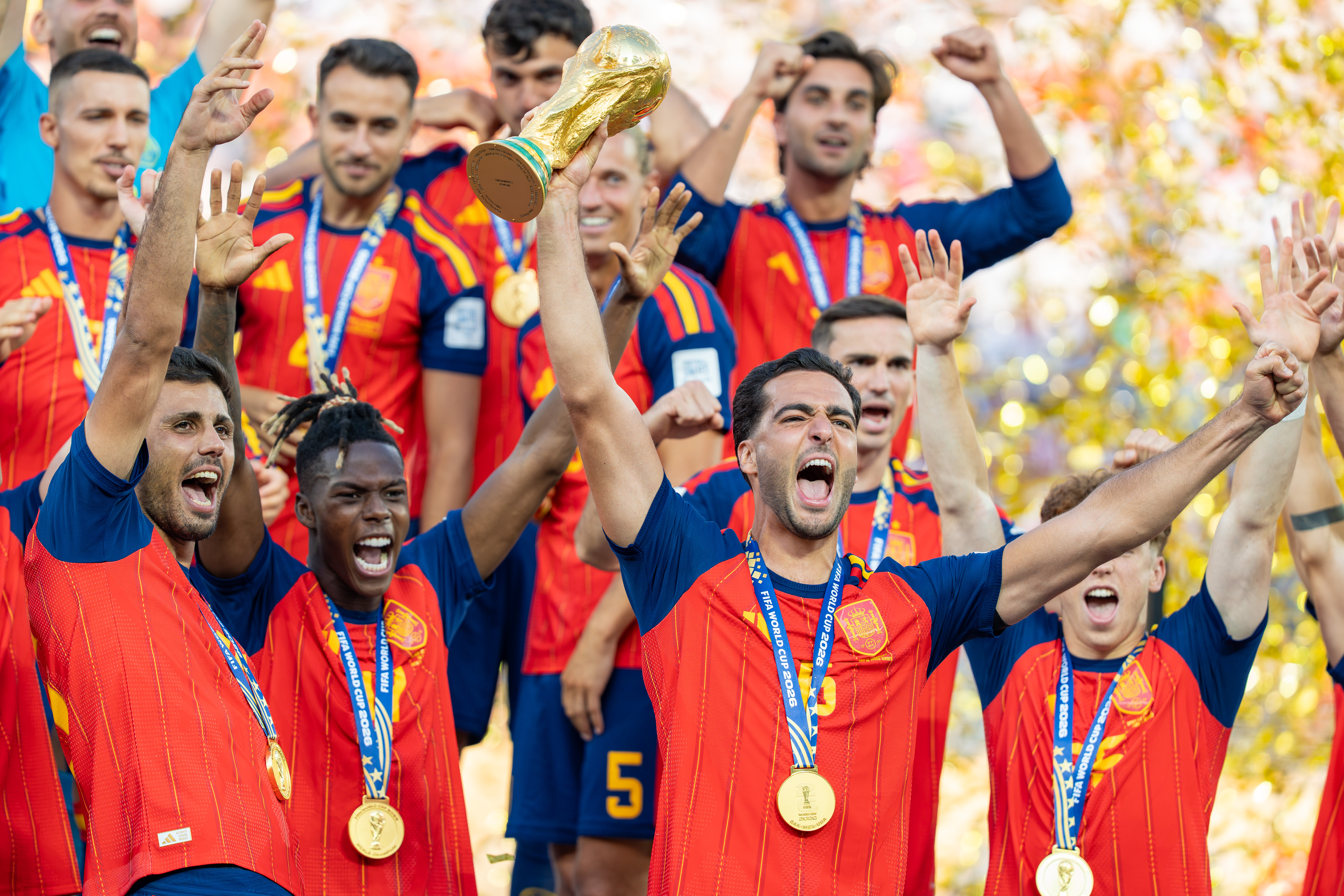
Merino holding the FIFA World Cup Trophy after Spain won the 2026 final

Borussia Dortmund

- DFB-Pokal: 2016–17

Real Sociedad

- Copa del Rey: 2019–20

Arsenal

- Premier League: 2025–26
- FA Community Shield: 2026
- UEFA Champions League runner-up: 2025–26

Spain U19

- UEFA European Under-19 Championship: 2015

Spain U21

- UEFA European Under-21 Championship: 2019; runner-up: 2017

Spain Olympic

- Summer Olympics silver medal: 2020

Spain

- FIFA World Cup: 2026
- UEFA European Championship: 2024
- UEFA Nations League: 2022–23; runner-up: 2020–21, 2024–25

Individual

- La Liga Team of the Season: 2022–23
- La Liga Play of the Month: March 2024 (with Mikel Oyarzabal)
- Segunda División Player of the Month: June 2016
