= Aihen Muñoz =

Spanish footballer (born 1997)

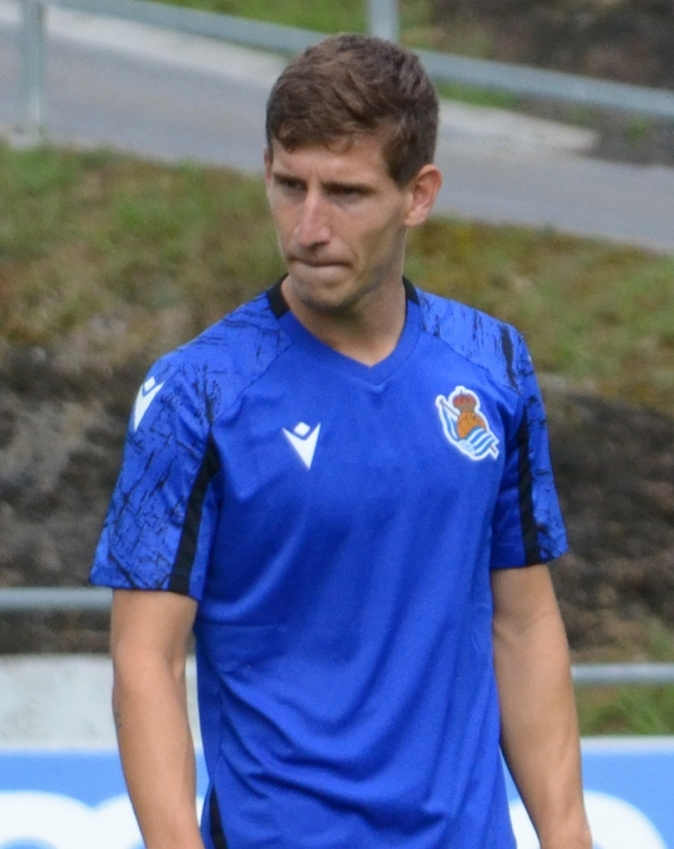
- Muñoz training with Real Sociedad in 2021

Personal information
- Full name: Aihen Muñoz Capellán
- Date of birth: 16 August 1997 (age 29)
- Place of birth: Etxauri, Spain
- Height: 1.75 m (5 ft 9 in)
- Positions: Left-back; left winger

Team information
- Current team: Real Sociedad
- Number: 3

Youth career
- Real Sociedad

Senior career*
Years	Team	Apps	(Gls)
2015–2017	Real Sociedad C	42	(4)
2017–2019	Real Sociedad B	41	(0)
2019–	Real Sociedad	151	(0)

International career^{‡}
2019–	Basque Country	4	(0)
- * Club domestic league appearances and goals as of 18 October 2026 (UTC) ‡ National team caps and goals as of 16 November 2026 (UTC)

Aihen Muñoz Capellán (born 16 August 1997) is a Spanish professional footballer who plays for Real Sociedad. Mainly a left-back, he can also play as a left winger.

== Club career ==
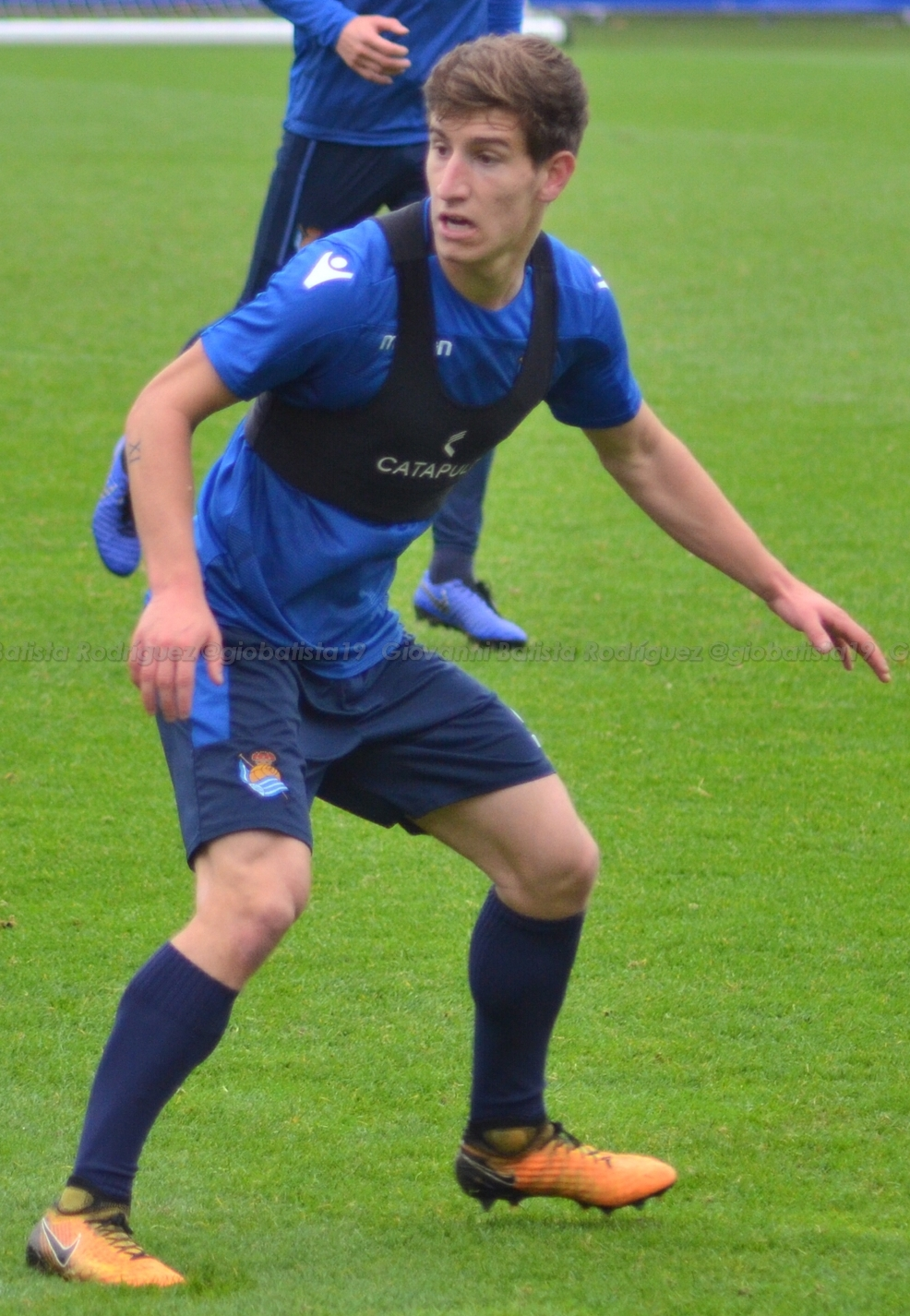
Muñoz training with Real Sociedad in 2018

Born in Etxauri, Navarre, Muñoz was a Real Sociedad youth graduate. Promoted to farm team CD Berio FT in July 2015, he made his senior debut during the campaign, in Tercera División.

For the 2017–18 season, Muñoz was promoted to the reserves in Segunda División B. He made his professional – and La Liga – debut on 6 January 2019, starting in a 2–0 away win against Real Madrid.

On 23 April 2019, Muñoz renewed his contract until 2022, and was definitely promoted to the main squad on 9 June.

== International career ==
He made his debut for the unofficial Basque Country national team in May 2019, in a 0–0 draw away to Panama for which a small, youthful and inexperienced squad was selected.

== Career statistics ==
=== Club ===
As of match played 18 October 2026

Appearances and goals by club, season and competition
Club	Season	League			National cup		Europe		Other		Total	
Club	Season	Division	Apps	Goals	Apps	Goals	Apps	Goals	Apps	Goals	Apps	Goals
Real Sociedad B	2017–18	Segunda División B	24	0	—		—		—		24	0
Real Sociedad B	2018–19	Segunda División B	17	0	—		—		—		17	0
Real Sociedad B	Total		41	0	0	0	0	0	0	0	41	0
Real Sociedad	2018–19	La Liga	11	0	—		—		—		11	0
Real Sociedad	2019–20	La Liga	15	0	5	0	—		—		20	0
Real Sociedad	2020–21	La Liga	16	0	1	0	2 (Note: Appearance(s) in UEFA Europa League)	0	—		19	0
Real Sociedad	2021–22	La Liga	20	0	3	1	8	0	—		31	1
Real Sociedad	2022–23	La Liga	23	0	3	0	1	0	—		27	0
Real Sociedad	2023–24	La Liga	21	0	2	0	6 (Note: Appearances in UEFA Champions League)	0	—		29	0
Real Sociedad	2024–25	La Liga	21	0	6	0	8	0	—		35	0
Real Sociedad	2025–26	La Liga	21	0	6	0	—		—		27	0
Real Sociedad	2026–27	La Liga	3	0	0	0	0	0	0	0	3	0
Real Sociedad	Total		151	0	26	1	25	0	0	0	202	1
Career total			192	0	26	1	25	0	0	0	243	1

== Honours ==
Real Sociedad

- Copa del Rey: 2019–20, 2025–26
