= 2020–21 Real Sociedad season =

Real Sociedad
2020–21 season
- President: Jokin Aperribay
- Head coach: Imanol Alguacil
- Stadium: Anoeta Stadium
- La Liga: 5th
- Copa del Rey: Round of 16
- Supercopa de España: Semi-finals
- UEFA Europa League: Round of 32
- Top goalscorer: League: Alexander Isak (17); All: Alexander Isak (17)
- Biggest win: Real Sociedad 4–0 Alavés
- Biggest defeat: Real Sociedad 1–6 Barcelona
Home colours	Away colours	Third colours

The 2020–21 season was the 111th season in the existence of Real Sociedad and the club's 11th consecutive season in the top flight of Spanish football. In addition to the domestic league, Real Sociedad participated in this season's editions of the Copa del Rey, the Supercopa de España, and also participated in the UEFA Europa League. The season covered the period from 20 July 2020 to 30 June 2021, with the late start to the season due to the COVID-19 pandemic in Spain.

This season was the first since 2007–08 without fellow centre-back David Zurutuza who announced his retirement from football after the previous campaign had concluded.

== Players ==
=== First-team squad ===
As of 24 January 2021

Note: Flags indicate national team as defined under FIFA eligibility rules; some limited exceptions apply. Players may hold more than one non-FIFA nationality.

No.	Pos.	Nation	Player
1	GK	ESP	Álex Remiro
2	DF	ESP	Joseba Zaldúa
4	MF	ESP	Asier Illarramendi (Captain)
5	MF	ESP	Igor Zubeldia
6	DF	ESP	Aritz Elustondo (3rd captain)
7	MF	ESP	Portu
8	MF	ESP	Mikel Merino
9	FW	ESP	Carlos Fernández
10	FW	ESP	Mikel Oyarzabal (vice-captain)
11	MF	BEL	Adnan Januzaj
12	DF	ESP	Aihen Muñoz
13	GK	ESP	Miguel Ángel Moyá
14	MF	ESP	Jon Guridi

No.	Pos.	Nation	Player
15	DF	FRA	Modibo Sagnan
16	MF	ESP	Ander Guevara
17	MF	ESP	Martín Merquelanz
18	DF	ESP	Andoni Gorosabel
19	FW	SWE	Alexander Isak
20	DF	ESP	Nacho Monreal
21	MF	ESP	David Silva
22	FW	ESP	Ander Barrenetxea
23	MF	ESP	Luca Sangalli
24	DF	FRA	Robin Le Normand
25	FW	ESP	Jon Bautista
28	MF	ESP	Roberto López
36	MF	ESP	Martín Zubimendi

=== Reserve team ===
Note: Flags indicate national team as defined under FIFA eligibility rules; some limited exceptions apply. Players may hold more than one non-FIFA nationality.

No.	Pos.	Nation	Player
26	DF	ESP	Jon Pacheco
29	MF	ESP	Robert Navarro
32	DF	FRA	Jérémy Blasco
33	DF	ESP	Aritz Arambarri

No.	Pos.	Nation	Player
34	GK	ESP	Gaizka Ayesa
35	FW	ESP	Julen Lobete
37	DF	ESP	Urko González de Zárate
—	DF	ESP	Álex Sola

=== Out on loan ===
Note: Flags indicate national team as defined under FIFA eligibility rules; some limited exceptions apply. Players may hold more than one non-FIFA nationality.

No.	Pos.	Nation	Player
—	GK	ESP	Andoni Zubiaurre (at Cultural Leonesa until 30 June 2021)
—	DF	POR	Kévin Rodrigues (at Eibar until 30 June 2021)

No.	Pos.	Nation	Player
—	MF	FRA	Naïs Djouahra (at Mirandés until 30 June 2021)
—	FW	BRA	Willian José (at Wolverhampton Wanderers until 30 June 2021)

== Transfers ==
=== In ===
Date	Player	From	Type	Fee	Ref
30 June 2020	(Spain) Jon Bautista	(Belgium) Eupen	Loan return		
30 June 2020	(Argentina) Gerónimo Rulli	(France) Montpellier	Loan return		
20 July 2020	(Portugal) Kévin Rodrigues	Leganés	Loan return		
21 July 2020	(Spain) Jon Guridi	Mirandés	Loan return		
21 July 2020	(Spain) Martín Merquelanz	Albacete	Loan return		
21 July 2020	(France) Modibo Sagnan	Mirandés	Loan return		
17 August 2020	(Spain) David Silva	(England) Manchester City	Transfer	Free	
24 January 2021	(Spain) Carlos Fernández	Sevilla	Transfer	€10M	

=== Out ===
Date	Player	To	Type	Fee	Ref
20 July 2020	(Norway) Martin Ødegaard	Real Madrid	Loan return		
20 July 2020	(Spain) David Zurutuza	Retired			
4 August 2020	(Spain) Raúl Navas	Osasuna	Buyout clause	€250K	
4 September 2020	(Argentina) Gerónimo Rulli	Villarreal	Transfer	€5M	
12 September 2020	(Portugal) Kévin Rodrigues	Eibar	Loan		
24 September 2020	(Spain) Diego Llorente	(England) Leeds United	Transfer	€20M	
30 September 2020	(France) Naïs Djouahra	Mirandés	Loan		
1 October 2020	(Spain) Andoni Zubiaurre	Cultural Leonesa	Loan		
23 January 2021	(Brazil) Willian José	(England) Wolverhampton Wanderers	Loan		

== Pre-season and friendlies ==
Win Draw Loss

22 August 2020 Friendly	Real Sociedad	3–1	UD Logroñés	Zubieta, Spain
19:00 CEST (UTC+2)	Willian José 4'; Portu 39' (pen.), 40'	Report	Andy 52' (pen.)	Stadium: Campo José Luis Orbegozo; Attendance: 0 Referee: Rezola Etxeberria

28 August 2020 Friendly	Rio Ave	Cancelled	Real Sociedad	Vila do Conde, Portugal
12:00 CEST (UTC+2)				Stadium: Estádio dos Arcos

29 August 2020 Friendly	Famalicão	Cancelled	Real Sociedad	Vila Nova de Famalicão, Portugal
18:00 CEST (UTC+2)				Stadium: Estádio Municipal 22 de Junho

29 August 2020 Friendly	Real Sociedad	2–2	Huesca	Zubieta, Spain
18:00 CEST (UTC+2)	Merino 47'; Bautista 88'	Report	Juan Carlos 33'; Mir 69' (pen.)	Stadium: Campo José Luis Orbegozo; Attendance: 0 Referee: Rezola Etxeberria

2 September 2020 Friendly	Villarreal	2–0	Real Sociedad	Villarreal, Spain
19:00 CEST (UTC+2)	Coquelin 2'; Alcácer 30' (pen.)	Report	Elustondo (yellow card) 45+2'	Stadium: Ciudad Deportiva; Attendance: 0 Referee: Iván Caparrós Hernández

5 September 2020 Friendly	Real Sociedad	2–2	Alavés	Zubieta, Spain
11:00 CEST (UTC+2)	Bautista 57' (pen.); Aldasoro 64'	Report	Pérez 7'; Joselu 75'	Stadium: Campo José Luis Orbegozo; Attendance: 0 Referee: Palencia Caballero

5 September 2020 EH Txapela	Real Sociedad	1–0	Osasuna	San Sebastián, Spain
19:00 CEST (UTC+2)	Willian José 32' (pen.)	Report	Herrera (yellow card) 30'; Roncaglia (yellow card) 73'	Stadium: Anoeta; Attendance: 0 Referee: Ibai Rezola Etxeberria

== Competitions ==
=== Overview ===
Competition	First match	Last match	Starting round	Final position	Record							
Competition	First match	Last match	Starting round	Final position	Pld	W	D	L	GF	GA	GD	Win %
La Liga	13 September 2020	22 May 2021	Matchday 1	5th	38	17	11	10	59	38	+21	44.74
Copa del Rey	20 January 2021	26 January 2021	Round of 32	Round of 16	2	1	0	1	3	3	+0	50.00
Supercopa de España	13 January 2021		Semi-finals	Semi-finals	1	0	1	0	1	1	+0	0.00
UEFA Europa League	22 October 2020	25 February 2021	Group stage	Round of 32	8	2	4	2	5	8	−3	25.00
Total					49	20	16	13	68	50	+18	40.82

Source: Soccerway

=== La Liga ===
==== League table ====
Pos	Team	Pld	W	D	L	GF	GA	GD	Pts	Qualification or relegation
3	Barcelona	38	24	7	7	85	38	+47	79	Qualification for the Champions League group stage
4	Sevilla	38	24	5	9	53	33	+20	77	Qualification for the Champions League group stage
5	Real Sociedad	38	17	11	10	59	38	+21	62	Qualification for the Europa League group stage (Note: Since the winners of the 2020–21 Copa del Rey, Barcelona, qualified for the 2021–22 UEFA Champions League based on league position, the spot awarded to the cup winners (Europa League group stage) was passed to the sixth-placed team, and the spot awarded to the sixth-placed team (2021–22 UEFA Europa Conference League play-off round) was passed to the seventh-placed team, Villarreal.)
6	Real Betis	38	17	10	11	50	50	0	61	Qualification for the Europa League group stage
7	Villarreal	38	15	13	10	60	44	+16	58	Qualification for the Champions League group stage (Note: Villarreal qualified for the 2021–22 UEFA Champions League by winning the 2020–21 UEFA Europa League. Based on their league position (7th), they would have received the spot above to enter the Europa Conference League play-off round. This spot was vacated without replacement as per UEFA regulations.)

Source: La Liga
Rules for classification: 1) Points; 2) Head-to-head points; 3) Head-to-head goal difference; 4) Goal difference; 5) Goals scored; 6) Fair-play points (Note: Head-to-head record is used only after all the matches between the teams in question have been played)

==== Results summary ====
Overall								Home						Away					
Pld	W	D	L	GF	GA	GD	Pts	W	D	L	GF	GA	GD	W	D	L	GF	GA	GD
38	17	11	10	59	38	+21	62	9	6	4	34	21	+13	8	5	6	25	17	+8

Source: La Liga

==== Results by round ====
Round	1	2	3	4	5	6	7	8	9	10	11	12	13	14	15	16	17	18	19	20	21	22	23	24	25	26	27	28	29	30	31	32	33	34	35	36	37	38
Ground	A	H	A	H	H	A	H	A	H	A	H	A	H	A	H	A	H	A	A	H	A	H	A	H	A	H	A	H	H	A	H	A	H	A	H	A	H	A
Result	D	D	W	L	W	W	W	W	W	W	D	D	D	L	L	W	D	L	L	D	D	W	W	W	D	W	L	L	D	D	W	W	L	L	W	L	W	W
Position	5	9	3	10	8	1	1	1	1	1	1	2	1	3	3	3	3	5	5	6	6	6	5	5	5	5	5	5	5	5	5	5	5	5	5	5	5	5

Source: La Liga
A = Away; H = Home; W = Win; D = Draw; L = Loss

==== Matches ====
The league fixtures were announced on 31 August 2020.

13 September 2020 1	Valladolid	1–1	Real Sociedad	Valladolid
16:00 CEST (UTC+2)	Míchel 39', (yellow card) 44'; Nacho (yellow card) 51'; Rubio (yellow card) 65'; Joaquín (yellow card) 69'	Report	López 60'; Elustondo (yellow card) 62'	Stadium: José Zorrilla; Attendance: 0 (Note: The match was played behind closed doors due to the COVID-19 pandemic in Spain.); Referee: Mario Melero López

20 September 2020 2	Real Sociedad	0–0	Real Madrid	San Sebastián
21:00 CEST (UTC+2)	Barrenetxea (yellow card) 24'; Muñoz (yellow card) 33'	Report	Mendy (yellow card) 29'; Carvajal (yellow card) 83'	Stadium: Anoeta; Attendance: 0 Referee: Juan Martínez Munuera

26 September 2020 3	Elche	0–3	Real Sociedad	Elche
18:30 CEST (UTC+2)	Mfulu (yellow card) 35'; Verdú (yellow card) 70'; Guti (yellow card) 87'	Report	Silva (yellow card) 43'; Portu 55'; Januzaj 77' (pen.); López 90+4'	Stadium: Estadio Manuel Martínez Valero; Attendance: 0 Referee: Isidro Diaz de Mera Escuderos

29 September 2020 4	Real Sociedad	0–1	Valencia	San Sebastián
19:00 CEST (UTC+2)	Zubimendi (yellow card) 35'	Report	Kondogbia (yellow card) 17'; Gómez (yellow card) 45+2', (goal) 75'; Wass (yellow card) 60'; Gayà (yellow card) 61'; Correia (yellow card) 87'	Stadium: Anoeta; Attendance: 0 Referee: Jorge Figueroa Vázquez

3 October 2020 5	Real Sociedad	3–0	Getafe	San Sebastián
18:30 CEST (UTC+2)	Oyarzabal 28' (pen.); Gorosabel (yellow card) 41'; Merino (yellow card) 71', (goal) 79'; Silva (yellow card) 73'; Portu 81'	Report	Suárez (yellow card) 45+1'; Hernández (yellow card) 56'; Etxeita (yellow card) 66'	Stadium: Anoeta; Attendance: 0 Referee: Antonio Mateu Lahoz

18 October 2020 6	Real Betis	0–3	Real Sociedad	Seville
21:00 CEST (UTC+2)	Sidnei (yellow card) 53'; Bartra (yellow card) 72'	Report	Portu 43'; Oyarzabal 74' (pen.); Isak (yellow card) 87'; Januzaj 88'	Stadium: Estadio Benito Villamarín; Attendance: 0 Referee: Xavier Estrada Fernández

25 October 2020 7	Real Sociedad	4–1	Huesca	San Sebastián
21:00 CET (UTC+1)	Elustondo (yellow card) 23'; Oyarzabal 35' (pen.), 54', (yellow card) 64'; Portu 68'; Isak 75'	Report	Mir 46'; Escriche (yellow card) 60'	Stadium: Anoeta; Attendance: 0 Referee: Isidro Díaz de Mera Escuderos

1 November 2020 8	Celta Vigo	1–4	Real Sociedad	Vigo
16:00 CET (UTC+1)	Fontán (yellow card) 47' (yellow-red card) 90+3'; Aspas 77' (pen.)	Report	Silva 24', (yellow card) 56'; Oyarzabal 34'; Guridi (yellow card) 38'; Willian José 54', 81'; Zubimendi (yellow card) 59'; Muñoz (yellow card) 64'; Le Normand (yellow card) 76'	Stadium: Balaídos; Attendance: 0 Referee: Adrián Cordero Vega

8 November 2020 9	Real Sociedad	2–0	Granada	San Sebastián
16:15 CET (UTC+1)	Merino (yellow card) 19'; Monreal 22'; Oyarzabal 27' (pen.); Willian José (penalty missed) 54'; Le Normand (red card) 86'; Silva (yellow card) 90+4'	Report	Barcia (yellow card) 80'; Machís (penalty missed) 90+5'	Stadium: Anoeta; Attendance: 0 Referee: Carlos del Cerro Grande

22 November 2020 10	Cádiz	0–1	Real Sociedad	Cádiz
16:15 CET (UTC+1)	Garrido (yellow card) 13'; Fali (yellow card) 17'	Report	Isak 66'; Guevara (yellow card) 88'	Stadium: Ramón de Carranza; Attendance: 0 Referee: Xavier Estrada Fernández

29 November 2020 11	Real Sociedad	1–1	Villarreal	San Sebastián
21:00 CET (UTC+1)	Elustondo (yellow card) 5'; Oyarzabal 33' (pen.); Le Normand (yellow card) 37'; Barrenetxea (yellow card) 53'; Muñoz (yellow card) 75'; Zubimendi (yellow card) 86'	Report	Gerard 6' (pen.); Torres (yellow card) 31'; Albiol (yellow card) 32'; Iborra (yellow card) 73'	Stadium: Anoeta; Attendance: 0 Referee: Jesús Gil Manzano

6 December 2020 12	Alavés	0–0	Real Sociedad	Vitoria-Gasteiz
21:00 CET (UTC+1)	Lejeune (yellow card) 42'; Battaglia (red card) 61'	Report		Stadium: Mendizorrotza; Attendance: 0 Referee: José Luis Munuera Montero

13 December 2020 13	Real Sociedad	1–1	Eibar	San Sebastián
14:00 CET (UTC+1)	Sagnan (yellow card) 14'; Barrenetxea 20'; Muñoz (yellow card) 40'; Zaldúa (yellow card) 84'; Zubeldia (yellow card) 88'	Report	Expósito (yellow card) 7'; Burgos (yellow card) 53'; Enrich 65'; Arbilla (yellow card) 80'	Stadium: Anoeta; Attendance: 0 Referee: Isidro Díaz de Mera

16 December 2020 19	Barcelona	2–1	Real Sociedad	Barcelona
21:00 CET (UTC+1)	Alba 31'; Busquets (yellow card) 41'; De Jong 43'; Trincão (yellow card) 88'; Aleñá (yellow card) 90+3'	Report	Januzaj (yellow card) 20'; Willian José 27'; Barrenetxea (yellow card) 58'; Le Normand (yellow card) 80'	Stadium: Camp Nou; Attendance: 0 Referee: José María Sánchez Martínez
Note: The match originally scheduled for 20 January 2021, but brought forward due to the teams involvement in the Supercopa de España.

19 December 2020 14	Levante	2–1	Real Sociedad	Valencia
18:30 CET (UTC+1)	Rochina (yellow card) 21'; Roger 28'; Vukčević (yellow card) 47'; De Frutos 87'	Report	Isak 22', (yellow card) 82'	Stadium: Ciutat de València; Attendance: 0 Referee: César Soto Grado

22 December 2020 15	Real Sociedad	0–2	Atlético Madrid	San Sebastián
19:45 CET (UTC+1)	Le Normand (yellow card) 29'; Elustondo (yellow card) 80'; Isak (yellow card) 86'	Report	Savić (yellow card) 16'; Hermoso (yellow card) 29', (goal) 49'; Saúl (yellow card) 66'; Llorente 74'	Stadium: Anoeta; Attendance: 0 Referee: Guillermo Cuadra Fernández

31 December 2020 16	Athletic Bilbao	0–1	Real Sociedad	Bilbao
14:00 CET (UTC+1)	Vencedor (yellow card) 23'; Berchiche (yellow card) 55'; Núñez (yellow card) 62'; Martínez (yellow card) 81'; Capa (yellow card) 84'	Report	Portu 5'; Guevara (yellow card) 8'; Barrenetxea (yellow card) 21'; Merino (yellow card) 39'; Zubeldia (yellow card) 67'	Stadium: San Mamés; Attendance: 0 Referee: José María Sánchez Martínez

3 January 2021 17	Real Sociedad	1–1	Osasuna	San Sebastián
18:30 CET (UTC+1)	Barrenetxea 46'; Zubeldia (yellow card) 76'	Report	Calleri 20'; Roncaglia (yellow card) 88'	Stadium: Anoeta; Attendance: 0 Referee: Valentín Pizarro Gómez

9 January 2021 18	Sevilla	3–2	Real Sociedad	Seville
14:00 CET (UTC+1)	En-Nesyri 4', 7', 46'	Report	Diego Carlos 5' (o.g.); Isak 14'; Muñoz (yellow card) 34'; Sagnan (yellow card) 39'; Guridi (yellow card) 43'	Stadium: Ramón Sánchez Pizjuán; Attendance: 0 Referee: Javier Alberola Rojas

23 January 2021 20	Real Sociedad	2–2	Real Betis	San Sebastián
18:30 CET (UTC+1)	Isak 48'; Oyarzabal 57'; Merino (yellow card) 69'; Zaldúa (yellow card) 86'	Report	Akouokou (yellow card) 51'; Canales 85'; Miranda (yellow card) 90+1'; Joaquín 90+2'	Stadium: Anoeta; Attendance: 0 Referee: César Soto Grado

30 January 2021 21	Villarreal	1–1	Real Sociedad	Villarreal
21:00 CET (UTC+1)	Parejo 3'; Capoue (yellow card) 70'	Report	Illarramendi (yellow card) 32'; Le Normand (yellow card) 49'; Guevara (yellow card) 59'; Isak 90+3'	Stadium: Estadio de la Cerámica; Attendance: 0 Referee: Isidro Díaz De Mera Escuderos

7 February 2021 22	Real Sociedad	4–1	Cádiz	San Sebastián
14:00 CET (UTC+1)	Oyarzabal 26' (pen.), 34'; Isak 54', 59'	Report	Jairo (yellow card) 38', (goal) 65'; Marcos Mauro (red card) 45+3'; Sobrino (yellow card) 90'	Stadium: Anoeta; Attendance: 0 Referee: Valentín Pizarro Gómez

14 February 2021 23	Getafe	0–1	Real Sociedad	Getafe
14:00 CET (UTC+1)	Chakla (yellow card) 43'; Hernández (yellow card) 71'; Portillo (yellow card) 77'	Report	Isak 30'; Portu (yellow card) 89'; Fernández (yellow card) 90+1'; Barrenetxea (yellow card) 90+2'	Stadium: Coliseum Alfonso Pérez; Attendance: 0 Referee: Pablo González Fuertes

21 February 2021 24	Real Sociedad	4–0	Alavés	San Sebastián
16:15 CET (UTC+1)	Isak 41', 49', 62'; Merino (yellow card) 51'; Illarramendi (yellow card) 54'; Portu 73'; Bautista (yellow card) 85'	Report	García (yellow card) 52'; Pina (yellow card) 61'	Stadium: Anoeta; Attendance: 0 Referee: José Luis Munuera Montero

1 March 2021 25	Real Madrid	1–1	Real Sociedad	Madrid
21:00 CET (UTC+1)	Vinícius 89'	Report	Portu 55'; Gorosabel (yellow card) 76'	Stadium: Alfredo Di Stéfano; Attendance: 0 Referee: Jesús Gil Manzano

7 March 2021 26	Real Sociedad	1–0	Levante	San Sebastián
18:30 CET (UTC+1)	Merino 10'; Oyarzabal (penalty missed) 22'	Report	Rochina (yellow card) 38'; Gómez (yellow card) 40'	Stadium: Anoeta; Attendance: 0 Referee: César Soto Grado

14 March 2021 27	Granada	1–0	Real Sociedad	Granada
16:15 CET (UTC+1)	Germán 51', (yellow card) 85'; Kenedy (yellow card) 81'	Report	Portu (yellow card) 85'; Guevara (yellow card) 88'; Bautista (yellow card) 90+5'	Stadium: Nuevo Los Cármenes; Attendance: 0 Referee: Pablo González Fuertes

21 March 2021 28	Real Sociedad	1–6	Barcelona	San Sebastián
21:00 CET (UTC+1)	Zubimendi (yellow card) 9'; Barrenetxea 77'; Zubeldia (yellow card) 79'; Fernández (yellow card) 90+4'	Report	Busquets (yellow card) 27'; Griezmann 37'; Dest 43', 53'; Messi 56', 89'; Dembélé 71'; Braithwaite (yellow card) 88'	Stadium: Anoeta; Attendance: 0 Referee: José Luis Munuera Montero

7 April 2021 29	Real Sociedad	1–1	Athletic Bilbao	San Sebastián
21:00 CEST (UTC+2)	Muñoz (yellow card) 12'; Zubeldia (yellow card) 38'; Zubimendi (yellow card) 84'; López 89'	Report	D. García (yellow card) 22'; Villalibre 85'	Stadium: Anoeta; Attendance: 0 Referee: José María Sánchez Martínez

11 April 2021 30	Valencia	2–2	Real Sociedad	Valencia
16:15 CEST (UTC+2)	Soler (penalty missed) 29'; Cheryshev (yellow card) 42'; Gabriel (yellow card) 47', (goal) 73'; Wass 60' (pen.), (yellow card) 77'; Musah (yellow card) 68'; Gómez (yellow card) 78' (yellow-red card) 80'	Report	De Zárate (yellow card) 7'; Guevara 33'; Portu (yellow card) 45'; Isak 45', (yellow card) 82'; Fernández (yellow card) 58'; Monreal (yellow card) 66'	Stadium: Mestalla; Attendance: 0 Referee: Valentín Pizarro Gómez

18 April 2021 33	Real Sociedad	1–2	Sevilla	San Sebastián
14:00 CEST (UTC+2)	Fernández 5', (yellow card) 59'; Isak (yellow card) 63'; Barrenetxea (yellow card) 74'	Report	Fernando 22'; En-Nesyri 24'; Diego Carlos (yellow card) 51'; Jordán (yellow card) 71'	Stadium: Anoeta; Attendance: 0 Referee: Santiago Jaime Latre
Note: The match was originally scheduled for 28 April 2021, but was brought forward by La Liga.

22 April 2021 31	Real Sociedad	2–1	Celta Vigo	San Sebastián
21:00 CEST (UTC+2)	Elustondo (yellow card) 15'; Portu 25'; Isak (penalty missed) 29'; Januzaj 39' (pen.); Sagnan (yellow card) 90+1'; Fernández (yellow card) 90+2'; Barrenetxea (yellow card) 90+6'	Report	Mallo 22', (yellow card) 90+3'; Murillo (yellow card) 38'; Nolito (yellow card) 62'; Suárez (yellow card) 90+3'; Aspas (yellow card) 90+6'	Stadium: Anoeta; Attendance: 0 Referee: Jesús Gil Manzano

26 April 2021 32	Eibar	0–1	Real Sociedad	Eibar
21:00 CEST (UTC+2)	Recio (yellow card) 4'; Oliveira (yellow card) 31'; José Ángel (yellow card) 43'; Gil (yellow card) 43'; Muto (yellow card) 80'	Report	Isak 26'; Zubimendi (yellow card) 81'	Stadium: Ipurua; Attendance: 0 Referee: Jorge Figueroa Vázquez

1 May 2021 34	Huesca	1–0	Real Sociedad	Huesca
18:30 CEST (UTC+2)	Seoane (yellow card) 76'; Sandro 86'; Pulido (yellow card) 89'	Report	Gorosabel (yellow card) 52'; Zaldúa (yellow card) 86'	Stadium: El Alcoraz; Attendance: 0 Referee: Antonio Mateu Lahoz

7 May 2021 35	Real Sociedad	2–0	Elche	San Sebastián
21:00 CEST (UTC+2)	Guevara (yellow card) 36'; Elustondo 72'; Oyarzabal 90+2'	Report	Guti (red card) 11'; Gazzaniga (yellow card) 11'; Fidel (yellow card) 12'; Barragán (yellow card) 24'	Stadium: Anoeta; Attendance: 0 Referee: Adrián Cordero Vega

12 May 2021 36	Atlético Madrid	2–1	Real Sociedad	Madrid
22:00 CEST (UTC+2)	Carrasco 16'; Correa 28'	Report	Zubeldia 83'	Stadium: Wanda Metropolitano; Attendance: 0 Referee: Guillermo Cuadra Fernández

16 May 2021 37	Real Sociedad	4–1	Valladolid	San Sebastián
18:30 CEST (UTC+2)	Isak 6', 16'; Silva 28'; Januzaj 35' (pen.), (yellow card) 59'; Bautista (yellow card) 63'	Report	Olaza (yellow card) 34'; Alcaraz (yellow card) 45+1'; Pérez (yellow card) 57'; Roberto (red card) 61'; Marcos André (yellow card) 66', (goal) 82'	Stadium: Anoeta; Attendance: 0 Referee: Carlos del Cerro Grande

22 May 2021 38	Osasuna	0–1	Real Sociedad	Pamplona
18:00 CEST (UTC+2)	Gallego (yellow card) 19'	Report	Isak 86'	Stadium: El Sadar; Attendance: 0 Referee: Jorge Figueroa Vázquez

=== Copa del Rey ===
20 January 2021 Round of 32	Córdoba	0–2	Real Sociedad	Córdoba
19:00 CET (UTC+1)	Molina (yellow card) 45+1'; Del Moral (yellow card) 57' (yellow-red card) 88'	Report	Illarramendi (yellow card) 36'; Willian José 57', 84'; Muñoz (yellow card) 81'	Stadium: Nuevo Arcángel; Referee: Guillermo Cuadra Fernández

26 January 2021 Round of 16	Real Betis	3–1 (a.e.t.)	Real Sociedad	Seville
21:00 CET (UTC+1)	Sanabria (yellow card) 13', (red card) 75'; Lainez (yellow card) 30'; Canales 78'; Iglesias 96', 111'; Ruiz (yellow card) 108'	Report	Oyarzabal 13'; Illarramendi (yellow card) 26' (yellow-red card) 48'; Merino (yellow card) 47'; Le Normand (yellow card) 110'	Stadium: Benito Villamarín; Referee: Antonio Mateu Lahoz

=== Supercopa de España ===
The draw was held on 17 December 2020.

13 January 2021 Semi-finals	Real Sociedad	1–1 (a.e.t.) (2–3 p)	Barcelona	Córdoba
21:00 CET (UTC+1)	Oyarzabal 51' (pen.); Le Normand (yellow card) 58'	Report	De Jong 39'; Dembélé (yellow card) 54'; Mingueza (yellow card) 97'	Stadium: Estadio Nuevo Arcángel; Attendance: 0 Referee: José Luis Munuera Montero
	Penalties
	Bautista (penalty missed); Oyarzabal (penalty missed); Willian José (penalty missed); Merino (penalty scored); Januzaj (penalty scored)		(penalty missed) De Jong; (penalty scored) Dembélé; (penalty scored) Pjanić; (penalty missed) Griezmann; (penalty scored) Puig

=== UEFA Europa League ===
==== Group stage ====
The group stage draw was held on 2 October 2020.

Pos	Team	Pld	W	D	L	GF	GA	GD	Pts	Qualification	NAP	RSO	AZ	RJK
1	(Italy) Napoli	6	3	2	1	7	4	+3	11	Advance to knockout phase	—	1–1	0–1	2–0
2	(Spain) Real Sociedad	6	2	3	1	5	4	+1	9	Advance to knockout phase	0–1	—	1–0	2–2
3	(Netherlands) AZ	6	2	2	2	7	5	+2	8		1–1	0–0	—	4–1
4	(Croatia) Rijeka	6	1	1	4	6	12	−6	4		1–2	0–1	2–1	—

Source: UEFA
Rules for classification: Group stage tiebreakers

22 October 2020 1	Rijeka (Croatia)	0–1	(Spain) Real Sociedad	Rijeka, Croatia
18:55 CEST (UTC+2)	Andrijašević (yellow card) 1'; Pavičić (yellow card) 36'; Capan (yellow card) 90'; Lepinjica (yellow card) 90+7'	Report	Merino (yellow card) 90'; Bautista 90+3'	Stadium: Stadion Rujevica; Attendance: 2,089; Referee: Bartosz Frankowski (Poland)

29 October 2020 2	Real Sociedad (Spain)	0–1	(Italy) Napoli	San Sebastián, Spain
21:00 CET (UTC+1)	Le Normand (yellow card) 72'	Report	Lozano (yellow card) 45'; Politano 56'; Osimhen (yellow card) 81' (yellow-red card) 90+2'	Stadium: Anoeta; Attendance: 0 (Note: Due to the COVID-19 pandemic in Europe, the match was played behind closed doors.); Referee: Craig Pawson (England)

5 November 2020 3	Real Sociedad (Spain)	1–0	(Netherlands) AZ	San Sebastián, Spain
18:55 CET (UTC+1)	Silva (yellow card) 45+1'; Portu 58'	Report	Guðmundsson (yellow card) 7'; Druijf (yellow card) 72'; Svensson (yellow card) 90+2'	Stadium: Anoeta; Attendance: 0 Referee: John Beaton (Scotland)

26 November 2020 4	AZ (Netherlands)	0–0	(Spain) Real Sociedad	Alkmaar, Netherlands
21:00 CET (UTC+1)	Midtsjø (yellow card) 26'; Svensson (yellow card) 42'; Martins Indi (yellow card) 75'; Chatzidiakos (yellow card) 79'; Boadu (yellow card) 90+3'	Report	Oyarzabal (yellow card) 75'	Stadium: AFAS Stadion; Attendance: 0 Referee: Aleksandar Stavrev (North Macedonia)

3 December 2020 5	Real Sociedad (Spain)	2–2	(Croatia) Rijeka	San Sebastián, Spain
21:00 CET (UTC+1)	Merino (yellow card) 23'; Bautista 69'; Monreal 79'	Report	Velkovski 38'; Andrijašević (yellow card) 41'; Halilović (yellow card) 68'; Lončar 73'	Stadium: Anoeta; Attendance: 0 Referee: João Pinheiro (Portugal)

10 December 2020 6	Napoli (Italy)	1–1	(Spain) Real Sociedad	Naples, Italy
18:55 CET (UTC+1)	Mertens (yellow card) 25'; Zieliński 35'; Lozano (yellow card) 41'; Fabián (yellow card) 59'	Report	Zubimendi (yellow card) 39'; Le Normand (yellow card) 68'; Zubeldia (yellow card) 82'; Willian José 90+2'	Stadium: Stadio San Paolo; Attendance: 0 Referee: Orel Grinfeld (Israel)

==== Knockout phase ====
===== Round of 32 =====
The draw for the round of 32 was held on 14 December 2020.

18 February 2021 First leg	Real Sociedad (Spain)	0–4	(England) Manchester United	Turin, Italy
18:55 CET (UTC+1)	Le Normand (yellow card) 89'	Report	Wan-Bissaka (yellow card) 8'; Fernandes 27', 57'; Rashford 65'; James 90'	Stadium: Juventus Stadium; Attendance: 0 Referee: Sandro Schärer (Switzerland)
Note: The match, originally to be played at Anoeta in San Sebastián, was moved to Juventus Stadium in Turin, due to restrictions imposed by Spain on travelers from the United Kingdom out of concern of the COVID-19 variant B.1.1.7.

25 February 2021 Second leg	Manchester United (England)	0–0 (4–0 agg.)	(Spain) Real Sociedad	Manchester, England
21:00 CET (UTC+1)	Fred (yellow card) 41'; Williams (yellow card) 50'; Lindelöf (yellow card) 65'	Report	Oyarzabal (penalty missed) 14'	Stadium: Old Trafford; Attendance: 0 Referee: Lawrence Visser (Belgium)

== Statistics ==
=== Squad statistics ===
Last updated on 22 May 2021. Does not include the 2020 Copa del Rey Final, delayed until April 2021 and counted in the 2020–21 season in some resources – these stats are recorded under the 2019–20 Real Sociedad season article.

No.	Pos	Nat	Player	Total		La Liga		Copa del Rey		Supercopa de España		UEFA Europa League	
No.	Pos	Nat	Player	Apps	Goals	Apps	Goals	Apps	Goals	Apps	Goals	Apps	Goals
Goalkeepers
1	GK	(Spain) ESP	Álex Remiro	48	0	38	0	2	0	1	0	7	0
13	GK	(Spain) ESP	Miguel Ángel Moyá	1	0	0	0	0	0	0	0	1	0
Defenders
2	DF	(Spain) ESP	Joseba Zaldúa	18	0	6+6	0	1	0	0+1	0	4	0
6	DF	(Spain) ESP	Aritz Elustondo	28	1	22+1	1	2	0	0	0	3	0
12	DF	(Spain) ESP	Aihen Muñoz	19	0	14+2	0	1	0	0	0	1+1	0
15	DF	(France) FRA	Modibo Sagnan	21	0	7+9	0	1	0	0	0	3+1	0
18	DF	(Spain) ESP	Andoni Gorosabel	40	0	28+4	0	1	0	1	0	3+3	0
20	DF	(Spain) ESP	Nacho Monreal	35	2	23+3	1	1	0	1	0	7	1
24	DF	(France) FRA	Robin Le Normand	43	0	30+3	0	1+1	0	1	0	7	0
26	DF	(Spain) ESP	Jon Pacheco	1	0	0+1	0	0	0	0	0	0	0
33	DF	(Spain) ESP	Aritz Arambarri	1	0	0+1	0	0	0	0	0	0	0
Midfielders
4	MF	(Spain) ESP	Asier Illarramendi	9	0	6	0	2	0	0	0	1	0
5	MF	(Spain) ESP	Igor Zubeldia	31	1	21+3	1	0+2	0	1	0	4	0
7	MF	(Spain) ESP	Portu	47	9	24+13	8	1	0	1	0	5+3	1
8	MF	(Spain) ESP	Mikel Merino	36	2	25+1	2	1	0	1	0	8	0
11	MF	(Belgium) BEL	Adnan Januzaj	36	4	12+15	4	0+1	0	0+1	0	5+2	0
14	MF	(Spain) ESP	Jon Guridi	22	0	8+9	0	1+1	0	1	0	0+2	0
16	MF	(Spain) ESP	Ander Guevara	38	1	25+6	1	0+1	0	1	0	4+1	0
17	MF	(Spain) ESP	Martín Merquelanz	17	0	4+9	0	1+1	0	0	0	0+2	0
21	MF	(Spain) ESP	David Silva	26	2	17+4	2	0	0	0	0	5	0
23	MF	(Spain) ESP	Luca Sangalli	0	0	0	0	0	0	0	0	0	0
28	MF	(Spain) ESP	Roberto López	20	3	4+13	3	1	0	0	0	0+2	0
29	MF	(Spain) ESP	Robert Navarro	1	0	0+1	0	0	0	0	0	0	0
36	MF	(Spain) ESP	Martín Zubimendi	41	0	17+14	0	1+1	0	0+1	0	5+2	0
37	MF	(Spain) ESP	Urko González	2	0	1+1	0	0	0	0	0	0	0
Forwards
9	FW	(Spain) ESP	Carlos Fernández	12	1	4+7	1	0+1	0	0	0	0	0
10	FW	(Spain) ESP	Mikel Oyarzabal	43	13	30+3	11	1+1	1	1	1	7	0
19	FW	(Sweden) SWE	Alexander Isak	44	17	30+4	17	1	0	1	0	7+1	0
22	FW	(Spain) ESP	Ander Barrenetxea	40	3	13+18	3	1+1	0	0+1	0	0+6	0
25	FW	(Spain) ESP	Jon Bautista	27	2	0+21	0	0	0	0+1	0	0+5	2
Players who have made an appearance this season but have left the club
3	DF	(Spain) ESP	Diego Llorente	1	0	1	0	0	0	0	0	0	0
9	FW	(Brazil) BRA	Willian José	21	6	8+5	3	1	2	0+1	0	1+5	1
30	GK	(Spain) ESP	Andoni Zubiaurre	0	0	0	0	0	0	0	0	0	0

=== Goalscorers ===
As of 30 January 2021

Rank	No.	Pos	Nat	Name	La Liga	Copa del Rey	Supercopa de España	Europa League	Total
1	13	MF	(Spain)	Mikel Oyarzabal	11	1	1	0	13
2	7	MF	(Spain)	Portu	5	0	0	1	6
2	9	FW	(Brazil)	Willian José	3	2	0	1	6
2	14	FW	(Sweden)	Alexander Isak	6	0	0	0	6
5	11	MF	(Belgium)	Adnan Januzaj	2	0	0	0	2
5	28	MF	(Spain)	Roberto López	2	0	0	0	2
5	25	FW	(Spain)	Jon Bautista	0	0	0	2	2
5	20	DF	(Spain)	Nacho Monreal	1	0	0	1	2
5	22	FW	(Spain)	Ander Barrenetxea	2	0	0	0	2
10	8	MF	(Spain)	Mikel Merino	1	0	0	0	1
10	21	MF	(Spain)	David Silva	1	0	0	0	1
Own goal					1	0	0	0	1
Totals					32	3	1	5	41
