= 2019–20 Real Sociedad season =

Real Sociedad
2019–20 season
- President: Jokin Aperribay
- Head coach: Imanol Alguacil
- Stadium: Anoeta
- La Liga: 6th
- Copa del Rey: Winners
- Top goalscorer: League: Willian José (11); All: Alexander Isak (16)
- Highest home attendance: 36,730 (vs Athletic Bilbao, 9 February 2020)
- Lowest home attendance: 26,446 (vs Leganés, 8 November 2019)
- Average home league attendance: 30,675
- Biggest win: Becerril 0–8 Real Sociedad
- Biggest defeat: Real Betis 3–0 Real Sociedad
Home colours	Away colours	Third colours

The 2019–20 season was Real Sociedad's 73rd season (and the 10th consecutive) in La Liga, the top flight of Spanish football. In addition to the domestic league, Real Sociedad participated in this season's edition of the Copa del Rey. The season was slated to cover a period from 1 July 2019 to 30 June 2020. It was extended extraordinarily beyond 30 June due to the COVID-19 pandemic in Spain.

== Players ==
=== Current squad ===
As of 1 February 2020

Note: Flags indicate national team as defined under FIFA eligibility rules; some limited exceptions apply. Players may hold more than one non-FIFA nationality.

No.	Pos.	Nation	Player
1	GK	ESP	Álex Remiro
2	DF	ESP	Joseba Zaldúa
3	DF	ESP	Diego Llorente
4	MF	ESP	Asier Illarramendi (Captain)
5	MF	ESP	Igor Zubeldia
6	DF	ESP	Aritz Elustondo
7	MF	ESP	Portu
8	MF	ESP	Mikel Merino
9	FW	BRA	Willian José
10	MF	ESP	Mikel Oyarzabal (Vice-captain)
11	MF	BEL	Adnan Januzaj
12	DF	ESP	Aihen Muñoz

No.	Pos.	Nation	Player
13	GK	ESP	Miguel Ángel Moyá
16	MF	ESP	Ander Guevara
17	MF	ESP	David Zurutuza (3rd captain)
18	DF	ESP	Andoni Gorosabel
19	FW	SWE	Alexander Isak
20	DF	ESP	Nacho Monreal
21	MF	NOR	Martin Ødegaard (on loan from Real Madrid)
22	FW	ESP	Ander Barrenetxea
23	MF	ESP	Luca Sangalli
24	DF	FRA	Robin Le Normand
30	GK	ESP	Andoni Zubiaurre

=== Reserve team ===
Note: Flags indicate national team as defined under FIFA eligibility rules; some limited exceptions apply. Players may hold more than one non-FIFA nationality.

No.	Pos.	Nation	Player
33	DF	ESP	Aritz Arambarri

=== Out on loan ===
Note: Flags indicate national team as defined under FIFA eligibility rules; some limited exceptions apply. Players may hold more than one non-FIFA nationality.

No.	Pos.	Nation	Player
—	GK	ARG	Gerónimo Rulli (at Montpellier until 30 June 2020)
—	DF	ESP	Raúl Navas (at Osasuna until 30 June 2020)
—	DF	POR	Kévin Rodrigues (at Leganés until 30 June 2020)
—	DF	ESP	Álex Sola (at Numancia until 30 June 2020)

No.	Pos.	Nation	Player
—	DF	FRA	Modibo Sagnan (at Mirandés until 30 June 2020)
—	MF	ESP	Jon Guridi (at Mirandés until 30 June 2020)
—	MF	ESP	Martín Merquelanz (at Mirandés until 30 June 2020)
—	FW	ESP	Jon Bautista (at Eupen until 30 June 2020)

== Transfers ==
=== In ===
Date	Player	From	Type	Fee	Ref
30 June 2019	(France) Modibo Sagnan	(France) Lens	Loan return		
1 July 2019	(Sweden) Alexander Isak	(Germany) Borussia Dortmund	Transfer	€8M	
1 July 2019	(Spain) Álex Remiro	Athletic Bilbao	Transfer	Free	
1 July 2019	(Spain) Portu	Girona	Transfer	€10M	
5 July 2019	(Norway) Martin Ødegaard	Real Madrid	Loan		
31 August 2019	(Spain) Nacho Monreal	(England) Arsenal	Transfer	€250k	

=== Out ===
Date	Player	To	Type	Fee	Ref
30 June 2019	(France) Théo Hernandez	Real Madrid	Loan return		
30 June 2019	(Spain) Sandro Ramírez	(England) Everton	Loan return		
1 July 2019	(Spain) Juanmi	Real Betis	Transfer	€8M	
11 July 2019	(Spain) Jon Bautista	(Belgium) Eupen	Loan		
12 July 2019	(Spain) Eneko Capilla	(Cyprus) Asteras Tripolis	Transfer	Undisclosed	
19 July 2019	(Spain) Martín Merquelanz	Albacete	Loan		
29 July 2019	(Mexico) Héctor Moreno	(Qatar) Al-Gharafa	Transfer	Undisclosed	
14 August 2019	(Spain) Raúl Navas	Osasuna	Loan		
14 August 2019	(Argentina) Gerónimo Rulli	(France) Montpellier	Loan	€1.5M	
2 September 2019	(Portugal) Kévin Rodrigues	Leganés	Loan		

== Pre-season and friendlies ==
Win Draw Loss

13 July 2019 Friendly	Lagun Onak	0–5	Real Sociedad	Azpeitia, Spain
19:00 CEST (UTC+2)		Report	Muñoz 15'; Januzaj 20'; Isak 31'; Portu 69'; Willian José 90' (pen.)	Stadium: Estadio Garmendipe; Referee: Díaz Méndez

20 July 2019 Friendly	Real Sociedad	0–1	Racing Santander	Zarautz, Spain
19:00 CEST (UTC+2)		Report	Díaz 36'	Stadium: Estadio Asti Kirol Instalakuntzak

26 July 2019 Friendly	Nottingham Forest	2–2	Real Sociedad	West Bridgford, England
19:45 BST (UTC+1)	Worrall 4'; Grabban 28'	Report	López 13'; Djouahra 88'	Stadium: City Ground; Attendance: 14,216; Referee: Jez Simpson

27 July 2019 Friendly	Millwall	3–3	Real Sociedad	Bermondsey, England
14:00 BST (UTC+1)	Wallace 20' (pen.); Thompson 49'; Mahoney 83'	Report	Isak 22', 53'; Zurutuza 31'	Stadium: The Den; Attendance: 3,554; Referee: Tim Robinson

31 July 2019 Friendly	Real Sociedad	1–0	Alavés	Lasarte-Oria, Spain
19:00 CEST (UTC+2)	Rodrigues 18'	Report		Stadium: Estadio Zubieta XXI

3 August 2019 Friendly	Watford	2–1	Real Sociedad	Watford, England
15:00 BST (UTC+1)	Gray 48', 88'	Report	Oyarzabal 27' (pen.)	Stadium: Vicarage Road

9 August 2019 Friendly	Real Sociedad	2–0	Osasuna	Irun, Spain
19:30 CEST (UTC+2)	Oyarzabal 48'; Portu 70'	Report		Stadium: Stadium Gal

10 August 2019 Euskal Herriko Futbol Txapelketa	Real Sociedad	1–2	Eibar	Tolosa, Spain
20:30 CEST (UTC+2)	Isak 15'	Report	Oliveira 22'; De Blasis 74'	Stadium: Estadio Berazubi; Referee: Sagúes Oscoz

5 September 2019 Friendly	Real Sociedad	0–0	Alavés	Tafalla, Spain
18:00 CEST (UTC+2)		Report		Stadium: Campo San Francisco

10 October 2019 Friendly	Osasuna	0–0	Real Sociedad	Pamplona, Spain
11:00 CEST (UTC+2)		Report		Stadium: Tajonar Facilities Stadium; Referee: Recio Moreno

14 November 2019 Friendly	Real Sociedad	0–1	Osasuna	Zubieta, Spain
11:00 CET (UTC+1)		Report	I. Pérez 50'	Stadium: Campo José Luis Orbegozo; Attendance: 700; Referee: Nacho Díaz

== Competitions ==
=== Overview ===
Competition	First match	Last match	Starting round	Final position	Record							
Competition	First match	Last match	Starting round	Final position	Pld	W	D	L	GF	GA	GD	Win %
La Liga	17 August 2019	19 July 2020	Matchday 1	6th	38	16	8	14	56	48	+8	42.11
Copa del Rey	19 December 2019	3 April 2021	First round	Winners	8	8	0	0	25	5	+20	100.00
Total					46	24	8	14	81	53	+28	52.17

Source: Soccerway

=== La Liga ===
==== League table ====
Pos	Team	Pld	W	D	L	GF	GA	GD	Pts	Qualification or relegation
4	Sevilla	38	19	13	6	54	34	+20	70	Qualification for the Champions League group stage
5	Villarreal	38	18	6	14	63	49	+14	60	Qualification for the Europa League group stage
6	Real Sociedad	38	16	8	14	56	48	+8	56	Qualification for the Europa League group stage
7	Granada	38	16	8	14	52	45	+7	56	Qualification for the Europa League second qualifying round (Note: The 2020 Copa del Rey Final was postponed due to the COVID-19 pandemic in Spain and could not be completed by the UEFA registration deadline of 3 August 2020, so the fifth- and sixth-placed teams in the 2019–20 La Liga, Villarreal and Real Sociedad, entered the 2020–21 UEFA Europa League at the group stage, and the seventh-placed team, Granada, entered at the second qualifying round.)
8	Getafe	38	14	12	12	43	37	+6	54	

Source: La Liga, Soccerway
Rules for classification: 1) Points; 2) Head-to-head points; 3) Head-to-head goal difference; 4) Goal difference; 5) Goals scored; 6) Fair-play points (Note: Head-to-head record is used only after all the matches between the teams in question have been played)

==== Results summary ====
Overall								Home						Away					
Pld	W	D	L	GF	GA	GD	Pts	W	D	L	GF	GA	GD	W	D	L	GF	GA	GD
38	16	8	14	56	48	+8	56	9	4	6	33	20	+13	7	4	8	23	28	−5

Source: La Liga

==== Results by round ====
Round	1	2	3	4	5	6	7	8	9	10	11	12	13	14	15	16	17	18	19	20	21	22	23	24	25	26	27	28	29	30	31	32	33	34	35	36	37	38
Ground	A	A	A	H	A	H	A	H	H	A	H	A	H	A	H	A	H	A	H	A	H	A	H	A	H	H	A	H	A	H	H	A	H	A	H	A	H	A
Result	D	W	L	W	W	W	L	L	W	W	L	W	D	L	W	D	D	W	L	L	W	L	W	W	W	W	L	D	L	L	L	L	W	D	L	W	D	D
Position	11	6	13	7	4	2	5	5	4	3	6	3	5	6	4	4	6	5	5	6	6	8	6	6	6	6	4	4	6	7	7	7	7	7	7	7	6	6

Source: La Liga
A = Away; H = Home; W = Win; D = Draw; L = Loss

==== Matches ====
The La Liga schedule was announced on 4 July 2019.

17 August 2019 1	Valencia	1–1	Real Sociedad	Valencia
19:00 CEST (UTC+2)	Gameiro 58'; Coquelin (yellow card) 63' (yellow-red card) 90+10'; Cheryshev (yellow card) 90+5'; Garay (yellow card) 90+8'	Report	Ødegaard (yellow card) 29'; Merino (yellow card) 36'; Zaldúa (yellow card) 42'; Le Normand (yellow card) 57'; Oyarzabal 90+11' (pen.)	Stadium: Mestalla; Attendance: 41,953; Referee: Jesús Gil Manzano

25 August 2019 2	Mallorca	0–1	Real Sociedad	Palma
17:00 CEST (UTC+2)	Raíllo (yellow card) 78'	Report	Merino (yellow card) 19'; Le Normand (yellow card) 57'; Ødegaard 83'	Stadium: Estadi de Son Moix; Attendance: 17,257; Referee: Valentín Pizarro Gómez

30 August 2019 3	Athletic Bilbao	2–0	Real Sociedad	Bilbao
22:00 CEST (UTC+2)	Williams 11'; R. García 28', (yellow card) 36'; Córdoba (yellow card) 72'	Report	Zaldúa (yellow card) 13'; Portu (yellow card) 45+3'	Stadium: San Mamés Stadium; Attendance: 46,391; Referee: Xavier Estrada Fernández

14 September 2019 4	Real Sociedad	2–0	Atlético Madrid	San Sebastián
18:30 CEST (UTC+2)	Zubeldia (yellow card) 45'; Ødegaard 58'; Monreal 61'	Report	Trippier (yellow card) 51'; Llorente (yellow card) 60'; Costa (yellow card) 69'	Stadium: Anoeta; Attendance: 33,374; Referee: Antonio Mateu Lahoz

22 September 2019 5	Espanyol	1–3	Real Sociedad	Cornellà de Llobregat
14:00 CEST (UTC+2)	Granero (yellow card) 27'; Zaldúa 71' (o.g.)	Report	Willian José 18', 34'; Isak 75'	Stadium: RCDE Stadium; Attendance: 18,412; Referee: Adrián Cordero Vega

26 September 2019 6	Real Sociedad	3–0	Alavés	San Sebastián
21:00 CEST (UTC+2)	Oyarzabal 19', 41' (pen.); Willian José 32'; Portu (yellow card) 27'	Report	Wakaso (yellow card) 27'; Pina (yellow card) 49'; García (yellow card) 74' (yellow-red card) 85'	Stadium: Anoeta; Attendance: 28,414; Referee: David Medié Jiménez

29 September 2019 7	Sevilla	3–2	Real Sociedad	Seville
21:00 CEST (UTC+2)	Nolito 18'; Ocampos 47'; Fernando (yellow card) 59'; Vázquez 80'	Report	Oyarzabal 4'; Ødegaard (yellow card) 57'; Portu 87'	Stadium: Ramón Sánchez Pizjuán; Attendance: 37,458; Referee: Javier Alberola Rojas

6 October 2019 8	Real Sociedad	1–2	Getafe	San Sebastián
18:30 CEST (UTC+2)	Merino 5'; Llorente (yellow card) 10' (yellow-red card) 53'	Report	Mata (yellow card) 32', (goal) 69'; Suárez (yellow card) 44'; Fajr (yellow card) 73'; Cabrera (yellow card) 80'; Maksimović 89'	Stadium: Anoeta; Attendance: 29,864; Referee: Pablo González Fuertes

20 October 2019 9	Real Sociedad	3–1	Real Betis	San Sebastián
14:00 CEST (UTC+2)	García 22' (o.g.); Guevara (yellow card) 28'; Willian José 36'; Portu 58'; Le Normand (yellow card) 85'; Zubeldia (yellow card) 86'; Ødegaard (yellow card) 90+2'	Report	Loren 12'; García (yellow card) 63'; Joaquín (yellow card) 79'	Stadium: Anoeta; Attendance: 27,934; Referee: César Soto Grado

27 October 2019 10	Celta Vigo	0–1	Real Sociedad	Vigo
12:00 CET (UTC+1)	Mallo (yellow card) 56'; Diop (yellow card) 60' (yellow-red card) 66'; Aspas (yellow card) 77'; Jorge (yellow card) 90+3'	Report	Zubeldia (yellow card) 71'; Isak 82'; Oyarzabal (yellow card) 87'	Stadium: Abanca-Balaídos; Attendance: 18,002; Referee: Valentín Pizarro Gómez

30 October 2019 11	Real Sociedad	1–2	Levante	San Sebastián
19:00 CET (UTC+1)	Willian José 48', (yellow card) 56'; Zaldúa (yellow card) 90+6'; Portu (yellow card) 90+6'	Report	Bardhi 24'; Melero (yellow card) 37'; Mayoral 40'; Clerc (yellow card) 42'; Postigo (yellow card) 89'; Fernández (yellow card) 90+3'	Stadium: Anoeta; Attendance: 28,142; Referee: Mario Melero López

3 November 2019 12	Granada	1–2	Real Sociedad	Granada
21:00 CET (UTC+1)	Vadillo 36'	Report	Portu 21', 89'; Le Normand (yellow card) 33'; Willian José (yellow card) 35'	Stadium: Nuevo Estadio de Los Cármenes; Attendance: 16,921; Referee: Eduardo Prieto Iglesias

8 November 2019 13	Real Sociedad	1–1	Leganés	San Sebastián
21:00 CET (UTC+1)	Monreal (yellow card) 19'; Merino 63', (yellow card) 90+6'	Report	Recio (yellow card) 2'; Bustinza (yellow card) 38'; Rodrigues (yellow card) 57' (yellow-red card) 90+7'; En-Nesyri 78'; Omeruo (yellow card) 86'; Rosales (yellow card) 90+4'	Stadium: Anoeta; Attendance: 26,446; Referee: Juan Martínez Munuera

23 November 2019 14	Real Madrid	3–1	Real Sociedad	Madrid
21:00 CET (UTC+1)	Benzema 37'; Valverde 47'; Ramos (yellow card) 52'; Modrić 74'	Report	Willian José 2'; Zaldúa (yellow card) 84'	Stadium: Santiago Bernabéu; Attendance: 69,305; Referee: Jesús Gil Manzano

30 November 2019 15	Real Sociedad	4–1	Eibar	San Sebastián
16:00 CET (UTC+1)	Le Normand 25'; Zaldúa (yellow card) 41'; Oyarzabal 47'; Willian José 57'; Ødegaard 80'	Report	Ramis (yellow card) 24'; Diop 35', (yellow card) 48'; Oliveira (yellow card) 72'; Escalante (yellow card) 76'	Stadium: Anoeta; Attendance: 28,612; Referee: Carlos del Cerro Grande

8 December 2019 16	Valladolid	0–0	Real Sociedad	Valladolid
16:00 CET (UTC+1)		Report	Le Normand (yellow card) 20'; Oyarzabal (yellow card) 68'; Isak (yellow card) 76'; Llorente (yellow card) 81'	Stadium: José Zorrilla; Attendance: 18,654; Referee: Pablo González Fuertes

14 December 2019 17	Real Sociedad	2–2	Barcelona	San Sebastián
16:00 CET (UTC+1)	Oyarzabal 12' (pen.); Isak 62'	Report	Griezmann 38'; Suárez 49', (yellow card) 74'	Stadium: Anoeta; Attendance: 36,639; Referee: Javier Alberola Rojas

22 December 2019 18	Osasuna	3–4	Real Sociedad	Pamplona
14:00 CET (UTC+1)	Estupiñán (yellow card) 34'; Aridane 45+1', (yellow card) 90+5'; Brašanac (yellow card) 46'; Ávila 48', 84'; Roncaglia (red card) 70'; Herrera (yellow card) 71'; Villar (yellow card) 88'; Mérida (yellow card) 90+1'	Report	Zubeldia (yellow card) 5'; Oyarzabal 15'; Portu 18'; Ødegaard 28'; Willian José (yellow card) 71'; Isak 79'	Stadium: El Sadar; Attendance: 16,197; Referee: David Medié Jiménez

5 January 2020 19	Real Sociedad	1–2	Villarreal	San Sebastián
14:00 CET (UTC+1)	Willian José 22'; Zubeldia (yellow card) 30'; Zaldúa (yellow card) 70'; Guevara (yellow card) 72'; Januzaj (yellow card) 85'; Portu (yellow card) 90+6'	Report	Torres (yellow card) 55'; Trigueros 58' (pen.); Mario (yellow card) 61'; Moreno (yellow card) 65'; Cazorla 72'; Albiol (yellow card) 77'	Stadium: Anoeta; Attendance: 31,486; Referee: José María Sánchez Martínez

19 January 2020 20	Real Betis	3–0	Real Sociedad	Seville
14:00 CET (UTC+1)	Guardado (yellow card) 23'; Iglesias 27'; Joaquín 44'; Moreno (yellow card) 69'; Emerson (yellow card) 90+1'; Canales 90+5'	Report	Llorente (yellow card) 16'	Stadium: Benito Villamarín; Attendance: 50,096; Referee: Adrián Cordero Vega

26 January 2020 21	Real Sociedad	3–0	Mallorca	San Sebastián
18:30 CET (UTC+1)	Isak 46'; Barrenetxea 58'; Portu 81'	Report	Valjent (yellow card) 64'; Lumor (yellow card) 90+3'	Stadium: Anoeta; Attendance: 29,785; Referee: Santiago Jaime Latre

2 February 2020 22	Leganés	2–1	Real Sociedad	Leganés
12:00 CET (UTC+1)	Recio (yellow card) 18'; Omeruo 49'; Awaziem (yellow card) 69'; Carrillo (yellow card) 78'; Silva (yellow card) 80'; Óscar 90+4'	Report	Isak 20'; Zubeldia (yellow card) 39'; Willian José (yellow card) 89'; Guevara (yellow card) 90+3'	Stadium: Estadio Municipal de Butarque; Attendance: 10,913; Referee: Mario Melero López

9 February 2020 23	Real Sociedad	2–1	Athletic Bilbao	San Sebastián
14:00 CET (UTC+1)	Portu (yellow card) 63', (goal) 65'; Isak 83', (yellow card) 89'	Report	Capa (yellow card) 63'; Williams 71'; D. García (yellow card) 81'; Muniain (red card) 89'	Stadium: Anoeta; Attendance: 36,730; Referee: José Luis Munuera Montero

22 February 2020 25	Real Sociedad	3–0	Valencia	San Sebastián
18:30 CET (UTC+1)	Merino 12', (yellow card) 38'; Monreal 45+1'; Januzaj 48'	Report	Costa (yellow card) 88'	Stadium: Anoeta; Attendance: 31,416; Referee: José Luis González González

28 February 2020 26	Real Sociedad	1–0	Valladolid	San Sebastián
21:00 CET (UTC+1)	Elustondo (yellow card) 28'; Januzaj 60'	Report	Guardiola (yellow card) 70'	Stadium: Anoeta; Attendance: 30,677; Referee: Valentín Pizarro Gómez

7 March 2020 27	Barcelona	1–0	Real Sociedad	Barcelona
18:30 CET (UTC+1)	Lenglet (yellow card) 16'; Messi (yellow card) 42', (goal) 81' (pen.); Piqué (yellow card) 61'; Busquets (yellow card) 88'	Report	Merino (yellow card) 57'; Guevara (yellow card) 77'; Oyarzabal (yellow card) 80'	Stadium: Camp Nou; Attendance: 77,035; Referee: Juan Martínez Munuera

10 March 2020 24	Eibar	1–2	Real Sociedad	Eibar
20:00 CET (UTC+1)	Bigas (yellow card) 15'; Cote (yellow card) 29'; Escalante (yellow card) 35'; Charles 90' (pen.)	Report	Oyarzabal 16' (pen.); Zubeldia (yellow card) 28'; Januzaj (yellow card) 37'; Willian José 75'	Stadium: Ipurua Municipal Stadium; Attendance: 0 Referee: David Medié Jiménez
Note: Match originally scheduled for 16 February, but postponed due to air contamination, and rearranged for 10 March.

14 June 2020 28	Real Sociedad	1–1	Osasuna	San Sebastián
22:00 CEST (UTC+2)	Oyarzabal 61'; Merino (yellow card) 67'	Report	Oier (yellow card) 25'; Adrián 29' (pen.); Gallego (yellow card) 72'; Pérez (yellow card) 87'	Stadium: Anoeta; Attendance: 0 Referee: Adrián Cordero Vega
Note: The match was originally scheduled for 15 March, but was postponed due to the COVID-19 pandemic, and rescheduled to 14 June. It was played behind closed doors.

18 June 2020 29	Alavés	2–0	Real Sociedad	Vitoria-Gasteiz
19:30 CEST (UTC+2)	Duarte (yellow card) 51'; Sainz 56'; Pina (yellow card) 71' (yellow-red card) 87'; Aguirregabiria 90+6'	Report	Llorente (yellow card) 42'; Elustondo (yellow card) 49'; Zaldúa (yellow card) 54' (yellow-red card) 81'	Stadium: Mendizorrotza; Attendance: 0 Referee: Santiago Jaime Latre
Note: The match was originally scheduled for 22 March, but was postponed due to the 2020 coronavirus pandemic, and rescheduled to 18 June. It was played behind closed doors.

21 June 2020 30	Real Sociedad	1–2	Real Madrid	San Sebastián
22:00 CEST (UTC+2)	Zubeldia (yellow card) 16'; Gorosabel (yellow card) 28'; Llorente (yellow card) 48'; Merino 83', (yellow card) 90+7'	Report	Casemiro (yellow card) 21'; Ramos 50' (pen.); Benzema 70'; Modrić (yellow card) 90+6'	Stadium: Anoeta; Attendance: 0 Referee: Xavier Estrada Fernández
Note: The match was originally scheduled for 5 April, but was postponed due to the 2020 coronavirus pandemic, and rescheduled to 21 June. It was played behind closed doors.

24 June 2020 31	Real Sociedad	0–1	Celta Vigo	San Sebastián
19:30 CEST (UTC+2)	Monreal (yellow card) 21'; Llorente (yellow card) 44'; Zubimendi (yellow card) 55'; Januzaj (yellow card) 90+4'	Report	Aspas 45' (pen.); Rafinha (yellow card) 59'; Smolov (yellow card) 90'	Stadium: Anoeta; Attendance: 0 Referee: Eduardo Prieto Iglesias
Note: The match was originally scheduled for 12 April, but was postponed due to the 2020 coronavirus pandemic, and rescheduled to 24 June. It was played behind closed doors.

29 June 2020 32	Getafe	2–1	Real Sociedad	Getafe
22:00 CEST (UTC+2)	Olivera (yellow card) 11'; Duro (yellow card) 13'; Mata 20' (pen.), 83', (yellow card) 88'; Chema (yellow card) 43'; Suárez (yellow card) 68'; Etebo (yellow card) 79'	Report	Januzaj 55'; Isak (yellow card) 66'; Oyarzabal (yellow card) 73'; Merino (yellow card) 88'	Stadium: Coliseum Alfonso Pérez; Attendance: 0 Referee: Adrián Cordero Vega
Note: The match was originally scheduled for 22 April, but was postponed due to the 2020 coronavirus pandemic, and rescheduled to 29 June. It was played behind closed doors.

2 July 2020 33	Real Sociedad	2–1	Espanyol	San Sebastián
19:30 CEST (UTC+2)	Zubeldia (yellow card) 37'; Zubimendi (yellow card) 50'; Willian José 56'; Isak 84'	Report	Da. López 10'; Nico (yellow card) 34'	Stadium: Anoeta; Attendance: 0 Referee: José María Sánchez Martínez
Note: The match was originally scheduled for 26 April, but was postponed due to the 2020 coronavirus pandemic, and rescheduled to 2 July. It was played behind closed doors.

6 July 2020 34	Levante	1–1	Real Sociedad	La Nucia
19:30 CEST (UTC+2)	Morales 16'; Vukčević (yellow card) 67'; Postigo (yellow card) 90'	Report	Isak 12'; Zubimendi (yellow card) 14'; Elustondo (yellow card) 63'	Stadium: Camilo Cano; Attendance: 0 Referee: Valentín Pizarro Gómez
Note: The match was originally scheduled for 3 May, but was postponed due to the 2020 coronavirus pandemic, and rescheduled to 6 July. It was played behind closed doors.

10 July 2020 35	Real Sociedad	2–3	Granada	San Sebastián
19:30 CEST (UTC+2)	Muñoz (yellow card) 4'; Merino 47'; Elustondo (yellow card) 67'; Oyarzabal 83'	Report	Fernández (yellow card) 7'; Puertas 21', (yellow card) 88'; Soldado (yellow card) 39', (goal) 43'; Duarte 88'	Stadium: Anoeta; Attendance: 0 Referee: Juan Martínez Munuera
Note: The match was originally scheduled for 10 May, but was postponed due to the 2020 coronavirus pandemic, and rescheduled to 10 July. It was played behind closed doors.

13 July 2020 35	Villarreal	1–2	Real Sociedad	Villarreal
19:30 CEST (UTC+2)	Ontiveros (yellow card) 35'; Trigueros (yellow card) 36'; Cazorla 85'	Report	Merino (yellow card) 2'; Willian José 61'; Le Normand (yellow card) 70'; Llorente 75'	Stadium: Estadio de la Cerámica; Attendance: 0 Referee: Guillermo Cuadra Fernández
Note: The match was originally scheduled for 13 May, but was postponed due to the 2020 coronavirus pandemic, and rescheduled to 13 July. It was played behind closed doors.

16 July 2020 37	Real Sociedad	0–0	Sevilla	San Sebastián
21:00 CEST (UTC+2)	Barrenetxea (yellow card) 90+6'	Report	Koundé (yellow card) 45+1'; Banega (yellow card) 90+1'	Stadium: Anoeta; Attendance: 0 Referee: Carlos del Cerro Grande
Note: The match was originally scheduled for 17 May, but was postponed due to the 2020 coronavirus pandemic, and rescheduled to 16 July. It was played behind closed doors.

19 July 2020 38	Atlético Madrid	1–1	Real Sociedad	Madrid
21:00 CEST (UTC+2)	Koke 30'; Partey (yellow card) 45+3'	Report	Gorosabel (yellow card) 18'; Januzaj 87'; Monreal (yellow card) 90'	Stadium: Wanda Metropolitano; Attendance: 0 Referee: Pablo González Fuertes
Note: The match was originally scheduled for 24 May, but was postponed due to the 2020 coronavirus pandemic, and rescheduled to 19 July. It was played behind closed doors.

=== Copa del Rey ===
19 December 2019 First round	Becerril	0–8	Real Sociedad	Palencia (Note: Becerril played at Nueva Balastera instead of their regular stadium Mariano Haro, in Becerril de Campos, after mutual agreement between both clubs and official approval from the Royal Spanish Football Federation.)
21:00 CET (UTC+1)	Gutiérrez (yellow card) 59'; López (yellow card) 61'; Sierra (yellow card) 89'	Report	Le Normand 37'; Januzaj 44', 46', 63'; Pardo 49'; Isak 68', 75'; Barrenetxea 69'	Stadium: Nueva Balastera; Attendance: 8,000; Referee: Mario Melero López

12 January 2020 Second round	Ceuta	0–4	Real Sociedad	Ceuta
16:00 CET (UTC+1)	Pozo (yellow card) 73'; Willy (yellow card) 82'	Report	Sangalli 55', 61'; Januzaj 57'; Barrenetxea 66', (yellow card) 81'	Stadium: Alfonso Murube; Attendance: 6,000; Referee: José Luis Munuera Montero

22 January 2020 Round of 32	Real Sociedad	2–0	Espanyol	San Sebastián
21:00 CET (UTC+1)	Merino (yellow card) 25'; Guevara (yellow card) 40'; Barrenetxea 45+1'; Muñoz (yellow card) 54'; Isak 62'	Report	Wu Lei (yellow card) 20'; Lozano (yellow card) 37'; J. López (yellow card) 68'	Stadium: Anoeta; Attendance: 21,647; Referee: Alejandro Hernández Hernández

29 January 2020 Round of 16	Real Sociedad	3–1	Osasuna	San Sebastián
21:00 CET (UTC+1)	Zubeldia (yellow card) 19'; Isak 33', 69'; Ødegaard 61'	Report	Cardona 36'; R. García (yellow card) 38'; Aridane (yellow card) 60'	Stadium: Anoeta; Attendance: 31,236; Referee: José Luis Munuera Montero

6 February 2020 Quarter-finals	Real Madrid	3–4	Real Sociedad	Madrid
19:00 CET (UTC+1)	Marcelo 59'; Militão (yellow card) 78'; Rodrygo 81'; Nacho 90+3'; Vinícius (yellow card) 90+5'	Report	Ødegaard (yellow card) 11', (goal) 22'; Le Normand (yellow card) 19'; Isak 54', 56'; Zubeldia (yellow card) 66'; Merino 69'; Gorosabel (yellow card) 86' (yellow-red card) 90+5'	Stadium: Santiago Bernabéu; Attendance: 64,012; Referee: Antonio Mateu Lahoz

13 February 2020 Semi-finals; First leg	Real Sociedad	2–1	Mirandés	San Sebastián
21:00 CET (UTC+1)	Oyarzabal 9' (pen.), (yellow card) 48'; Monreal (yellow card) 17'; Ødegaard 42'; Zaldúa (yellow card) 82'	Report	Matheus 39'; Kijera (yellow card) 45+2'	Stadium: Anoeta; Attendance: 35,194; Referee: Jesús Gil Manzano

4 March 2020 Semi-finals; Second leg	Mirandés	0–1 (1–3 agg.)	Real Sociedad	Miranda de Ebro
21:00 CET (UTC+1)	González (yellow card) 31'; Rey (yellow card) 72'; Barco (yellow card) 83'	Report	Monreal (yellow card) 32'; Oyarzabal 41' (pen.); Willian José (yellow card) 50'; Januzaj (yellow card) 72'; Zaldúa (yellow card) 90+1'	Stadium: Anduva; Attendance: 5,583; Referee: José María Sánchez Martínez

3 April 2021 Final	Athletic Bilbao	0–1	Real Sociedad	Seville
21:30 CEST (UTC+2)	D. García (yellow card) 35'; Martínez (yellow card) 62'	Report	Oyarzabal 63' (pen.); Merino (yellow card) 71'	Stadium: La Cartuja; Attendance: 0 Referee: Xavier Estrada Fernández
Note: Match originally scheduled for 18 April 2020 but postponed due to concerns over the coronavirus pandemic. It was played behind closed doors.

== Statistics ==
=== Squad statistics ===
- Includes the 2020 Copa del Rey Final, delayed until April 2021 and counted in the 2020–21 season in some resources – the match article has specifics of each player's involvement.

No.	Pos	Nat	Player	Total		La Liga		Copa del Rey	
No.	Pos	Nat	Player	Apps	Goals	Apps	Goals	Apps	Goals
Goalkeepers
1	GK	(Spain) ESP	Álex Remiro	32	0	25	0	7	0
13	GK	(Spain) ESP	Miguel Ángel Moyá	14	0	13	0	1	0
30	GK	(Spain) ESP	Andoni Zubiaurre	0	0	0	0	0	0
Defenders
2	DF	(Spain) ESP	Joseba Zaldúa	33	0	29+1	0	3	0
3	DF	(Spain) ESP	Diego Llorente	30	1	27+2	1	1	0
6	DF	(Spain) ESP	Aritz Elustondo	27	0	17+5	0	3+2	0
12	DF	(Spain) ESP	Aihen Muñoz	20	0	11+4	0	4+1	0
18	DF	(Spain) ESP	Andoni Gorosabel	19	0	8+6	0	5	0
20	DF	(Spain) ESP	Nacho Monreal	34	2	27+2	2	4+1	0
24	DF	(France) FRA	Robin Le Normand	39	2	25+6	1	8	1
26	DF	(Spain) ESP	Jon Pacheco	1	0	1	0	0	0
Midfielders
4	MF	(Spain) ESP	Asier Illarramendi	3	0	3	0	0	0
5	MF	(Spain) ESP	Igor Zubeldia	41	0	29+4	0	7+1	0
8	MF	(Spain) ESP	Mikel Merino	43	6	35+1	5	6+1	1
16	MF	(Spain) ESP	Ander Guevara	21	0	11+3	0	3+4	0
17	MF	(Spain) ESP	David Zurutuza	5	0	2+3	0	0	0
21 (Note: Ødegaard wore the #21 but left the club at the end of the regular season; Silva then joined the club and took the number, wearing it in the delayed cup final.)	MF	(Norway) NOR	Martin Ødegaard	36	7	29+2	4	5	3
23	MF	(Spain) ESP	Luca Sangalli	14	2	5+6	0	2+1	2
31	MF	(France) FRA	Naïs Djouahra	2	0	0+2	0	0	0
36	MF	(Spain) ESP	Martín Zubimendi	10	0	6+3	0	1	0
Forwards
7	FW	(Spain) ESP	Portu	41	7	25+10	7	2+4	0
9 (Note: Willian José wore the #9 but left the club at the end of the regular season; Fernández then joined the club and took the number, wearing it in the delayed cup final.)	FW	(Brazil) BRA	Willian José	41	11	24+13	11	2+2	0
10	FW	(Spain) ESP	Mikel Oyarzabal	45	13	36+1	10	7+1	3
11	FW	(Belgium) BEL	Adnan Januzaj	29	7	13+11	3	4+1	4
19	FW	(Sweden) SWE	Alexander Isak	45	16	14+23	9	6+2	7
22	FW	(Spain) ESP	Ander Barrenetxea	24	4	3+14	1	4+3	3
28	FW	(Spain) ESP	Roberto López	3	0	0+3	0	0	0
Players who made an appearance this season but left the club (including loaned out)
14	MF	(Spain) ESP	Rubén Pardo	1	1	0	0	1	1
15	DF	(France) FRA	Modibo Sagnan	1	0	0	0	1	0
20	DF	(Portugal) POR	Kévin Rodrigues	1	0	0+1	0	0	0
Players who joined the club after the end of the regular season (i.e. involved only in the delayed 2020 Copa del Rey Final)
21	MF	(Spain) ESP	David Silva	1	0	0	0	1	0
9	FW	(Spain) ESP	Carlos Fernández	1	0	0	0	0+1	0

=== Goalscorers ===
Rank	No.	Pos.	Player	La Liga	Copa del Rey	Total
1	19	FW	(Sweden) Alexander Isak	9	7	16
2	10	FW	(Spain) Mikel Oyarzabal	10	3	13
3	9	FW	(Brazil) Willian José	11	0	11
4	7	FW	(Spain) Portu	7	0	7
4	22	MF	(Norway) Martin Ødegaard	4	3	7
4	11	FW	(Belgium) Adnan Januzaj	3	4	7
7	8	MF	(Spain) Mikel Merino	5	1	6
8	22	FW	(Spain) Ander Barrenetxea	1	3	4
9	24	DF	(France) Robin Le Normand	1	1	2
9	20	DF	(Spain) Nacho Monreal	2	0	2
9	23	MF	(Spain) Luca Sangalli	0	2	2
12	3	DF	(Spain) Diego Llorente	1	0	1
12	14	MF	(Spain) Rubén Pardo	0	1	1
Own goals				1	0	1
TOTAL				55	25	80

=== Clean sheets ===
Rank	Name	La Liga	Copa del Rey	Total
1	(Spain) Álex Remiro	6	4	10
2	(Spain) Miguel Ángel Moyá	3	1	4
Total		9	5	14
