= Luca Sangalli =

Spanish footballer (born 1995)

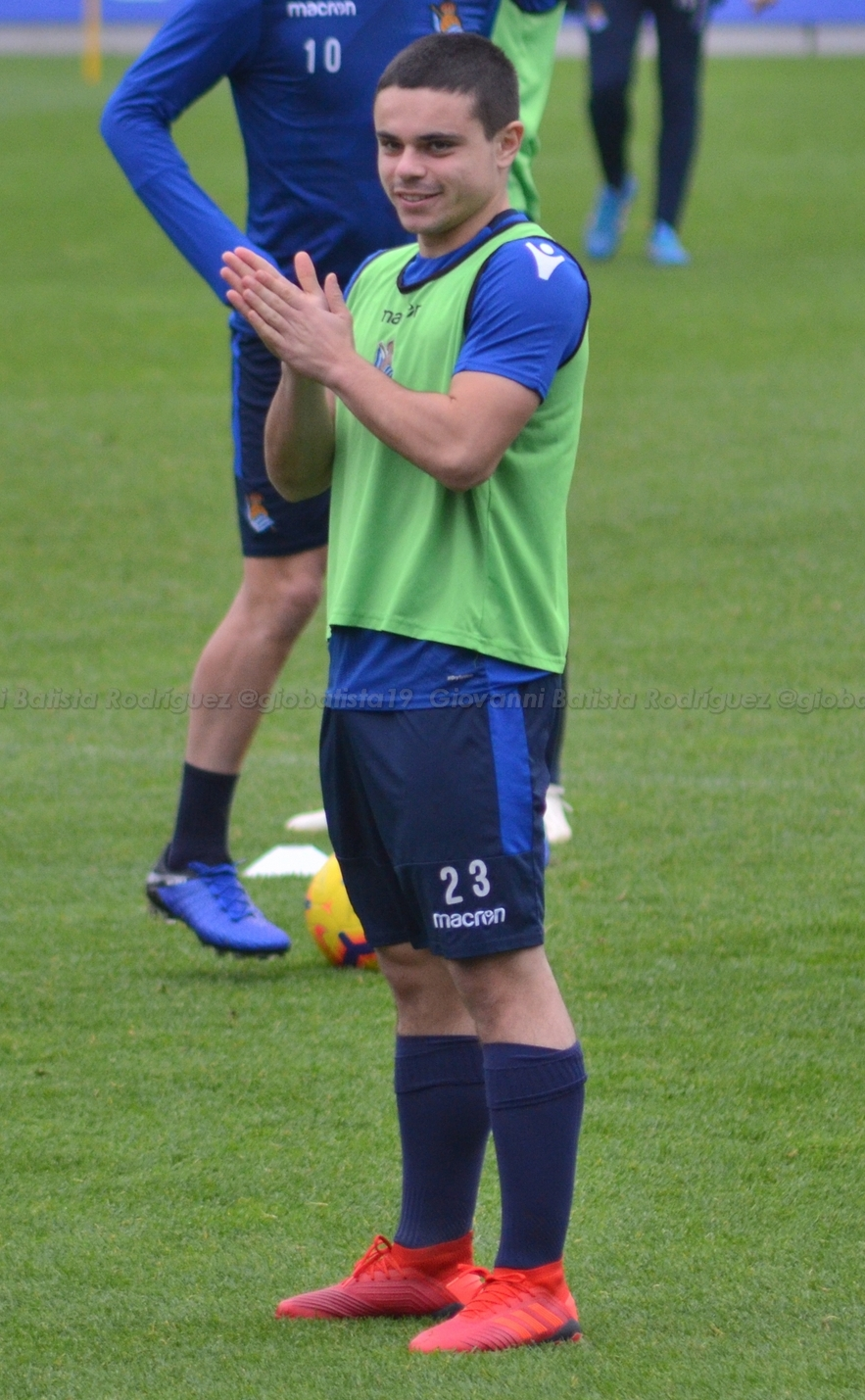
- Sangalli with Real Sociedad in 2018

Personal information
- Full name: Luca Sangalli Fuentes
- Date of birth: 10 February 1995 (age 31)
- Place of birth: San Sebastián, Spain
- Height: 1.67 m (5 ft 6 in)
- Position: Attacking midfielder

Team information
- Current team: Real Unión
- Number: 24

Youth career
- 2008–2014: Real Sociedad

Senior career*
Years	Team	Apps	(Gls)
2014–2022	Real Sociedad B	134	(14)
2018–2021	Real Sociedad	29	(1)
2022–2023	Cartagena	22	(0)
2023–2025	Málaga	25	(1)
2025–	Real Unión	22	(1)

International career^{‡}
2018–	Basque Country	1	(0)
- * Club domestic league appearances and goals as of 14 May 2026 ‡ National team caps and goals as of 12 October 2018

Luca Sangalli Fuentes (born 10 February 1995) is a Spanish professional footballer who plays as an attacking midfielder for Segunda Federación club Real Unión.

== Club career ==
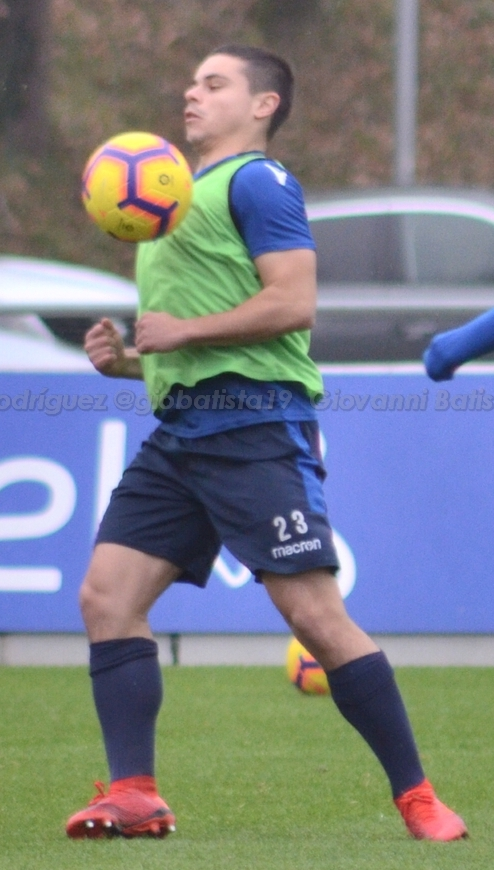
Sangalli training with Real Sociedad in 2018

Born in San Sebastián, Gipuzkoa, Basque Country, Sangalli represented hometown club Real Sociedad as a youth, (appearing in the UEFA Youth League in 2013). He was promoted to the reserves on 23 June 2014, and made his senior debut on 5 October by coming on as a late substitute for Eneko Capilla in a 1–1 Segunda División B away draw against CD Toledo.

Sangalli scored his first senior goals on 3 October 2015, netting a brace in a 3–3 draw at SD Amorebieta. A regular starter for the B-side, he renewed his contract until 2019 on 26 May 2017, but missed out the first months of the 2017–18 season due to injuries.

On 14 August 2018, Sangalli was definitely promoted to the main squad in La Liga and extended his contract until 2020. He made his debut in the category on 31 August, starting in a 2–1 away loss against SD Eibar.

On 5 October 2018, Sangalli scored his first professional goal, netting his team's second in a 3–1 away win against Athletic Bilbao in the Basque derby. At the end of the month, the 23-year-old suffered a minor stroke. He returned to action the following January against RCD Espanyol, and was given an ovation as he left the pitch.

Sangalli spent the entire 2020–21 season sidelined due to a knee injury. In July 2021, he was demoted back to the B-team after they achieved promotion to Segunda División.

On 14 June 2022, Sangalli signed a one-year contract with FC Cartagena also in the second level.

== International career ==
Uncapped by Spain at any level, Sangalli made his debut for the unofficial Basque side on 12 October 2018. He was one of several half-time substitutes as an experimental lineup won 4–2 against Venezuela at Mendizorrotza Stadium.

== Personal life ==
Sangalli's elder brother Marco is also a footballer. A winger, he was also groomed at Real Sociedad. Both are of Italian ancestry. Their paternal grandfather emigrated from Italy to San Sebastian in the mid-20th century and Luca is able to speak some Italian.

Sangalli has a degree in Engineering. His maternal uncle is Miguel Fuentes, former Real Sociedad player and president.

== Career statistics ==
=== Club ===
As of match played 10 March 2020

Appearances and goals by club, season and competition
Club	Season	League			National Cup		Other		Total	
Club	Season	Division	Apps	Goals	Apps	Goals	Apps	Goals	Apps	Goals
Real Sociedad B	2014–15	Segunda División B	28	0	—		—		28	0
Real Sociedad B	2015–16	Segunda División B	30	5	—		—		30	5
Real Sociedad B	2016–17	Segunda División B	38	3	—		—		38	3
Real Sociedad B	2017–18	Segunda División B	18	5	—		1 (Note: Appearance(s) in Promotion Playoffs)	0	19	5
Real Sociedad B	Total		114	13	0	0	1	0	115	14
Real Sociedad	2018–19	La Liga	18	1	1	0	—		19	1
Real Sociedad	2019–20	La Liga	11	0	3	2	—		14	2
Real Sociedad	2020–21	La Liga	0	0	0	0	—		0	0
Real Sociedad	Total		29	1	4	2	0	0	33	3
Career total			143	14	4	2	1	0	148	17
