= Arkaitz Mariezkurrena =

Spanish footballer (born 2005)

Personal information
- Full name: Arkaitz Mariezkurrena Etxezarreta
- Date of birth: 5 April 2005 (age 21)
- Place of birth: Astigarraga, Spain
- Height: 1.81 m (5 ft 11 in)
- Position: Winger

Team information
- Current team: Real Sociedad B
- Number: 10

Youth career
- 2016–2023: Real Sociedad

Senior career*
Years	Team	Apps	(Gls)
2022–2024	Real Sociedad C	24	(8)
2023–	Real Sociedad B	88	(9)
2024–	Real Sociedad	10	(2)
- * Club domestic league appearances and goals as of 9 June 2026

Arkaitz Mariezkurrena Etxezarreta (born 5 April 2005) is a Spanish footballer who plays mainly as a left winger for Real Sociedad B.

== Club career ==
Born in Astigarraga, Gipuzkoa, Basque Country, Mariezkurrena joined Real Sociedad's youth sides in 2016, aged 11. He made his senior debut with the C-team on 11 December 2022, coming on as a second-half substitute in a 3–1 Segunda Federación home loss to Sestao River Club.

Mariezkurrena scored his first senior goal on 29 January 2023, netting the C's third in a 3–1 home win over CD Alfaro. He started to feature with the reserves during the 2023–24 season, before making his first team debut on 21 November 2024, replacing fellow youth graduate Pablo Marín in a 5–0 away routing of FC Jove Español San Vicente, for the campaign's Copa del Rey.

Mariezkurrena made his professional – and La Liga – debut on 2 March 2025, replacing Ander Barrenetxea in a 4–0 away loss to FC Barcelona.

== International career ==
In 2022, Mariezkurrena received call-ups to the Spain under-17 and under-18 teams.

== Career statistics ==
As of match played 20 December 2025

Appearances and goals by club, season and competition
Club	Season	League			Cup		Europe		Other		Total	
Club	Season	Division	Apps	Goals	Apps	Goals	Apps	Goals	Apps	Goals	Apps	Goals
Real Sociedad C	2022–23	Segunda Federación	10	1	—		—		—		10	1
Real Sociedad C	2023–24	Segunda Federación	14	7	—		—		—		14	7
Real Sociedad C	Total		24	8	—		—		—		24	8
Real Sociedad B	2023–24	Primera Federación	23	0	—		—		—		23	0
Real Sociedad B	2024–25	Primera Federación	26	6	—		—		3 (Note: Appearances in 2025 Primera Federación play-offs)	1	29	7
Real Sociedad B	2025–26	Segunda División	18	1	—		—		1 (Note: Appearance in Premier League Cup)	0	19	1
Real Sociedad B	Total		67	7	—		—		4	1	71	8
Real Sociedad	2024–25	La Liga	9	2	3	0	0	0	—		12	2
Real Sociedad	2025–26	La Liga	1	0	0	0	—		—		1	0
Real Sociedad	Total		10	2	3	0	0	0	—		13	2
Career total			101	17	3	0	0	0	4	1	108	18
