= 2024–25 Real Sociedad season =

Real Sociedad
2024–25 season
- President: Jokin Aperribay
- Head coach: Imanol Alguacil
- Stadium: Reale Arena
- La Liga: 11th
- Copa del Rey: Semi-finals
- UEFA Europa League: Round of 16
- Top goalscorer: League: Mikel Oyarzabal (9); All: Mikel Oyarzabal (18)
- Highest home attendance: 37,370 vs Real Madrid
- Lowest home attendance: 20,855 vs Villarreal
- Average home league attendance: 29,877
- Biggest win: Jove Español 0–5 Real Sociedad
- Biggest defeat: Barcelona 4–0 Real Sociedad; Atlético Madrid 4–0 Real Sociedad
Home colours	Away colours	Third colours

The 2024–25 season was the 115th season in the history of Real Sociedad, and the club's 15th consecutive season in La Liga. In addition to the domestic league, the club participated in the Copa del Rey and the UEFA Europa League.

On 24 April 2025, head coach Imanol Alguacil confirmed that he would step down at the end of the season, concluding a spell of over six years in charge of the club.

== Players ==
=== First-team squad ===
As of 23 January 2025

Note: Flags indicate national team as defined under FIFA eligibility rules; some limited exceptions apply. Players may hold more than one non-FIFA nationality.

No.	Pos.	Nation	Player
1	GK	ESP	Álex Remiro
2	DF	ESP	Álvaro Odriozola
3	DF	ESP	Aihen Muñoz
4	MF	ESP	Martín Zubimendi
5	DF	ESP	Igor Zubeldia (3rd captain)
6	DF	ESP	Aritz Elustondo (vice-captain)
7	FW	ESP	Ander Barrenetxea
8	MF	RUS	Arsen Zakharyan
9	FW	ISL	Orri Óskarsson
10	FW	ESP	Mikel Oyarzabal (captain)
11	FW	SUR	Sheraldo Becker
12	DF	ESP	Javi López

No.	Pos.	Nation	Player
13	GK	ESP	Unai Marrero
14	FW	JPN	Takefusa Kubo
16	MF	ESP	Jon Ander Olasagasti
17	FW	ESP	Sergio Gómez
18	DF	MLI	Hamari Traoré
20	DF	ESP	Jon Pacheco
21	DF	MAR	Nayef Aguerd (on loan from West Ham United)
22	MF	ESP	Beñat Turrientes
23	MF	ESP	Brais Méndez
24	MF	CRO	Luka Sučić
27	DF	VEN	Jon Aramburu
28	MF	ESP	Pablo Marín

=== Reserve team ===
Note: Flags indicate national team as defined under FIFA eligibility rules; some limited exceptions apply. Players may hold more than one non-FIFA nationality.

No.	Pos.	Nation	Player
30	FW	ESP	Mikel Goti
31	DF	ESP	Jon Martín
32	GK	ESP	Aitor Fraga
33	MF	ESP	Jon Balda
34	DF	ESP	Iñaki Rupérez
35	GK	ESP	Egoitz Arana

No.	Pos.	Nation	Player
37	DF	ESP	Luken Beitia
40	FW	ESP	Arkaitz Mariezkurrena
41	FW	ESP	Alex Marchal
44	MF	ESP	Mikel Rodríguez
45	FW	ESP	Ekain Orobengoa

=== Out on loan ===
Note: Flags indicate national team as defined under FIFA eligibility rules; some limited exceptions apply. Players may hold more than one non-FIFA nationality.

No.	Pos.	Nation	Player
—	MF	ESP	Alberto Dadie (at Mirandés until 30 June 2025)
—	MF	ESP	Jon Gorrotxategi (at Mirandés until 30 June 2025)
—	MF	ESP	Urko González de Zárate (at Espanyol until 30 June 2025)
—	FW	ESP	Carlos Fernández (at Cádiz until 30 June 2025)

No.	Pos.	Nation	Player
—	FW	ESP	Jon Karrikaburu (at Racing Santander until 30 June 2025)
—	FW	ESP	Jon Magunazelaia (at Córdoba until 30 June 2025)
—	FW	NGR	Umar Sadiq (at Valencia until 30 June 2025)

== Transfers ==
=== In ===
Pos.	Player	Transferred from	Fee	Date	Source
MF	(Spain) Robert Navarro	(Spain) Cádiz	Loan return	30 June 2024	
DF	(Spain) Diego Rico	(Spain) Getafe	Loan return	30 June 2024	
MF	(Spain) Álex Sola	(Spain) Alavés	Loan return	30 June 2024	
MF	(Spain) Roberto López	(Spain) Tenerife	Loan return	30 June 2024	
FW	(Spain) Jon Karrikaburu	FC Andorra	Loan return	30 June 2024	
DF	(Spain) Sergio Gómez	(England) Manchester City	€10,000,000	12 July 2024	
DF	(Spain) Javi López	(Spain) Alavés	€6,500,000	21 July 2024	
MF	(Croatia) Luka Sučić	(Austria) Red Bull Salzburg	€10,000,000	2 August 2024	
DF	(Morocco) Nayef Aguerd	(England) West Ham United	Loan	30 August 2024	
FW	(Iceland) Orri Óskarsson	(Denmark) Copenhagen	€20,000,000	30 August 2024	

=== Out ===
Pos.	Player	Transferred to	Fee	Date	Source
FW	(Portugal) André Silva	(Germany) RB Leipzig	End of loan	30 June 2024	
DF	(Spain) Javi Galán	(Spain) Atlético Madrid	End of loan	30 June 2024	
DF	(Scotland) Kieran Tierney	(England) Arsenal	End of loan	30 June 2024	
FW	(Spain) Roberto López	(Spain) Leganés	Undisclosed	10 July 2024	
MF	(Spain) Álex Sola	(Spain) Getafe	Undisclosed	15 July 2024	
DF	(Spain) Diego Rico	(Spain) Getafe	€1,500,000	16 July 2024	
FW	(Spain) Jon Karrikaburu	(Spain) Racing Santander	Loan	20 July 2024	
DF	(Spain) Robin Le Normand	(Spain) Atlético Madrid	€34,500,000	27 July 2024	
MF	(Spain) Mikel Merino	(England) Arsenal	€32,500,000	27 August 2024	
MF	(Spain) Robert Navarro	(Spain) Mallorca	Loan	29 August 2024	
FW	(Spain) Carlos Fernández	(Spain) Cádiz	Loan	30 August 2024	
FW	(Spain) Jon Magunazelaia	(Spain) Córdoba	Loan	1 January 2025	
FW	(Nigeria) Umar Sadiq	(Spain) Valencia	Loan	4 January 2025	
MF	(Spain) Urko González de Zárate	(Spain) Espanyol	Loan	23 January 2025	

== Friendlies ==
=== Pre-season ===
20 July 2024 XXII Trofeo Villa de Laguardia	Real Sociedad	1–1 (5–6 p)	Alavés	Laguardia
18:00 CEST (UTC+2)	Méndez 30'	Report	Kike 12'; Doumbia (yellow card) 69'	Stadium: Campo de Futbol El Prao; Referee: Aimar Velasco Arbaiza
	Penalties
	Sadiq (penalty missed); Olasagasti (penalty scored); Goti (penalty scored); Rupérez (penalty missed); Dadie (penalty scored); Odriozola (penalty missed); Gorrotxategi (penalty scored); S. Gómez (penalty scored); Ochieng (penalty missed)		(penalty scored) Panichelli; (penalty scored) Rebbach; (penalty missed) Benavídez; (penalty missed) Maraš; (penalty scored) Rioja; (penalty missed) Owono; (penalty scored) Doumbia; (penalty scored) Parada; (penalty scored) Mahmoud

25 July 2024 Friendly	Gamba Osaka	0–1	Real Sociedad	Suita, Japan
19:00 JST (UTC+9)		Report	Elustondo 64'; J. Gómez (yellow card) 71'	Stadium: Suita City Football Stadium; Attendance: 20,861; Referee: Takafumi Mikuriya (Japan)

31 July 2024 Friendly	Real Sociedad	1–2	Osasuna	San Sebastián
19:00 CEST (UTC+2)	González de Zárate (yellow card) 38'; Goti 54'	Report	Budimir 49', 64'	Stadium: Instalaciones de Zubieta; Referee: Gorka Etayo Herrera

3 August 2024 Friendly	Rennes	2–0	Real Sociedad	Rennes, France
19:00 CEST (UTC+2)	Grønbæk 22'; Seidu (yellow card) 45'; Gouiri 67'; Wooh (yellow card) 90+1'	Report	Olasagasti (yellow card) 34'	Stadium: Roazhon Park; Attendance: 14,643; Referee: Maxime Jamet (France)

9 August 2024 Friendly	Union Berlin	1–1	Real Sociedad	Berlin, Germany
19:00 CEST (UTC+2)	Tousart (yellow card) 39'; Gosens 42'	Report	González de Zárate (yellow card) 35'; Oyarzabal 82'	Stadium: Stadion An der Alten Försterei; Attendance: 19,265; Referee: Max Burda (Germany)

== Competitions ==
=== Overall record ===
Competition	First match	Last match	Starting round	Final position	Record							
Competition	First match	Last match	Starting round	Final position	Pld	W	D	L	GF	GA	GD	Win %
La Liga	18 August 2024	24 May 2025	Matchday 1	11th	38	13	7	18	35	46	−11	34.21
Copa del Rey	21 November 2024	1 April 2025	First round	Semi-finals	7	5	1	1	17	6	+11	71.43
UEFA Europa League	25 September 2024	13 March 2025	League phase	Round of 16	12	6	2	4	22	17	+5	50.00
Total					57	24	10	23	74	69	+5	42.11

Source: Soccerway

=== La Liga ===
==== League table ====
Pos	Team	Pld	W	D	L	GF	GA	GD	Pts
9	Osasuna	38	12	16	10	48	52	−4	52 (Note: Rayo Vallecano finished ahead of Osasuna on head-to-head points: Rayo Vallecano 3–1 Osasuna, Osasuna 1–1 Rayo Vallecano.)
10	Mallorca	38	13	9	16	35	44	−9	48
11	Real Sociedad	38	13	7	18	35	46	−11	46 (Note: Real Sociedad finished ahead of Valencia on head-to-head goal difference: Real Sociedad 3–0 Valencia, Valencia 1–0 Real Sociedad.)
12	Valencia	38	11	13	14	44	54	−10	46
13	Getafe	38	11	9	18	34	39	−5	42 (Note: Head-to-head points: Getafe 9, Espanyol 9, Alavés 0.)

Source: LaLiga EA Sports
Rules for classification: 1) Points; 2) Head-to-head points; 3) Head-to-head goal difference; 4) Goal difference; 5) Goals scored; 6) Fair-play points
(Note: Head-to-head record is used only after all the matches between the teams in question have been played)

==== Results summary ====
Overall								Home						Away					
Pld	W	D	L	GF	GA	GD	Pts	W	D	L	GF	GA	GD	W	D	L	GF	GA	GD
38	13	7	18	35	46	−11	46	8	3	8	20	20	0	5	4	10	15	26	−11

Source: La Liga

==== Results by round ====
Round	1	2	3	4	5	6	7	8	9	10	11	12	13	14	15	16	17	18	19	20	21	22	23	24	25	26	27	28	29	30	31	32	33	34	35	36	37	38
Ground	H	A	H	A	H	A	A	H	H	A	H	A	H	A	H	A	H	A	H	A	H	A	H	A	H	A	H	A	H	A	H	A	A	H	A	H	H	A
Result	L	W	L	D	L	D	L	W	D	W	L	W	W	L	W	W	D	L	W	L	L	L	W	L	W	L	L	D	W	W	L	D	L	D	L	L	W	L
Position	17	9	13	13	16	16	16	14	15	11	12	11	8	10	9	6	7	7	7	7	9	11	7	11	9	9	11	12	10	9	9	9	10	11	12	12	11	11

Source: La Liga
A = Away; H = Home; W = Win; D = Draw; L = Loss

==== Matches ====
The league schedule was released on 18 June 2024.

18 August 2024 1	Real Sociedad	1–2	Rayo Vallecano	San Sebastián
19:00 CEST (UTC+2)	González de Zárate (yellow card) 27'; Aramburu (yellow card) 90+4'; Zubimendi 90+8'	Report	López (yellow card) 32'; Lejeune (yellow card) 53'; Nteka (yellow card) 56'; Embarba (yellow card) 57'; De Frutos 67'; Camello 84'	Stadium: Reale Arena; Attendance: 31,763; Referee: Alejandro Hernández Hernández

24 August 2024 2	Espanyol	0–1	Real Sociedad	Cornellà de Llobregat
21:30 CEST (UTC+2)	Véliz (yellow card) 52'; Kumbulla (yellow card) 90+7'	Report	Turrientes (yellow card) 51'; Oyarzabal (yellow card) 57'; Kubo 80'	Stadium: Stage Front Stadium; Attendance: 20,900; Referee: Mario Melero López

28 August 2024 3	Real Sociedad	1–2	Alavés	San Sebastián
21:30 CEST (UTC+2)	Pacheco (yellow card) 16'; Oyarzabal (red card) 29'; Méndez 32'; Zubeldia (yellow card) 36'; Kubo (yellow card) 90+7'; Martín (yellow card) 90+7'	Report	Villalibre 45+5' (pen.); Stoichkov (yellow card) 48'; Abde (yellow card) 51'; Martínez 77'; Sivera (yellow card) 90'; Sánchez (yellow card) 90+7'	Stadium: Reale Arena; Attendance: 32,220; Referee: José María Sánchez Martínez

1 September 2024 4	Getafe	0–0	Real Sociedad	Getafe
19:15 CEST (UTC+2)	Iglesias (yellow card) 22'	Report	Muñoz (yellow card) 90+4'	Stadium: Coliseum; Attendance: 10,929; Referee: José Luis Munuera Montero

14 September 2024 5	Real Sociedad	0–2	Real Madrid	San Sebastián
21:00 CEST (UTC+2)	Sadiq (yellow card) 17'; Aramburu (yellow card) 28'; Pacheco (yellow card) 82'; Barrenetxea (yellow card) 84'	Report	Vinícius 58' (pen.); Mbappé 75' (pen.); Modrić (yellow card) 79'	Stadium: Reale Arena; Attendance: 37,370; Referee: Juan Martínez Munuera

17 September 2024 7	Mallorca	1–0	Real Sociedad	Palma
19:00 CEST (UTC+2)	Abdón 36' (pen.), (yellow card) 60'	Report	Turrientes (yellow card) 54'	Stadium: Estadi Mallorca Son Moix; Attendance: 17,132; Referee: Adrián Cordero Vega
Note: The match was brought forward due to Real Sociedad's participation in the UEFA Europa League league phase.

21 September 2024 6	Valladolid	0–0	Real Sociedad	Valladolid
14:00 CEST (UTC+2)	Jurić (yellow card) 35'; Pérez (yellow card) 55'; Rosa (yellow card) 58'; Latasa (yellow card) 72'	Report	Aguerd (yellow card) 1'; Aramburu (yellow card) 53'; Zubeldia (yellow card) 90+2'; Zubimendi (yellow card) 90+4'	Stadium: José Zorrilla; Attendance: 21,171; Referee: Guillermo Cuadra Fernández

28 September 2024 8	Real Sociedad	3–0	Valencia	San Sebastián
18:30 CEST (UTC+2)	Kubo 8'; Óskarsson 80', 90+2'	Report		Stadium: Reale Arena; Attendance: 32,332; Referee: Javier Alberola Rojas

6 October 2024 9	Real Sociedad	1–1	Atlético Madrid	San Sebastián
21:00 CEST (UTC+2)	Sučić 84'	Report	Alvarez 1'; Lenglet (yellow card) 55'; Galán (yellow card) 80'	Stadium: Reale Arena; Attendance: 31,983; Referee: Isidro Díaz de Mera Escuderos

19 October 2024 10	Girona	0–1	Real Sociedad	Girona
18:30 CEST (UTC+2)	Martínez (yellow card) 30'; Herrera (yellow card) 74'	Report	Oyarzabal 44'; Méndez (yellow card) 55'	Stadium: Montilivi; Attendance: 12,602; Referee: César Soto Grado

27 October 2024 11	Real Sociedad	0–2	Osasuna	San Sebastián
21:00 CET (UTC+1)	Zubimendi (yellow card) 73'; Odriozola (yellow card) 84'; Méndez (yellow card) 90+3'	Report	Oroz (yellow card) 16'; Torró 23'; Budimir 34'; Herrera (yellow card) 45+3'; Zaragoza (yellow card) 76'; Bretones (yellow card) 90+5'	Stadium: Reale Arena; Attendance: 31,279; Referee: Juan Luis Pulido Santana

3 November 2024 12	Sevilla	0–2	Real Sociedad	Seville
18:30 CET (UTC+1)	Romero (yellow card) 11'; Marcão (yellow card) 66'	Report	Kubo 34'; Oyarzabal 68' (pen.); Gómez (yellow card) 75'	Stadium: Ramón Sánchez Pizjuán; Attendance: 37,619; Referee: Alejandro Muñiz Ruiz

10 November 2024 13	Real Sociedad	1–0	Barcelona	San Sebastián
21:00 CET (UTC+1)	Aramburu (yellow card) 20'; Becker 33'; Méndez (yellow card) 82'; Zubeldia (yellow card) 87'	Report	Martínez (yellow card) 53'	Stadium: Reale Arena; Attendance: 36,194; Referee: Guillermo Cuadra Fernández

24 November 2024 14	Athletic Bilbao	1–0	Real Sociedad	Bilbao
21:00 CET (UTC+1)	Sancet 26'; Prados (yellow card) 41'; Ruiz de Galarreta (yellow card) 76'; Berchiche (yellow card) 90+2'	Report	Zubeldia (yellow card) 21'; López (yellow card) 53'; Aguerd (yellow card) 90+1'; Sučić (yellow card) 90+5'	Stadium: San Mamés; Attendance: 50,719; Referee: Jesús Gil Manzano

1 December 2024 15	Real Sociedad	2–0	Real Betis	San Sebastián
21:00 CET (UTC+1)	Llorente 14' (o.g.); Oyarzabal 31' (pen.), (yellow card) 45+2'; Aguerd (yellow card) 45+6'; Barrenetxea (yellow card) 47'	Report	Bartra (yellow card) 45+2'; Ávila (yellow card) 79'	Stadium: Reale Arena; Attendance: 28,119; Referee: Francisco José Hernández Maeso

8 December 2024 16	Leganés	0–3	Real Sociedad	Leganés
14:00 CET (UTC+1)	Rosier (yellow card) 70'; Neyou (yellow card) 75'	Report	Méndez 14', (yellow card) 70'; Muñoz (yellow card) 27'; Barrenetxea 78'; Oyarzabal 90+2'	Stadium: Butarque; Attendance: 11,312; Referee: Pablo González Fuertes

15 December 2024 17	Real Sociedad	0–0	Las Palmas	San Sebastián
18:30 CET (UTC+1)	Kubo (yellow card) 39'; Barrenetxea (yellow card) 73'	Report	Mata (yellow card) 57'; Sandro (yellow card) 74'; Benito (yellow card) 90+1'	Stadium: Reale Arena; Attendance: 30,775; Referee: Mario Melero López

21 December 2024 18	Celta Vigo	2–0	Real Sociedad	Vigo
16:15 CET (UTC+1)	Durán 40', 45+1', (yellow card) 70'; Rodríguez (yellow card) 61'; Starfelt (yellow card) 69'	Report	Oyarzabal (yellow card) 20'; Turrientes (yellow card) 28'; Becker (yellow card) 56'; Zubeldia (yellow card) 71'; Kubo (yellow card) 83'	Stadium: Balaídos; Attendance: 22,956; Referee: Mateo Busquets Ferrer

13 January 2025 19	Real Sociedad	1–0	Villarreal	San Sebastián
21:00 CET (UTC+1)	Kubo 51'; Aramburu (yellow card) 70'; Barrenetxea (yellow card) 90'; Muñoz (yellow card) 90+1'; Zubimendi (yellow card) 90+5'	Report	Baena (yellow card) 65'; Foyth (yellow card) 78'	Stadium: Reale Arena; Attendance: 20,855; Referee: César Soto Grado

19 January 2025 20	Valencia	1–0	Real Sociedad	Valencia
21:00 CET (UTC+1)	Duro 26', (yellow card) 87'; Mosquera (yellow card) 90+4'; Foulquier (yellow card) 90+6'	Report	Pacheco (yellow card) 42'; López (yellow card) 49'; Gómez (yellow card) 89'; Zubimendi (yellow card) 90+4'	Stadium: Mestalla; Attendance: 40,791; Referee: Víctor García Verdura

26 January 2025 21	Real Sociedad	0–3	Getafe	San Sebastián
16:15 CET (UTC+1)	Turrientes (yellow card) 15'; Kubo (yellow card) 90+5'; Aramburu (yellow card) 90+6'	Report	Milla (yellow card) 25'; Yıldırım (yellow card) 45+1'; Alderete (yellow card) 54'; Uche 72'; Pérez 74', 85'; Santiago (yellow card) 90'; Berrocal (yellow card) 90+2'; Coba (yellow card) 90+6'	Stadium: Reale Arena; Attendance: 30,004; Referee: Guillermo Cuadra Fernández

2 February 2025 22	Osasuna	2–1	Real Sociedad	Pamplona
18:30 CET (UTC+1)	Torró (yellow card) 16'; Budimir 34', 74', (yellow card) 63'; Herrera (yellow card) 70'	Report	Zubeldia (yellow card) 39'; Olasagasti (yellow card) 59'; Óskarsson 90+4'; Sučić (yellow card) 90+6'	Stadium: El Sadar; Attendance: 21,678; Referee: Miguel Ángel Ortiz Arias

9 February 2025 23	Real Sociedad	2–1	Espanyol	San Sebastián
18:30 CET (UTC+1)	Becker 1'; Aguerd (yellow card) 51'; Méndez 84'	Report	Aguado (yellow card) 40'; Puado 53' (pen.); Cabrera (yellow card) 90+2'	Stadium: Reale Arena; Attendance: 29,478; Referee: Javier Alberola Rojas

16 February 2025 24	Real Betis	3–0	Real Sociedad	Seville
21:00 CET (UTC+1)	Lo Celso (penalty missed) 33'; Antony 51'; Roca 64', 69'	Report	Aramburu (yellow card) 6'; Zubeldia (red card) 20'; Muñoz (yellow card) 31'; Becker (red card) 75'	Stadium: Benito Villamarín; Attendance: 48,758; Referee: Jesús Gil Manzano

23 February 2025 25	Real Sociedad	3–0	Leganés	San Sebastián
21:00 CET (UTC+1)	Zakharyan 12'; Kubo 48', (yellow card) 61'; Aguerd (yellow card) 58'; Olasagasti (yellow card) 74', (goal) 80'	Report	Rosier (yellow card) 41'; Tapia (yellow card) 61'; Óscar (yellow card) 63'	Stadium: Reale Arena; Attendance: 22,533; Referee: Francisco José Hernández Maeso

2 March 2025 26	Barcelona	4–0	Real Sociedad	Barcelona
16:15 CET (UTC+1)	Martín 25'; Casadó 29'; Araújo 56'; Lewandowski 60'	Report	Elustondo (red card) 17'	Stadium: Estadi Olímpic Lluís Companys; Attendance: 46,234; Referee: Alejandro Quintero González

9 March 2025 27	Real Sociedad	0–1	Sevilla	San Sebastián
20:00 CET (UTC+1)	Marín (yellow card) 80'; Traoré (yellow card) 90+5'	Report	Ejuke 46'; Sambi Lokonga (yellow card) 90+1'	Stadium: Reale Arena; Attendance: 25,478; Referee: Víctor García Verdura

16 March 2025 28	Rayo Vallecano	2–2	Real Sociedad	Madrid
18:30 CET (UTC+1)	Guardiola (yellow card) 40'; Trejo 58'; Díaz 72'; Lejeune (yellow card) 74'; Espino (yellow card) 90+2'	Report	López (yellow card) 11'; Zubimendi 20'; Barrenetxea (yellow card) 60'; Mariezkurrena 80'	Stadium: Vallecas; Attendance: 12,364; Referee: Alejandro Muñiz Ruiz

29 March 2025 29	Real Sociedad	2–1	Valladolid	San Sebastián
14:00 CET (UTC+1)	Oyarzabal 23'; Marín (yellow card) 58'; Gómez 68', (yellow card) 90+7'	Report	Sánchez (yellow card) 48'; Amallah (yellow card) 51'; Torres (yellow card) 68'; Latasa 90+3'	Stadium: Reale Arena; Attendance: 28,151; Referee: Adrián Cordero Vega

6 April 2025 30	Las Palmas	1–3	Real Sociedad	Las Palmas
13:00 WEST (UTC+1)	McBurnie 60'	Report	Oyarzabal 5'; López (yellow card) 45+2'; Gómez 56'; Aramburu 68'; Martín (yellow card) 76'	Stadium: Estadio Gran Canaria; Attendance: 22,616; Referee: Miguel Ángel Ortiz Arias

12 April 2025 31	Real Sociedad	0–2	Mallorca	San Sebastián
14:00 CEST (UTC+2)	Oyarzabal (yellow card) 71'; Zubimendi (yellow card) 90'; Elustondo (yellow card) 90+2'	Report	Larin 20'; Darder 47'; Maffeo (yellow card) 90+5'	Stadium: Reale Arena; Attendance: 29,181; Referee: José Luis Montero

20 April 2025 32	Villarreal	2–2	Real Sociedad	Villarreal
16:15 CEST (UTC+2)	Pino 7', (yellow card) 41'; Pérez 60'; Cardona (yellow card) 66'; Femenía (yellow card) 90+8'; Pépé (yellow card) 90+8'	Report	Oyarzabal 19' (pen.), 49'; Gómez (yellow card) 77'	Stadium: Estadio de la Cerámica; Attendance: 17,620; Referee: Guillermo Cuadra Fernández

23 April 2025 33	Alavés	1–0	Real Sociedad	Vitoria-Gasteiz
21:30 CEST (UTC+2)	Vicente (yellow card) 36'; Conechny (yellow card) 47'; Tenaglia 65'; Sivera (yellow card) 90+1'; Blanco (yellow card) 90+2'	Report	Aramburu (yellow card) 30'; Mariezkurrena (yellow card) 80'; Óskarsson (yellow card) 90+1'; Sučić (yellow card) 90+2'; Elustondo (yellow card) 90+5'	Stadium: Mendizorrotza; Attendance: 17,049; Referee: Mateo Busquets Ferrer

4 May 2025 34	Real Sociedad	0–0	Athletic Bilbao	San Sebastián
21:00 CEST (UTC+2)	Marín (yellow card) 58'	Report	Berenguer (yellow card) 44'; Gorosabel (yellow card) 78'	Stadium: Reale Arena; Attendance: 36,058; Referee: César Soto Grado

10 May 2025 35	Atlético Madrid	4–0	Real Sociedad	Madrid
21:00 CEST (UTC+2)	Sørloth 7', 10', 11', 30'	Report	Barrenetxea (yellow card) 54'	Stadium: Riyadh Air Metropolitano; Attendance: 59,612; Referee: José María Sánchez Martínez

13 May 2025 36	Real Sociedad	0–1	Celta Vigo	San Sebastián
20:00 CEST (UTC+2)	Muñoz (yellow card) 63'; Zubimendi (yellow card) 87'; Sučić (yellow card) 90+6'	Report	Alfon 44'; Moriba (yellow card) 71'	Stadium: Reale Arena; Attendance: 25,124; Referee: Víctor García Verdura

18 May 2025 37	Real Sociedad	3–2	Girona	San Sebastián
19:00 CEST (UTC+2)	Marín 5'; Oyarzabal 20' (pen.); Traoré (yellow card) 62'; Mariezkurrena 90+1'	Report	Stuani 10', (yellow card) 62'; Solís (yellow card) 49'; Portu 77'; Martínez (yellow card) 90+6'	Stadium: Reale Arena; Attendance: 28,315; Referee: Miguel Ángel Ortiz Arias

24 May 2025 38	Real Madrid	2–0	Real Sociedad	Madrid
16:15 CEST (UTC+2)	Mbappé (penalty missed) 38', 38', 83'	Report		Stadium: Santiago Bernabéu; Attendance: 73,186; Referee: Mario Melero López

=== Copa del Rey ===
21 November 2024 First round	Jove Español	0–5	Real Sociedad	Alicante
21:00 CET (UTC+1)		Report	Barrenetxea 12', 15'; Gómez 38'; Magunazelaia 44'; Goti 78'	Stadium: José Rico Pérez; Attendance: 6,000; Referee: Alejandro Quintero González
Note: The match was played at the José Rico Pérez in Alicante, instead of Jove Español's regular stadium, Ciudad Deportiva in San Vicente del Raspeig, as it did not meet the broadcasting requirements. The match was originally scheduled for 31 October 2024, but was postponed due to the 2024 Spanish floods.

5 December 2024 Second round	Conquense	0–1 (a.e.t.)	Real Sociedad	Cuenca
21:00 CET (UTC+1)	Monterde (yellow card) 76'; Sina (yellow card) 82'; Álvarez (yellow card) 99'; Inglés (yellow card) 101'; Caballero (yellow card) 112'; Yoshimura (yellow card) 118'	Report	Méndez 92'	Stadium: La Fuensanta; Attendance: 6,000; Referee: Víctor García Verdura

5 January 2025 Round of 32	Ponferradina	0–2	Real Sociedad	Ponferrada
15:30 CET (UTC+1)	Lancho (yellow card) 45'	Report	Oyarzabal 54'; Méndez 69'	Stadium: El Toralín; Attendance: 8,064; Referee: Jesús Gil Manzano

16 January 2025 Round of 16	Real Sociedad	3–1	Rayo Vallecano	San Sebastián
19:30 CET (UTC+1)	Oyarzabal 23'; Zubimendi (yellow card) 43'; Olasagasti 45+1'; Gómez 79'	Report	Espino (yellow card) 17' (yellow-red card) 77'; Trejo 45+7' (pen.); Lejeune (yellow card) 59'; Palazón (yellow card) 81'	Stadium: Reale Arena; Attendance: 27,816; Referee: Francisco José Hernández Maeso

6 February 2025 Quarter-finals	Real Sociedad	2–0	Osasuna	San Sebastián
19:30 CET (UTC+1)	Barrenetxea 21'; Méndez 31'; Oyarzabal (yellow card) 45+1'; Muñoz (yellow card) 87'; Aguerd (yellow card) 90+3'	Report	Catena (red card) 35'; Moncayola (yellow card) 45+5'; Herrera (yellow card) 45+6'; Ibáñez (yellow card) 77'; Areso (yellow card) 80'	Stadium: Reale Arena; Attendance: 34,658; Referee: Mario Melero López

26 February 2025 Semi-finals; First leg	Real Sociedad	0–1	Real Madrid	San Sebastián
21:30 CET (UTC+1)		Report	Endrick 19'; Asencio (yellow card) 45+1'; Vázquez (yellow card) 86'	Stadium: Reale Arena; Attendance: 37,373; Referee: José María Sánchez Martínez

1 April 2025 Semi-finals; Second leg	Real Madrid	4–4 (a.e.t.) (5–4 agg.)	Real Sociedad	Madrid
21:30 CEST (UTC+2)	Endrick 30'; Bellingham 82'; Tchouaméni 86'; Camavinga (yellow card) 90+2'; Rüdiger 115'	Report	Barrenetxea 16'; Alaba 72' (o.g.); Aramburu (yellow card) 74'; Oyarzabal 80', 90+3', (yellow card) 87'; López (yellow card) 87'; Olasagasti (yellow card) 106'	Stadium: Santiago Bernabéu; Attendance: 81,044; Referee: Javier Alberola Rojas

=== UEFA Europa League ===
==== League phase ====
The draw for the league phase was held on 30 August 2024.

Pos	Team	Pld	W	D	L	GF	GA	GD	Pts	Qualification
11	(Romanian Football Federation) FCSB	8	4	2	2	10	9	+1	14	Advance to knockout phase play-offs (seeded)
12	(Royal Dutch Football Association) Ajax	8	4	1	3	16	8	+8	13	Advance to knockout phase play-offs (seeded)
13	(Royal Spanish Football Federation) Real Sociedad	8	4	1	3	13	9	+4	13	Advance to knockout phase play-offs (seeded)
14	(Turkish Football Federation) Galatasaray	8	3	4	1	19	16	+3	13	Advance to knockout phase play-offs (seeded)
15	(Italian Football Federation) Roma	8	3	3	2	10	6	+4	12	Advance to knockout phase play-offs (seeded)

Source: UEFA
Rules for classification: League phase tiebreakers

Round	1	2	3	4	5	6	7	8
Ground	A	H	A	A	H	H	A	H
Result	D	L	W	L	W	W	L	W
Position	16	25	17	25	16	12	18	13

Source: UEFA
A = Away; H = Home; W = Win; D = Draw; L = Loss

25 September 2024 1	Nice (France)	1–1	(Spain) Real Sociedad	Nice, France
21:00 CEST (UTC+2)	Rosario (yellow card) 26', (goal) 45'; Guessand (yellow card) 26', (penalty missed) 54'	Report	Barrenetxea 18'; Zubimendi (yellow card) 20'; Odriozola (yellow card) 43'; Pacheco (yellow card) 53'	Stadium: Allianz Riviera; Attendance: 20,545; Referee: Morten Krogh (Denmark)

3 October 2024 2	Real Sociedad (Spain)	1–2	(Belgium) Anderlecht	San Sebastián
18:45 CEST (UTC+2)	Marín 5'; Óskarsson (yellow card) 52'	Report	Vázquez 28'; Leoni 39'; Rits (yellow card) 45+1'; Foket (yellow card) 61'	Stadium: Reale Arena; Attendance: 30,985; Referee: Marian Barbu (Romania)

24 October 2024 3	Maccabi Tel Aviv (Israel)	1–2	(Spain) Real Sociedad	Belgrade, Serbia
18:45 CEST (UTC+2)	Patati (yellow card) 37'; Davida (yellow card) 74' (yellow-red card) 88'; Van Overeem (yellow card) 80'; Turgeman 81'; Yehezkel (yellow card) 88'	Report	Kubo (yellow card) 13'; Pacheco 19'; López (yellow card) 73'; Gómez 64'	Stadium: Partizan Stadium; Attendance: 429; Referee: Rohit Saggi (Norway)
Note: Due to the Gaza war, Israeli teams were required to play their home matches at neutral venues until further notice.

7 November 2024 4	Viktoria Plzeň (Czech Republic)	2–1	(Spain) Real Sociedad	Plzeň, Czech Republic
21:00 CET (UTC+1)	Adu 13'; Paluska (yellow card) 37'; Červ (yellow card) 56'; Kalvach 90'; Havel (yellow card) 90+6'	Report	Óskarsson 35'; Zubeldia (yellow card) 42'; Oyarzabal (yellow card) 72'; Aramburu (yellow card) 90+6'; Sučić (yellow card) 90+7'; Aguerd (yellow card) 90+8'	Stadium: Doosan Arena; Attendance: 11,130; Referee: Andris Treimanis (Latvia)

28 November 2024 5	Real Sociedad (Spain)	2–0	(Netherlands) Ajax	San Sebastián
21:00 CET (UTC+1)	Méndez (yellow card) 21'; Barrentexea 67'; Kubo 85'; Aramburu (yellow card) 90'; Muñoz (yellow card) 90+2'	Report	Wijndal (yellow card) 81'; Van den Boomen (yellow card) 89'	Stadium: Reale Arena; Attendance: 32,786; Referee: Matej Jug (Slovenia)

12 December 2024 6	Real Sociedad (Spain)	3–0	(Ukraine) Dynamo Kyiv	San Sebastián
21:00 CET (UTC+1)	Oyarzabal (penalty missed) 19', 19', 33'; Becker 24'; Odriozola (yellow card) 75'; Magunazelaia (yellow card) 83'	Report	Dubinchak (yellow card) 30'; Braharu (yellow card) 89'	Stadium: Reale Arena; Attendance: 26,457; Referee: Harm Osmers (Germany)

23 January 2025 7	Lazio (Italy)	3–1	(Spain) Real Sociedad	Rome, Italy
21:00 CET (UTC+1)	Gila 5'; Rovella (yellow card) 7'; Zaccagni 32', (yellow card) 53'; Castellanos 34'	Report	Muñoz (yellow card) 12' (yellow-red card) 30'; Zubimendi (yellow card) 39'; Barrenetxea 82'	Stadium: Stadio Olimpico; Attendance: 32,635; Referee: Lawrence Visser (Belgium)

30 January 2025 8	Real Sociedad (Spain)	2–0	(Greece) PAOK	San Sebastián
21:00 CET (UTC+1)	Odriozola (yellow card) 39'; Óskarsson 43', 48'; Olasagasti (yellow card) 75'	Report	Ozdoyev (yellow card) 6'; Brandon (yellow card) 49'	Stadium: Reale Arena; Attendance: 23,872; Referee: John Beaton (Scotland)

==== Knockout phase ====
===== Knockout phase play-offs =====
The draw for the knockout phase play-offs was held on 31 January 2025.

13 February 2025 First leg	Midtjylland (Denmark)	1–2	(Spain) Real Sociedad	Herning, Denmark
18:45 CET (UTC+1)	Buksa (yellow card) 25', (goal) 38'; Şimşir (yellow card) 51'; Castillo (yellow card) 58'	Report	Balda (yellow card) 2'; Méndez 11' (pen.), (yellow card) 61'; Kubo 31'; Aramburu (yellow card) 90+4'; Zubimendi (yellow card) 90+5'	Stadium: MCH Arena; Attendance: 9,401; Referee: Orel Grinfeld (Israel)

20 February 2025 Second leg	Real Sociedad (Spain)	5–2 (7–3 agg.)	(Denmark) Midtjylland	San Sebastián
21:00 CET (UTC+1)	Méndez 5'; Sučić 18', 45+2'; Olasagasti (yellow card) 66'; Oyarzabal 73' (pen.); Óskarsson 90'	Report	Buksa 24' (pen.), (yellow card) 31'; Osorio 38'; Paulinho (yellow card) 42'; Silva (red card) 70'	Stadium: Reale Arena; Attendance: 27,728; Referee: Serdar Gözübüyük (Netherlands)

===== Round of 16 =====
The draw for the round of 16 was held on 21 February 2025.

6 March 2025 First leg	Real Sociedad (Spain)	1–1	(England) Manchester United	San Sebastián
18:45 CET (UTC+1)	Zubeldia (yellow card) 49'; Oyarzabal 70' (pen.)	Report	Fernandes (yellow card) 56'; Zirkzee 57'	Stadium: Reale Arena; Attendance: 34,391; Referee: Ivan Kružliak (Slovakia)

13 March 2025 Second leg	Manchester United (England)	4–1 (5–2 agg.)	(Spain) Real Sociedad	Manchester, England
20:00 GMT (UTC+0)	De Ligt (yellow card) 9'; Fernandes 16' (pen.), 50' (pen.), 87'; Dalot 90+1'; Collyer (yellow card) 90+4'	Report	Oyarzabal 10' (pen.), (yellow card) 64'; Zubeldia (yellow card) 13'; Marín (yellow card) 39'; Zubimendi (yellow card) 51'; Aramburu (red card) 63'; Elustondo (yellow card) 69'; Barrenetxea (yellow card) 74'; Aguerd (yellow card) 90'	Stadium: Old Trafford; Attendance: 73,189; Referee: Benoît Bastien (France)

== Statistics ==
=== Squad statistics ===
No.	Pos	Nat	Player	Total		La Liga		Copa del Rey		UEFA Europa League	
No.	Pos	Nat	Player	Apps	Goals	Apps	Goals	Apps	Goals	Apps	Goals
Goalkeepers
1	GK	(Spain) ESP	Álex Remiro	0	0	0	0	0	0	0	0
13	GK	(Spain) ESP	Unai Marrero	0	0	0	0	0	0	0	0
Defenders
2	DF	(Spain) ESP	Álvaro Odriozola	0	0	0	0	0	0	0	0
3	DF	(Spain) ESP	Aihen Muñoz	0	0	0	0	0	0	0	0
5	DF	(Spain) ESP	Igor Zubeldia	0	0	0	0	0	0	0	0
6	DF	(Spain) ESP	Aritz Elustondo	0	0	0	0	0	0	0	0
12	DF	(Spain) ESP	Javi López	0	0	0	0	0	0	0	0
18	DF	(Mali) MLI	Hamari Traoré	0	0	0	0	0	0	0	0
20	DF	(Spain) ESP	Jon Pacheco	0	0	0	0	0	0	0	0
21	DF	(Morocco) MAR	Nayef Aguerd	0	0	0	0	0	0	0	0
27	DF	(Venezuela) VEN	Jon Aramburu	0	0	0	0	0	0	0	0
Midfielders
4	MF	(Spain) ESP	Martín Zubimendi	0	0	0	0	0	0	0	0
8	MF	(Russia) RUS	Arsen Zakharyan	0	0	0	0	0	0	0	0
15	MF	(Spain) ESP	Urko González de Zárate	0	0	0	0	0	0	0	0
16	MF	(Spain) ESP	Jon Ander Olasagasti	0	0	0	0	0	0	0	0
22	MF	(Spain) ESP	Beñat Turrientes	0	0	0	0	0	0	0	0
23	MF	(Spain) ESP	Brais Méndez	0	0	0	0	0	0	0	0
24	MF	(Croatia) CRO	Luka Sučić	0	0	0	0	0	0	0	0
28	MF	(Spain) ESP	Pablo Marín	0	0	0	0	0	0	0	0
Forwards
7	FW	(Spain) ESP	Ander Barrenetxea	0	0	0	0	0	0	0	0
9	FW	(Iceland) ISL	Orri Óskarsson	0	0	0	0	0	0	0	0
10	FW	(Spain) ESP	Mikel Oyarzabal	0	0	0	0	0	0	0	0
11	FW	(Suriname) SUR	Sheraldo Becker	0	0	0	0	0	0	0	0
14	FW	(Japan) JPN	Takefusa Kubo	0	0	0	0	0	0	0	0
17	FW	(Spain) ESP	Sergio Gómez	0	0	0	0	0	0	0	0
19	FW	(Nigeria) NGR	Umar Sadiq	0	0	0	0	0	0	0	0
25	FW	(Spain) ESP	Jon Magunazelaia	0	0	0	0	0	0	0	0
Players who transferred out during the season
