= Aritz Elustondo =

Spanish footballer (born 1994)

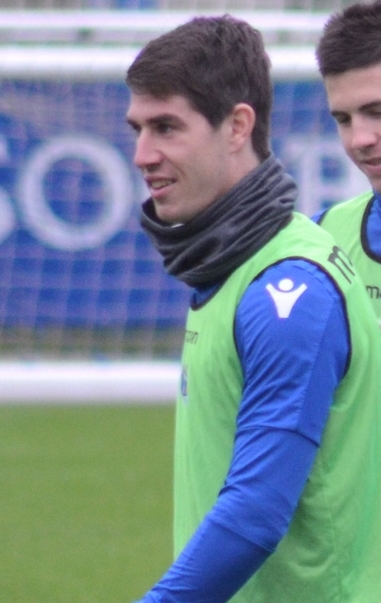
- Elustondo with Real Sociedad in 2018

Personal information
- Full name: Aritz Elustondo Irribarria
- Date of birth: 28 March 1994 (age 32)
- Place of birth: Beasain, Spain
- Height: 1.80 m (5 ft 11 in)
- Position: Defender

Team information
- Current team: PAOK
- Number: 6

Youth career
- Real Sociedad

Senior career*
| Years | Team | Apps | (Gls) |
| 2012–2015 | Real Sociedad B | 59 | (6) |
| 2012–2013 | → Beasain (loan) | 29 | (0) |
| 2015–2026 | Real Sociedad | 243 | (11) |
| 2026– | PAOK | 4 | (0) |

International career^{‡}
| 2016 | Spain U21 | 1 | (0) |
| 2018– | Basque Country | 3 | (1) |
- * Club domestic league appearances and goals as of 23:00, 20 September 2026 (UTC) ‡ National team caps and goals as of 24 March 2024

Aritz Elustondo Irribarria (born 28 March 1994) is a Spanish professional footballer who plays mainly as a right-back but also as a central defender for Super League Greece club PAOK.

== Club career ==
=== Real Sociedad ===
Born in Beasain, Gipuzkoa, Basque Country, Elustondo graduated from Real Sociedad's youth system. On 13 July 2012, he was loaned to Tercera División club SD Beasain, where he made his senior debut.

Elustondo returned to his alma mater in June 2013, and was assigned to the reserves in the Segunda División B. He signed a new contract on 31 January 2014, running until 2016.

On 14 January 2015, Elustondo made his first-team debut, starting in a 2–2 home draw against Villarreal CF in the round of 16 of the Copa del Rey. He first appeared in La Liga three days later, in the 0–1 home loss to Rayo Vallecano.

Elustondo scored his first professional goal on 31 January 2015, but in a 4–1 defeat at Real Madrid. On 3 January of the following year, having been regularly used by new manager Eusebio Sacristán, he agreed to an extension until 2020.

Elustondo remained at Anoeta Stadium in the ensuing years, signing new deals in February 2018 (to June 2022) and August 2020 (to June 2024). He made his 300th competitive appearance for Real on 30 November 2025, in a 2–3 home loss against Villarreal.

Elustondo left the club at the end of 2025–26 at the age of 32 and with 313 total games to his credit, including four in the season's domestic cup which his team won.

=== PAOK ===
On 28 June 2026, after failing to have his contract renewed, Elustondo moved abroad for the first time and signed with Super League Greece side PAOK FC.

== International career ==
Elustondo won his only cap for Spain at under-21 level on 28 March 2016, featuring the entire 1–0 win over Norway in a friendly held in Murcia.

== Career statistics ==
As of match played 23 May 2026

Appearances and goals by club, season and competition
| Club | Season | League | | | Copa del Rey | | Europe | | Other | | Total | |
| Club | Season | Division | Apps | Goals | Apps | Goals | Apps | Goals | Apps | Goals | Apps | Goals |
|---|---|---|---|---|---|---|---|---|---|---|---|---|
| Real Sociedad B | 2013–14 | Segunda División B | 31 | 4 | — | | — | | 0 | 0 | 31 | 4 |
| Real Sociedad B | 2014–15 | Segunda División B | 24 | 2 | — | | — | | 0 | 0 | 24 | 2 |
| Real Sociedad B | 2015–16 | Segunda División B | 4 | 0 | — | | — | | 0 | 0 | 4 | 0 |
| Real Sociedad B | Total | | 59 | 6 | 0 | 0 | 0 | 0 | 0 | 0 | 59 | 6 |
| Real Sociedad | 2014–15 | La Liga | 4 | 1 | 2 | 0 | — | | — | | 6 | 1 |
| Real Sociedad | 2015–16 | La Liga | 31 | 1 | 0 | 0 | — | | — | | 31 | 1 |
| Real Sociedad | 2016–17 | La Liga | 9 | 0 | 3 | 0 | — | | — | | 12 | 0 |
| Real Sociedad | 2017–18 | La Liga | 19 | 3 | 0 | 0 | 5 (Note: Appearances in UEFA Europa League) | 0 | — | | 24 | 3 |
| Real Sociedad | 2018–19 | La Liga | 27 | 1 | 2 | 0 | — | | — | | 29 | 1 |
| Real Sociedad | 2019–20 | La Liga | 22 | 0 | 5 (Note: Includes appearance in 2020 Copa del Rey final (played in 2021)) | 0 | — | | — | | 27 | 0 |
| Real Sociedad | 2020–21 | La Liga | 23 | 1 | 2 | 0 | 3 | 0 | 0 | 0 | 28 | 1 |
| Real Sociedad | 2021–22 | La Liga | 30 | 4 | 4 | 0 | 6 | 0 | — | | 40 | 4 |
| Real Sociedad | 2022–23 | La Liga | 25 | 0 | 5 | 0 | 6 | 1 | — | | 36 | 1 |
| Real Sociedad | 2023–24 | La Liga | 15 | 0 | 5 | 0 | 5 (Note: Appearances in UEFA Champions League) | 0 | — | | 25 | 0 |
| Real Sociedad | 2024–25 | La Liga | 22 | 0 | 3 | 0 | 10 | 0 | — | | 35 | 0 |
| Real Sociedad | 2025–26 | La Liga | 16 | 0 | 4 | 0 | — | | — | | 20 | 0 |
| Real Sociedad | Total | | 243 | 11 | 35 | 0 | 35 | 1 | 0 | 0 | 313 | 12 |
| Career total | | | 302 | 17 | 35 | 0 | 35 | 1 | 0 | 0 | 372 | 18 |

== Honours ==
Real Sociedad

- Copa del Rey: 2019–20, 2025–26
