= Jon Aramburu =

Venezuelan footballer (born 2002)

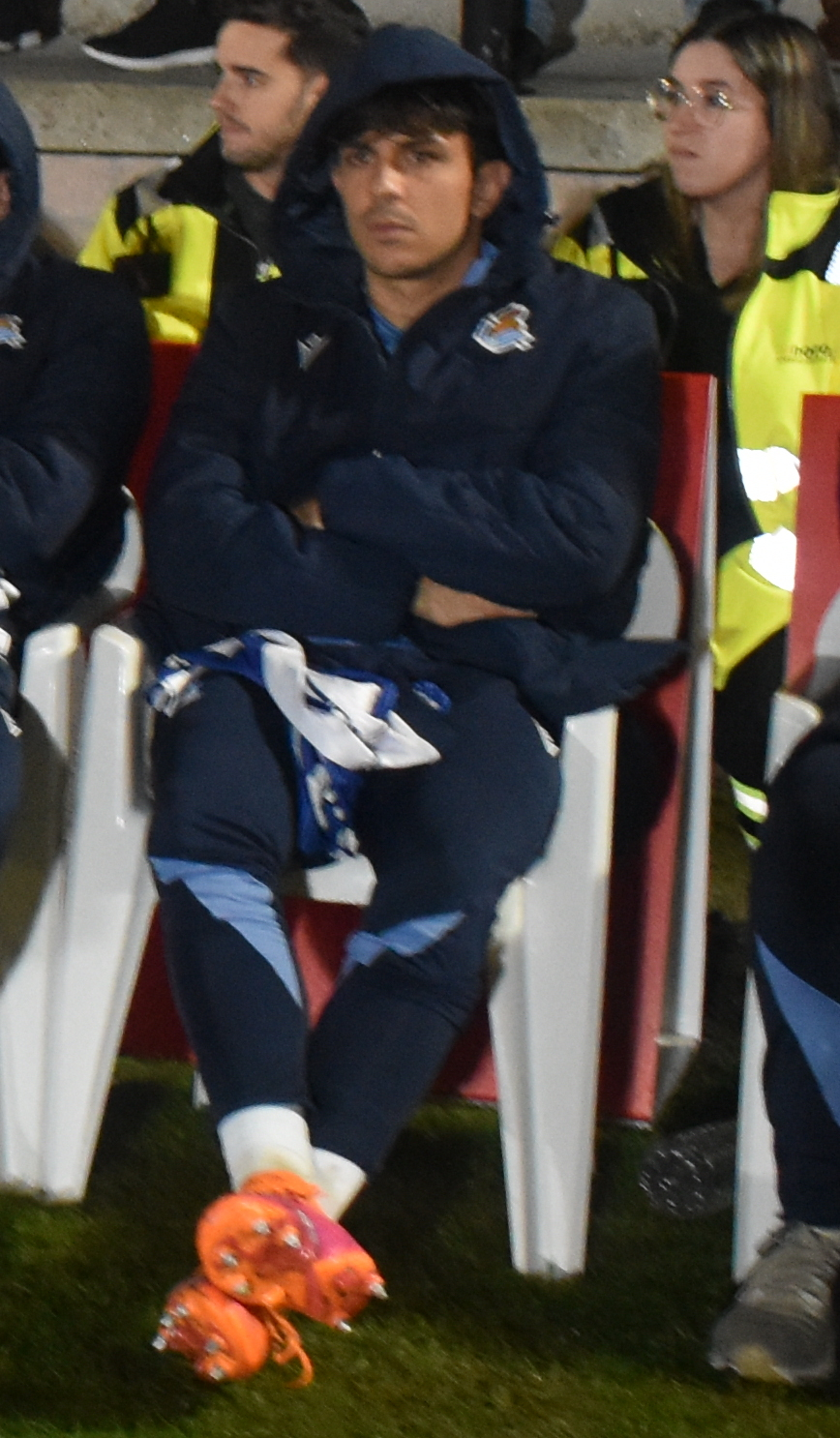
- Aramburu as a Real Sociedad player in 2025

Personal information
- Full name: Jon Mikel Aramburu Mejías
- Date of birth: 23 July 2002 (age 24)
- Place of birth: Caracas, Venezuela
- Height: 1.76 m (5 ft 9 in)
- Position: Right-back

Team information
- Current team: Real Sociedad
- Number: 2

Youth career
- 2016–2017: Real Sociedad
- 2017–2020: Deportivo La Guaira

Senior career*
Years	Team	Apps	(Gls)
2020–2022	Deportivo La Guaira	60	(1)
2022–2023	Real Unión	33	(3)
2023–2024	Real Sociedad B	13	(0)
2024–	Real Sociedad	88	(2)

International career^{‡}
2019	Venezuela U17	4	(0)
2022–2023	Venezuela U21	6	(0)
2023	Venezuela U23	3	(0)
2023–	Venezuela	24	(1)
Medal record
Men's football
Representing Venezuela
FIFA Series
Runner-up	2026 Uzbekistan
- * Club domestic league appearances and goals as of 25 October 2026 ‡ National team caps and goals as of 22:03, 2 October 2026 (UTC)

Jon Mikel Aramburu Mejías (born 23 July 2002) is a Venezuelan professional footballer who plays as a right-back for La Liga club Real Sociedad and the Venezuela national team.

== Club career ==
=== Early years ===
Aramburu was a part of Real Sociedad's youth academy in Spain from 2016 to 2017, but due to FIFA regulations had to return to Venezuela. He joined the youth academy of Deportivo La Guaira, and began his senior career with them in 2020 where they won the 2020 Venezuelan Primera División.

=== Real Unión ===
On 3 August 2022, he transferred to the Spanish club Real Unión in the Primera Federación for two seasons with an option for a third.

=== Real Sociedad ===
On 1 August 2023, he signed with Real Sociedad B on a three-year contract.

On 1 November 2023, he made his first team debut at the Copa del Rey against Buñol in a 1–0 away victory.

He made his debut in the La Liga playing for Real Sociedad on 20 January 2024 in a match against Celta Vigo, starting the game and playing the first 45 minutes. A few weeks later, he made his Champions League debut, coming on in the 87th minute against PSG in the round of 16.

== International career ==
Born in Venezuela, Aramburu is of Basque descent through his grandparents, and holds dual citizenship with Spain. He played for the Venezuela U17s at the 2019 South American U-17 Championship. He also played for the at the 2022 and 2023 Maurice Revello Tournaments. He made his debut with the senior Venezuela national team in a friendly 0–0 tie over Guatemala on 18 June 2023.

== Personal life ==
Aramburu is of Basque descent and holds Spanish nationality.

== Career statistics ==
=== Club ===
As of match played 25 October 2026

Appearances and goals by club, season and competition
Club	Season	League			Cup		Continental		Other		Total	
Club	Season	Division	Apps	Goals	Apps	Goals	Apps	Goals	Apps	Goals	Apps	Goals
Deportivo La Guaira	2020	Liga FUTVE	17	0	0	0	0	0	1	0	19	0
Deportivo La Guaira	2021	Liga FUTVE	30	1	0	0	2 (Note: Appearances in Copa Libertadores)	0	0	0	32	1
Deportivo La Guaira	2022	Liga FUTVE	13	1	0	0	5 (Note: Appearances in Copa Sudamericana)	0	0	0	32	1
Deportivo La Guaira	Total		60	2	0	0	7	0	0	0	83	2
Real Unión	2022–23	Primera Federación	33	3	2	0	—		3 (Note: Appearances in Copa Federación de España)	0	38	3
Real Sociedad B	2023–24	Primera Federación	13	0	—		—		—		13	0
Real Sociedad	2023–24	La Liga	11	0	3	0	1 (Note: Appearances in UEFA Champions League)	0	—		15	0
Real Sociedad	2024–25	La Liga	35	1	5	0	9 (Note: Appearances in UEFA Europa League)	0	—		49	1
Real Sociedad	2025–26	La Liga	34	1	7	0	—		—		41	1
Real Sociedad	2026–27	La Liga	8	0	0	0	0	0	0	0	8	0
Real Sociedad	Total		88	2	15	0	10	0	0	0	113	2
Career total			194	7	17	0	17	0	4	0	232	7

=== International ===
As of match played 2 October 2026

Appearances and goals by national team and year
National team	Year	Apps	Goals
Venezuela	2023	1	0
Venezuela	2024	11	1
Venezuela	2025	6	0
Venezuela	2026	6	0
Total		24	1

Scores and results list Venezuela's goal tally first, score column indicates score after each Aramburu goal.

List of international goals scored by Jon Aramburu
No.	Date	Venue	Opponent	Score	Result	Competition
1	15 October 2024	Estadio Defensores del Chaco, Asunción, Paraguay	Paraguay	1–0	1–2	2026 FIFA World Cup qualification

== Honours ==
Deportivo La Guaira

- Venezuelan Primera División: 2020

Real Sociedad

- Copa del Rey: 2025–26

Individual

- IFFHS Top 11 Copa América: 2024
