= Ander Barrenetxea (footballer) =

Spanish footballer (born 2001)

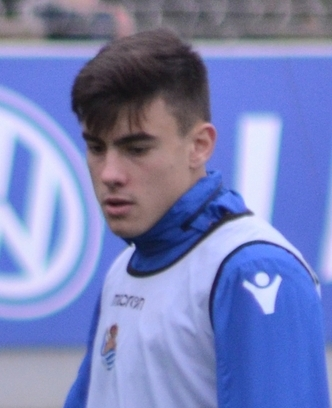
- Barrenetxea training with Real Sociedad in 2018

Personal information
- Full name: Ander Barrenetxea Muguruza
- Date of birth: 27 December 2001 (age 24)
- Place of birth: San Sebastián, Spain
- Height: 1.75 m (5 ft 9 in)
- Positions: Forward; left winger

Team information
- Current team: Real Sociedad
- Number: 7

Youth career
- 2011–2013: Antiguoko
- 2013–2018: Real Sociedad

Senior career*
Years	Team	Apps	(Gls)
2018–2019	Real Sociedad C	4	(1)
2019	Real Sociedad B	8	(1)
2018–	Real Sociedad	188	(19)

International career^{‡}
2018–2019	Spain U18	6	(1)
2019–2020	Spain U19	5	(0)
2020–2023	Spain U21	13	(1)
2026–	Spain	1	(0)
Medal record
Representing Spain
UEFA European Under-21 Championship
Runner-up	2023 Georgia–Romania	Team
UEFA European Under-19 Championship
Winner	2019 Armenia	Team
- * Club domestic league appearances and goals as of 25 October 2026 ‡ National team caps and goals as of 31 March 2026

Ander Barrenetxea Muguruza (born 27 December 2001), commonly known mononymously as Barrene, is a Spanish professional footballer who plays as a forward or left winger for Real Sociedad and the Spain national team.

== Club career ==
=== Early career ===
Born in San Sebastián, Gipuzkoa, Basque Country, Barrenetxea is a product of Real Sociedad's youth setup. He joined the club from Antiguoko in 2013 alongside Martín Zubimendi.

In the 2018–19 season, he began to train with the senior team, while registered with the club's C-team playing in the amateur fourth tier. In early December 2018, he renewed his contract until 2025.

=== First team debut ===
On 22 December 2018, Barrenetxea made his professional and La Liga debut as a late substitute for Real Sociedad in a 1–0 home loss against Deportivo Alavés. By doing so, he became the first footballer born in the 21st century to appear in the competition, 26th youngest debutant in the division overall, and club's youngest since the Spanish Civil War; the latter behind only 15-year-old Pedro Irastorza in 1934. Coincidentally, the footballer who left the field – Juanmi – was even younger upon debuting the competition eight years earlier.

Barrenetxea's rapid progression to the senior team made him the first youth product to appear at that level without having played for the club's reserve team. Two days after his breakthrough, he returned to play Real Sociedad C.

Barrenetxea made his debut for Sanse on 6 January 2019, scoring on his debut in the third tier during a 3–0 home victory against Izarra. On 12 May, he scored his first professional goal for the first team in a 3–1 home victory over Real Madrid.

=== Promoting to the first team ===
On 9 June 2019, Barrenetxea was definitely promoted to the main squad of the Txuri-urdin. He played in the 2020 Copa del Rey final, starting in the earlier rounds with three goals and coming off the bench in the quarter-final victory against Real Madrid at the Estadio Santiago Bernabeu. The final was delayed for one year due to the COVID-19 pandemic in Spain, with Barrenetxea coming out as a late substitute in the 1–0 Basque derby victory against Athletic Bilbao.

Barrenetxea missed the second half of the 2021–22 season with a thigh injury which required surgery, but recovered successfully after an operation by surgeon Lasse Lempainen in Turku, Finland. By February 2023, at the age of 21, he had reached the milestone of 100 appearances for the club. At the end of that season, Real Sociedad qualified for the UEFA Champions League for the first time in one decade.

On 18 April 2026, during the 2026 Copa del Rey final against Atlético Madrid, Barrenetxea set a Guinness World Record for the fastest goal scored in a Copa del Rey final, after scoring 14 seconds into the match.

== International career ==
=== Youth ===
Barrenetxea was called up for the Spain Under-16 team in 2016 and 2017, and appeared for the Under-18 in November 2018. He also featured for the regional Basque Country in the same age groups.

Barrenetxea was selected for the 20-man Spain squad for the 2019 UEFA European Under-19 Championship, and came on as an 80th-minute substitute as Spain beat Portugal 2–0 in the final to be crowned winners of the competition.

Barrenetxea received call-up to Under-21 team for the 2023 UEFA European Under-21 Championship, and was taking part in the tournament as Spain awarded as runner-ups after England defeated Spain by 1–0 in the final.

=== Senior ===
On 31 March 2026, Barrenetxea made his senior debut for Spain in a goalless friendly draw against Egypt.

== Career statistics ==
=== Club ===
As of match played 25 October 2026

Appearances and goals by club, season and competition
Club	Season	League			Copa del Rey		Europe		Other		Total	
Club	Season	Division	Apps	Goals	Apps	Goals	Apps	Goals	Apps	Goals	Apps	Goals
Real Sociedad C	2018–19	Tercera División	4	1	—		—		—		4	1
Real Sociedad B	2018–19	Segunda División B	8	1	—		—		—		8	1
Real Sociedad	2018–19	La Liga	9	1	0	0	—		—		9	1
Real Sociedad	2019–20	La Liga	17	1 (Note: Includes one goal against Mallorca on 26 January 2020, credited as an own goal in some sources.)	7 (Note: Includes appearance in 2020 Copa del Rey Final (played in 2021))	3	—		—		24	4
Real Sociedad	2020–21	La Liga	31	3	2	0	6 (Note: Appearance(s) in UEFA Europa League)	0	1 (Note: Appearance in Supercopa de España)	0	40	3
Real Sociedad	2021–22	La Liga	11	1	1	0	4	0	—		16	1
Real Sociedad	2022–23	La Liga	23	3	1	0	1	0	—		25	3
Real Sociedad	2023–24	La Liga	30	4	3	0	7 (Note: Appearances in UEFA Champions League)	2	—		40	6
Real Sociedad	2024–25	La Liga	30	1	7	4	10	3	—		46	8
Real Sociedad	2025–26	La Liga	29	3	4	1	—		—		33	4
Real Sociedad	2026–27	La Liga	9	2	0	0	2	0	0	0	11	2
Real Sociedad	Total		188	19	26	8	29	5	1	0	244	31
Career total			200	21	26	8	29	5	1	0	256	34

=== International ===
As of match played 31 March 2026

Appearances and goals by national team and year
National team	Year	Apps	Goals
Spain	2026	1	0
Total		1	0

== Honours ==
Real Sociedad

- Copa del Rey: 2019–20, 2025–26

Spain U21

- UEFA European Under-21 Championship runner-up: 2023
