= 2018–19 Real Sociedad season =

Real Sociedad
2018–19 season
- President: Jokin Aperribay
- Head coach: Asier Garitano (until 26 December 2018); Imanol Alguacil (from 27 December 2018)
- Stadium: Anoeta
- La Liga: 9th
- Copa del Rey: Round of 16
- Top goalscorer: League: Mikel Oyarzabal (12); All: Mikel Oyarzabal (13)
Home colours	Away colours	Third colours

The 2018–19 Real Sociedad season was the club's 72nd season in La Liga. This article shows player statistics and all matches (official and friendly) played by the club during the 2018–19 season.

The season was the first since 2002-03 and 2004–05 without both veterans Xabi Prieto and Imanol Agirretxe, who mutually retired after the previous campaign's conclusion.

== Players ==
=== First-team squad ===
As of 31 August 2018

Note: Flags indicate national team as defined under FIFA eligibility rules; some limited exceptions apply. Players may hold more than one non-FIFA nationality.

No.	Pos.	Nation	Player
1	GK	ARG	Gerónimo Rulli
2	DF	ESP	Joseba Zaldúa
3	DF	ESP	Diego Llorente
4	MF	ESP	Asier Illarramendi (Captain)
5	MF	ESP	Igor Zubeldia
6	DF	MEX	Héctor Moreno
7	FW	ESP	Juanmi
8	MF	ESP	Mikel Merino
10	MF	ESP	Mikel Oyarzabal
11	MF	BEL	Adnan Januzaj
12	FW	BRA	Willian José
13	GK	ESP	Miguel Ángel Moyà

No.	Pos.	Nation	Player
14	MF	ESP	Rubén Pardo
15	DF	ESP	Aritz Elustondo
16	MF	ESP	Martín Merquelanz
17	MF	ESP	David Zurutuza
18	DF	ESP	Andoni Gorosabel
19	DF	FRA	Théo Hernandez (on loan from Real Madrid)
20	DF	POR	Kévin Rodrigues
21	FW	ESP	Jon Bautista
22	DF	ESP	Raúl Navas
23	MF	ESP	Luca Sangalli
24	FW	ESP	Sandro (on loan from Everton)
33	MF	ESP	Jon Guridi

=== Reserve team ===
Note: Flags indicate national team as defined under FIFA eligibility rules; some limited exceptions apply. Players may hold more than one non-FIFA nationality.

No.	Pos.	Nation	Player
27	DF	FRA	Robin Le Normand
30	GK	ESP	Andoni Zubiaurre
34	FW	ESP	Ander Barrenetxea
—	MF	ESP	David Concha

=== Out on loan ===
Note: Flags indicate national team as defined under FIFA eligibility rules; some limited exceptions apply. Players may hold more than one non-FIFA nationality.

No.	Pos.	Nation	Player
—	MF	ESP	Eneko Capilla (at Cultural Leonesa until 30 June 2019)

== Transfers ==
=== In ===
Date	Player	From	Type	Fee	Ref
27 June 2018	(Spain) Markel Bergara	(Spain) Getafe	Loan return		
30 June 2018	(Spain) Héctor Hernández	(Spain) Alavés	Loan return		
30 June 2018	(Spain) Joseba Zaldúa	(Spain) Leganés	Loan return		
12 July 2018	(Spain) Mikel Merino	(England) Newcastle United	Transfer	€12,000,000	
10 August 2018	(France) Théo Hernandez	(Spain) Real Madrid	Loan		
30 August 2018	(Spain) Sandro	(England) Everton	Loan		
30 January 2019	(France) Modibo Sagnan	(France) Racing Club de Lens	Transfer	€5,000,000	

=== Out ===
Date	Player	To	Type	Fee	Ref
27 June 2018	(Spain) Markel Bergara	(Spain) Getafe	Transfer	Free	
28 June 2018	(Spain) Toño	(Cyprus) AEK Larnaca	Transfer	Free	
30 June 2018	(Spain) Xabi Prieto	Retired			
3 July 2018	(Spain) Sergio Canales	(Spain) Real Betis	Transfer	Free	
5 July 2018	(Spain) Álvaro Odriozola	(Spain) Real Madrid	Transfer	€40,000,000	
6 July 2018	(Spain) Carlos Martínez	(Spain) Oviedo	Transfer	Free	
27 August 2018	(Spain) Alberto de la Bella	(Spain) Las Palmas	Transfer	Free	
29 August 2018	(Spain) Imanol Agirretxe	Retired			
30 August 2018	(Spain) Héctor Hernández	(Spain) Tenerife	Transfer	Free	
30 January 2019	(France) Modibo Sagnan	(France) Racing Club de Lens	Loan		

== Competitions ==
=== Overall ===
Competition	First match	Last match	Starting round	Final position	Record							
Competition	First match	Last match	Starting round	Final position	Pld	W	D	L	GF	GA	GD	Win %
La Liga	18 August 2018	19 May 2019	Matchday 1	9th	38	13	11	14	45	46	−1	34.21
Copa del Rey	1 November 2018	17 January 2019	Round of 32	Round of 16	4	1	3	0	5	3	+2	25.00
Total					42	14	14	14	50	49	+1	33.33

Last updated: 18 May 2019
Source: Competitions

=== La Liga ===
==== League table ====
Pos	Team	Pld	W	D	L	GF	GA	GD	Pts	Qualification or relegation
7	Espanyol	38	14	11	13	48	50	−2	53 (Note: Espanyol finished ahead of Athletic Bilbao on head-to-head points: Espanyol 1–0 Athletic Bilbao, Athletic Bilbao 1–1 Espanyol.)	Qualification for the Europa League second qualifying round (Note: Since the winners of the 2018–19 Copa del Rey, Valencia, qualified for European competition based on league position, the spot awarded to the cup winners (Europa League group stage) was passed to the sixth-placed team and the spot awarded to the sixth-placed team (Europa League second qualifying round) was passed to the seventh-placed team.)
8	Athletic Bilbao	38	13	14	11	41	45	−4	53	
9	Real Sociedad	38	13	11	14	45	46	−1	50 (Note: Real Sociedad finished ahead of Real Betis and Alavés on head-to-head points: Real Sociedad 6, Real Betis 5, Alavés 5. Real Betis finished ahead of Alavés on goal difference: Real Betis –8, Alavés –11.)	
10	Real Betis	38	14	8	16	44	52	−8	50	
11	Alavés	38	13	11	14	39	50	−11	50	

Source: La Liga, Soccerway
Rules for classification: 1) Points; 2) Head-to-head points; 3) Head-to-head goal difference; 4) Goal difference; 5) Goals scored; 6) Fair-play points (Note: Head-to-head record is used only after all the matches between the teams in question have been played)

==== Results summary ====
Overall								Home						Away					
Pld	W	D	L	GF	GA	GD	Pts	W	D	L	GF	GA	GD	W	D	L	GF	GA	GD
38	13	11	14	45	46	−1	50	7	6	6	23	20	+3	6	5	8	22	26	−4

Last updated: 18 May 2019.
Source: Competitive matches

==== Results by round ====
Round	1	2	3	4	5	6	7	8	9	10	11	12	13	14	15	16	17	18	19	20	21	22	23	24	25	26	27	28	29	30	31	32	33	34	35	36	37	38
Ground	A	A	A	H	A	H	H	A	H	A	H	A	H	A	H	A	H	A	H	A	H	H	A	H	A	H	A	H	A	H	A	H	A	H	H	A	H	A
Result	W	D	L	L	W	D	L	W	D	L	D	W	W	L	L	L	L	W	W	D	D	W	D	W	D	L	L	D	D	W	L	D	L	L	W	W	W	L
Position	7	7	8	13	9	10	13	9	9	12	13	10	8	9	13	15	15	11	8	9	9	9	9	7	8	8	9	10	10	9	11	10	11	11	10	8	8	9

Updated to match(es) played on 18 May 2019. Source: Competitive matches
A = Away; H = Home; W = Win; D = Draw; L = Loss

==== Matches ====
Win Draw Loss Fixtures

18 August 2018 1	Villarreal	1–2	Real Sociedad	Villarreal
20:15 CEST (UTC+02:00)	Gerard 16'; Morlanes (yellow card) 36'; Cáseres (yellow card) 67'	Report	Willian José 40'; Hernandez (yellow card) 51'; Juanmi 71', (yellow card) 75'; Zaldúa (yellow card) 77'	Stadium: La Cerámica; Attendance: 15,900; Referee: Mario Melero López

24 August 2018 2	Leganés	2–2	Real Sociedad	Leganés
22:15 CEST (UTC+02:00)	El Zhar 54', 88'; Silva (yellow card) 90+2'	Report	Zurutuza 11'; Illarramendi 17'; Zaldúa (yellow card) 53'; Juanmi (yellow card) 80'	Stadium: Butarque; Attendance: 8,951; Referee: José Luis Munuera Montero

31 August 2018 3	Eibar	2–1	Real Sociedad	Eibar
22:00 CEST (UTC+02:00)	Dmitrović (yellow card) 14'; Cucurella 26'; Diop (yellow card) 34'; Peña (yellow card) 75'; Charles 90+1'	Report	Willian José 15' (pen.); Juanmi (yellow card) 58'; Illarramendi (yellow card) 80'	Stadium: Ipurua; Attendance: 6,174; Referee: José María Sánchez Martínez

15 September 2018 4	Real Sociedad	1–2	Barcelona	San Sebastián
16:15 CEST (UTC+02:00)	Elustondo 12'; Illarramendi (yellow card) 43'	Report	L. Suárez 63'; Dembélé 66'; Umtiti (yellow card) 87'	Stadium: Anoeta; Attendance: 26,756; Referee: Carlos del Cerro Grande

21 September 2018 5	Huesca	0–1	Real Sociedad	Huesca
21:00 CEST (UTC+02:00)	Luisinho (yellow card) 43'; C. Hernández (yellow card) 45'; Gallar (yellow card) 65'; Longo (yellow card) 76'; Ferreiro (yellow card) 90+1'	Report	Pardo (yellow card) 23'; Merino 64'; Juanmi (yellow card) 71' (yellow-red card) 71'; Hernandez (red card) 82'	Stadium: El Alcoraz; Attendance: 6,948; Referee: Ignacio Iglesias Villanueva

25 September 2018 6	Real Sociedad	2–2	Rayo Vallecano	San Sebastián
21:00 CEST (UTC+02:00)	Bautista 5'; Zubeldia (yellow card) 15'; Moreno (yellow card) 77'; Willian José 78'; Merino (yellow card) 81'; Zaldúa (yellow card) 89'	Report	Advíncula 31', (yellow card) 61'; Trejo 36' (pen.), (yellow card) 90+1'; Kakuta (yellow card) 62'	Stadium: Anoeta; Attendance: 21,459; Referee: Juan Martínez Munuera

29 September 2018 7	Real Sociedad	0–1	Valencia	San Sebastián
13:00 CEST (UTC+02:00)	Zubeldia (yellow card) 63'; Elustondo (yellow card) 80'; Sandro (yellow card) 90+4'	Report	Lato (yellow card) 9'; Gameiro 36'; Cheryshev (yellow card) 45'; Gabriel (yellow card) 70'; Neto (yellow card) 90+2'; Vezo (yellow card) 90+4'	Stadium: Anoeta; Attendance: 23,577; Referee: Jesús Gil Manzano

5 October 2018 8	Athletic Bilbao	1–3	Real Sociedad	Bilbao
21:00 CEST (UTC+02:00)	De Marcos (yellow card) 19'; Susaeta (yellow card) 26'; Martínez (yellow card) 29'; Williams (yellow card) 31'; Muniain 32'; D. García (yellow card) 39'; R. García (yellow card) 67'	Report	Oyarzabal 30' (pen.), 74' (pen.); Zubeldia (yellow card) 38'; Sangalli 47'; Moyà (yellow card) 57'; Zurutuza (yellow card) 70'; Illarramendi (yellow card) 83'; Bautista (yellow card) 90+2'	Stadium: San Mamés; Attendance: 46,684; Referee: Alejandro Hernández Hernández

22 October 2018 9	Real Sociedad	0–0	Girona	San Sebastián
21:00 CEST (UTC+02:00)	Rodrigues (yellow card) 41'; Illarramendi (yellow card) 53'; Elustondo (yellow card) 72'	Report	Porro (yellow card) 81'	Stadium: Anoeta; Attendance: 20,997; Referee: Pablo González Fuertes

27 October 2018 10	Atlético Madrid	2–0	Real Sociedad	Madrid
20:45 CEST (UTC+02:00)	Godín 45'; Koke (yellow card) 49'; Savić (yellow card) 53'; Filipe Luís 60'	Report	Zubeldia (yellow card) 44'	Stadium: Wanda Metropolitano; Attendance: 57,514; Referee: Antonio Mateu Lahoz

4 November 2018 11	Real Sociedad	0–0	Sevilla	San Sebastián
18:30 CET (UTC+01:00)	Hernandez (yellow card) 85'	Report	Navas (yellow card) 73'; Amadou (yellow card) 79'; Mesa (yellow card) 90+1'	Stadium: Anoeta Stadium; Attendance: 24,810; Referee: Eduardo Prieto Iglesias

11 November 2018 12	Levante	1–3	Real Sociedad	Valencia
21:00 CET (UTC+01:00)	Chema 4', (yellow card) 24'; Boateng (yellow card) 13'; Morales (yellow card) 49'; Bardhi (yellow card) 65'; Campana (yellow card) 76'; Olazabal (yellow card) 88'	Report	Illarramendi (yellow card) 53'; Hernandez 73'; Juanmi 77'; Oyarzabal 83'	Stadium: Ciutat de València; Attendance: 19,890; Referee: David Medié Jiménez

26 November 2018 13	Real Sociedad	2–1	Celta Vigo	San Sebastián
21:00 CET (UTC+01:00)	Oyarzabal 37', (yellow card) 90+2'; Zurutuza 47'; Sandro (yellow card) 89'	Report	Juncà (yellow card) 76'; Gómez 82', (yellow card) 87'	Stadium: Anoeta; Attendance: 17,745; Referee: Mario Melero López

2 December 2018 14	Real Betis	1–0	Real Sociedad	Seville
12:00 CET (UTC+01:00)	Junior 33', (yellow card) 59'; Lo Celso (yellow card) 46'; Mandi (yellow card) 76'; Carvalho (yellow card) 79'	Report	Hernandez (yellow card) 62'; Willian José (yellow card) 80'	Stadium: Benito Villamarín; Attendance: 46,562; Referee: Guillermo Cuadra Fernández

9 December 2018 15	Real Sociedad	1–2	Valladolid	San Sebastián
18:30 CET (UTC+01:00)	Oyarzabal 62'; Merino (yellow card) 66'; Zaldúa (yellow card) 73'	Report	Calero (yellow card) 4'; Toni 16'; Antoñito 54'; Míchel (yellow card) 71'	Stadium: Anoeta; Attendance: 23,260; Referee: Ignacio Iglesias Villanueva

15 December 2018 16	Getafe	1–0	Real Sociedad	Getafe
13:00 CET (UTC+01:00)	Molina 3', (yellow card) 32'; Foulquier (yellow card) 35'; Cristóforo (yellow card) 86'	Report	Willian José (yellow card) 33'; Le Normand (yellow card) 38'; Illarramendi (yellow card) 63'; Januzaj (yellow card) 72'	Stadium: Coliseum Alfonso Pérez; Attendance: 9,018; Referee: Santiago Jaime Latre

21 December 2018 17	Real Sociedad	0–1	Alavés	San Sebastián
21:00 CET (UTC+01:00)	Zurutuza (yellow card) 25'; Merino (yellow card) 90+1'	Report	Calleri 11'; Pina (yellow card) 22'; Wakaso (yellow card) 34'; Duarte (yellow card) 76'; Maripán (yellow card) 90+4'	Stadium: Anoeta; Attendance: 22,431; Referee: Xavier Estrada Fernández

6 January 2019 18	Real Madrid	0–2	Real Sociedad	Madrid
18:30 CET (UTC+01:00)	Vázquez (yellow card) 40' (yellow-red card) 61'; Marcelo (yellow card) 52'; Modrić (yellow card) 75'; Isco (yellow card) 88'	Report	Willian José 3' (pen.), (yellow card) 36'; Pardo 83'	Stadium: Santiago Bernabéu; Attendance: 53,412; Referee: José Luis Munuera Montero

14 January 2019 19	Real Sociedad	3–2	Espanyol	San Sebastián
21:00 CET (UTC+01:00)	Merino 3', (yellow card) 43' (yellow-red card) 75'; Willian José 8' (pen.), 63', (yellow card) 64'; Elustondo (yellow card) 33'; Moreno (yellow card) 58'; Illarramendi (yellow card) 61'; Rulli (yellow card) 90+4'	Report	Da. López (yellow card) 7'; Darder (yellow card) 22'; Naldo 32', (yellow card) 69'; Llorente 45' (o.g.); Vilà (yellow card) 65'	Stadium: Anoeta; Attendance: 17,301; Referee: Carlos del Cerro Grande

20 January 2019 20	Rayo Vallecano	2–2	Real Sociedad	Madrid
18:30 CET (UTC+01:00)	Comesaña 22'; Embarba 28'; Velázquez (yellow card) 76'; Dimitrievski (yellow card) 88'	Report	Moreno 39'; Willian José 82'; Llorente (yellow card) 87'	Stadium: Vallecas; Attendance: 12,562; Referee: David Medié Jiménez

27 January 2019 21	Real Sociedad	0–0	Huesca	San Sebastián
18:30 CET (UTC+01:00)		Report	Miramón (yellow card) 59'; Herrera (yellow card) 63'; Akapo (yellow card) 90+4'	Stadium: Anoeta; Attendance: 21,252; Referee: Eduardo Prieto Iglesias

2 February 2019 22	Real Sociedad	2–1	Athletic Bilbao	San Sebastián
16:15 CET (UTC+01:00)	Oyarzabal 16'; Willian José 45'; Navas (yellow card) 81'	Report	Capa (yellow card) 55'; García 82'	Stadium: Anoeta; Attendance: 27,073; Referee: Antonio Mateu Lahoz

10 February 2019 23	Valencia	0–0	Real Sociedad	Valencia
16:15 CET (UTC+01:00)	Mina (yellow card) 26'; Piccini (yellow card) 57'	Report	Hernandez (yellow card) 33'; Illarramendi (yellow card) 76'; Sandro (yellow card) 78'; Zaldúa (yellow card) 86'	Stadium: Mestalla; Attendance: 38,885; Referee: Mario Melero López

16 February 2019 24	Real Sociedad	3–0	Leganés	San Sebastián
18:30 CET (UTC+01:00)	Llorente (yellow card) 21'; Willian José (yellow card) 45', (goal) 75'; Oyarzabal 50', 59'; Navas (yellow card) 63'; Hernandez (yellow card) 90'	Report	Siovas (yellow card) 45'; Bustinza (yellow card) 89'	Stadium: Anoeta; Attendance: 22,997; Referee: José Luis Munuera Montero

25 February 2019 25	Girona	0–0	Real Sociedad	Girona
21:00 CET (UTC+01:00)	Stuani (yellow card) 32'; Lozano (yellow card) 54'; Douglas Luiz (yellow card) 66'; Granell (yellow card) 70'	Report	Merino (yellow card) 86'	Stadium: Montilivi; Attendance: 10,170; Referee: Eduardo Prieto Iglesias

3 March 2019 26	Real Sociedad	0–2	Atlético Madrid	San Sebastián
18:30 CET (UTC+01:00)	Zaldúa (yellow card) 3'	Report	Morata 30', 33'; Koke (yellow card) 41' (yellow-red card) 62'; Rodri (yellow card) 59'; Godín (yellow card) 63'	Stadium: Anoeta; Attendance: 26,004; Referee: José Luis González González

10 March 2019 27	Sevilla	5–2	Real Sociedad	Seville
18:30 CET (UTC+01:00)	Sarabia 25'; Munir (yellow card) 45+2'; Ben Yedder 48', 58', 61'; Oyarzabal 69' (o.g.); Carriço (yellow card) 81'	Report	Oyarzabal 28', 77' (pen.); Zubeldia (yellow card) 36'; Navas (yellow card) 44'	Stadium: Ramón Sánchez Pizjuán; Attendance: 35,813; Referee: Ignacio Iglesias Villanueva

15 March 2019 28	Real Sociedad	1–1	Levante	San Sebastián
21:00 CET (UTC+01:00)	Januzaj 26'; Sandro (yellow card) 44'; Merino (yellow card) 70'	Report	Vezo (yellow card) 30'; Chema (yellow card) 38'; Mayoral 79'	Stadium: Anoeta; Attendance: 20,605; Referee: Adrián Cordero Vega

31 March 2019 29	Valladolid	1–1	Real Sociedad	Valladolid
18:30 CEST (UTC+02:00)	Nacho (yellow card) 2'; Keko 9', (yellow card) 46'; Anuar (yellow card) 55'; Ünal (yellow card) 90+3'	Report	Elustondo (yellow card) 75'; Oyarzabal 79'	Stadium: José Zorrilla; Attendance: 18,775; Referee: Javier Alberola Rojas

4 April 2019 30	Real Sociedad	2–1	Real Betis	San Sebastián
21:30 CEST (UTC+02:00)	Juanmi 17'; Llorente (yellow card) 24'; Zaldúa (yellow card) 52'; Oyarzabal 83'	Report	Guardado (yellow card) 18'; Lo Celso (yellow card) 19'; Barragán (yellow card) 43'; Canales 56'	Stadium: Anoeta; Attendance: 16,417; Referee: David Medié Jiménez

7 April 2019 31	Celta Vigo	3–1	Real Sociedad	Vigo
18:30 CEST (UTC+02:00)	Aspas 51' (pen.), 70', (yellow card) 70'; Yokuşlu (yellow card) 66'; Gómez 90+1'	Report	Willian José 32' (pen.), (red card) 58'; Rulli (yellow card) 46'	Stadium: Abanca-Balaídos; Attendance: 20,519; Referee: Mario Melero López

14 April 2019 32	Real Sociedad	1–1	Eibar	San Sebastián
16:15 CEST (UTC+02:00)	Juanmi 1'; Llorente (yellow card) 39'; Pardo (yellow card) 87'	Report	De Blasis (yellow card) 33'; Jordán (yellow card) 55', (goal) 85'	Stadium: Anoeta; Attendance: 24,308; Referee: Santiago Jaime Latre

20 April 2019 33	Barcelona	2–1	Real Sociedad	Barcelona
20:45 CEST (UTC+02:00)	Lenglet 45'; Alba 64'	Report	Merino (yellow card) 15'; Juanmi 62'	Stadium: Camp Nou; Attendance: 75,470; Referee: Pablo González Fuertes

25 April 2019 34	Real Sociedad	0–1	Villarreal	San Sebastián
20:30 CEST (UTC+02:00)	Navas (yellow card) 24'; Oyarzabal (yellow card) 79'	Report	Funes Mori (yellow card) 42'; Toko Ekambi (yellow card) 68'; Iborra (yellow card) 78'; Gerard 85'	Stadium: Anoeta; Attendance: 20,060; Referee: José Luis Munuera Montero

28 April 2019 35	Real Sociedad	2–1	Getafe	San Sebastián
16:15 CEST (UTC+02:00)	Willian José 21' (pen.); Merino (yellow card) 45'; Oyarzabal 53'; Rulli (yellow card) 60'	Report	Cabrera (yellow card) 26'; Mata (yellow card) 75'; Sáiz (yellow card) 83', (goal) 89'	Stadium: Anoeta; Attendance: 19,386; Referee: Eduardo Prieto Iglesias

4 May 2019 36	Alavés	0–1	Real Sociedad	Vitoria-Gasteiz
18:30 CEST (UTC+02:00)	Wakaso (yellow card) 47'	Report	Willian José 24'; Pardo (yellow card) 73'; Merino (yellow card) 80'; Zubeldia (yellow card) 89'	Stadium: Mendizorrotza; Attendance: 18,509; Referee: Javier Alberola Rojas

12 May 2019 37	Real Sociedad	3–1	Real Madrid	San Sebastián
18:30 CEST (UTC+02:00)	Merino 26'; Zaldúa 57'; Zubeldia (yellow card) 59'; Barrenetxea 67'	Report	Brahim 6'; Vallejo (red card) 39'; Carvajal (yellow card) 42'; Casemiro (yellow card) 75'	Stadium: Anoeta; Attendance: 27,322; Referee: Juan Martínez Munuera

18 May 2019 38	Espanyol	2–0	Real Sociedad	Cornellà
16:15 CEST (UTC+02:00)	Rosales 58'; Sánchez (yellow card) 62'; Wu 65', (yellow card) 66'	Report	Llorente (yellow card) 37'; Elustondo (yellow card) 82'	Stadium: RCDE Stadium; Attendance: 26,568; Referee: Santiago Jaime Latre

=== Copa del Rey ===
==== Round of 32 ====
1 November 2018 First leg	Celta Vigo	1–1	Real Sociedad	Vigo
16:15 CET (UTC+01:00)	Aspas 58'; Méndez (yellow card) 78'; Vázquez (yellow card) 83'	Report	Llorente (yellow card) 15'; Oyarzabal (yellow card) 48'; Zurutuza (yellow card) 64'; Moreno (yellow card) 86'; Juanmi 89'; Elustondo (yellow card) 90+1'; Illarramendi (yellow card) 90+4'	Stadium: Balaídos; Attendance: 15,195; Referee: José Luis Munuera Montero

5 December 2018 Second leg	Real Sociedad	2–0 (3–1 agg.)	Celta Vigo	San Sebastián
20:30 CET (UTC+01:00)	Oyarzabal 10'; Januzaj 27'	Report		Stadium: Anoeta; Attendance: 21,336; Referee: José María Sánchez Martínez

==== Round of 16 ====
10 January 2019 First leg	Real Betis	0–0	Real Sociedad	Seville
20:30 CET (UTC+01:00)	Mandi (yellow card) 42'	Report	Zaldúa (yellow card) 10'; Zubeldia (yellow card) 17'; Llorente (yellow card) 79'	Stadium: Benito Villamarín; Attendance: 26,273; Referee: Santiago Jaime Latre

17 January 2019 Second leg	Real Sociedad	2–2 (2–2 (a) agg.)	Real Betis	San Sebastián
19:30 CET (UTC+01:00)	Le Normand (yellow card) 26'; Januzaj (yellow card) 29'; Zubeldia 40'; Merino 62'; Moreno (yellow card) 74'; Illarramendi (yellow card) 83'	Report	Canales 37'; Lo Celso (yellow card) 43' (yellow-red card) 90+1'; Loren 70', (yellow card) 78'; Barragán (yellow card) 89'	Stadium: Anoeta; Attendance: 21,090; Referee: Eduardo Prieto Iglesias

== Statistics ==
=== Appearances and goals ===
Last updated on 18 May 2019

No.	Pos	Nat	Player	Total		La Liga		Copa del Rey	
No.	Pos	Nat	Player	Apps	Goals	Apps	Goals	Apps	Goals
Goalkeepers
1	GK	(Argentina) ARG	Gerónimo Rulli	29	0	27	0	2	0
13	GK	(Spain) ESP	Miguel Ángel Moyà	13	0	11	0	2	0
Defenders
2	DF	(Spain) ESP	Joseba Zaldúa	29	1	25+1	1	3	0
3	DF	(Spain) ESP	Diego Llorente	23	0	20+1	0	2	0
6	DF	(Mexico) MEX	Héctor Moreno	29	1	21+4	1	3+1	0
15	DF	(Spain) ESP	Aritz Elustondo	29	1	24+3	1	1+1	0
18	DF	(Spain) ESP	Andoni Gorosabel	7	0	6+1	0	0	0
19	DF	(France) FRA	Théo Hernandez	28	1	22+2	1	4	0
20	DF	(Portugal) POR	Kévin Rodrigues	7	0	5+2	0	0	0
22	DF	(Spain) ESP	Raúl Navas	16	0	15+1	0	0	0
27	DF	(France) FRA	Robin Le Normand	7	0	3+1	0	3	0
29	DF	(Spain) ESP	Aihen Muñoz	11	0	11	0	0	0
35	DF	(Spain) ESP	Álex Sola	1	0	1	0	0	0
Midfielders
4	MF	(Spain) ESP	Asier Illarramendi	26	1	20+3	1	2+1	0
5	MF	(Spain) ESP	Igor Zubeldia	37	1	29+4	0	3+1	1
8	MF	(Spain) ESP	Mikel Merino	32	4	24+5	3	1+2	1
11	MF	(Belgium) BEL	Adnan Januzaj	24	2	13+7	1	3+1	1
14	MF	(Spain) ESP	Rubén Pardo	25	1	16+8	1	1	0
16	MF	(Spain) ESP	Martín Merquelanz	1	0	0+1	0	0	0
17	MF	(Spain) ESP	David Zurutuza	24	2	13+8	2	3	0
23	MF	(Spain) ESP	Luca Sangalli	19	1	12+6	1	1	0
26	MF	(Spain) ESP	Ander Guevara	1	0	1	0	0	0
36	MF	(Spain) ESP	Martín Zubimendi	1	0	0+1	0	0	0
Forwards
7	FW	(Spain) ESP	Juanmi	34	6	16+14	5	2+2	1
10	FW	(Spain) ESP	Mikel Oyarzabal	41	14	36+1	13	4	1
12	FW	(Brazil) BRA	Willian José	34	11	28+3	11	2+1	0
21	FW	(Spain) ESP	Jon Bautista	19	1	4+14	1	1	0
24	FW	(Spain) ESP	Sandro Ramírez	26	0	10+14	0	1+1	0
28	FW	(Spain) ESP	Roberto López	1	0	0+1	0	0	0
34	FW	(Spain) ESP	Ander Barrenetxea	9	1	5+4	1	0	0
