= Jon Ander Olasagasti =

Spanish footballer (born 2000)

Personal information
- Full name: Jon Ander Olasagasti Imizcoz
- Date of birth: 16 August 2000 (age 26)
- Place of birth: San Sebastián, Spain
- Height: 1.76 m (5 ft 9 in)
- Position: Midfielder

Team information
- Current team: Levante
- Number: 8

Youth career
- Lengokoak
- Antiguoko
- 2014–2018: Real Sociedad

Senior career*
Years	Team	Apps	(Gls)
2017–2019	Real Sociedad C	35	(7)
2019–2023	Real Sociedad B	89	(11)
2021–2025	Real Sociedad	40	(1)
2025–	Levante	33	(1)

International career^{‡}
2022	Spain U21	1	(0)
2024–	Basque Country	1	(0)
- * Club domestic league appearances and goals as of 27 May 2026 ‡ National team caps and goals as of 24 March 2024

Jon Ander Olasagasti Imizcoz (born 16 August 2000) is a Spanish professional footballer who plays as a midfielder for Levante UD.

== Club career ==
Born in San Sebastián, Gipuzkoa, Basque Country, Olasagasti joined Real Sociedad's youth setup in 2014. He made his senior debut with the C-team on 26 August 2017, playing the last 20 minutes of a 2–0 Tercera División away loss against SCD Durango.

Olasagasti scored his first senior goal on 2 September 2018, netting the C's third goal in a 6–0 home routing of SD Zamudio. He scored seven goals for the side during the season, and was subsequently promoted to the reserves in the Segunda División B in July 2019.

On 1 July 2020, Olasagasti renewed his contract with the Txuri-urdin until 2023, and was a regular starter during the campaign as his side returned to the Segunda División after 59 years.

Olasagasti made his professional debut on 24 September 2021, starting in a 2–0 home loss against SD Huesca. Eight days later he scored his first professional goal, netting the opener in a 4–1 away routing of AD Alcorcón.

On 1 December 2021, Olasagasti made his first-team debut by starting in a 4–0 away routing of CF Panadería Pulido in the season's Copa del Rey. His La Liga debut occurred on 21 January 2023, as he replaced David Silva in a 2–0 away win over Rayo Vallecano.

On 16 July 2025, Olasagasti signed a three-year contract with fellow top tier Levante UD.

== Career statistics ==
=== Club ===
As of match played 24 May 2025

Appearances and goals by club, season and competition
Club	Season	League			National cup		Europe		Other		Total	
Club	Season	Division	Apps	Goals	Apps	Goals	Apps	Goals	Apps	Goals	Apps	Goals
Real Sociedad C	2018–19	Tercera División	35	7	—		—		—		35	7
Real Sociedad B	2019–20	Segunda División B	7	1	—		—		—		7	1
Real Sociedad B	2020–21	Segunda División B	22	3	—		—		1 (Note: Appearance in Segunda División B play-offs)	0	23	3
Real Sociedad B	2021–22	Segunda División	33	4	0	0	—		—		33	4
Real Sociedad B	2022–23	Primera Federación	27	3	—		—		2	0	29	3
Real Sociedad B	Total		89	11	0	0	—		3	0	92	11
Real Sociedad	2021–22	La Liga	0	0	2	0	0	0	—		2	0
Real Sociedad	2022–23	La Liga	3	0	1	0	0	0	—		4	0
Real Sociedad	2023–24	La Liga	13	0	3	0	1 (Note: Appearances in UEFA Champions League)	0	—		17	0
Real Sociedad	2024–25	La Liga	24	1	6	1	6 (Note: Appearances in UEFA Europa League)	0	—		36	2
Real Sociedad	Total		40	1	12	1	7	0	0	0	59	2
Career total			164	19	12	1	7	0	3	0	185	20
