= Mikel Goti =

Spanish footballer (born 2002)

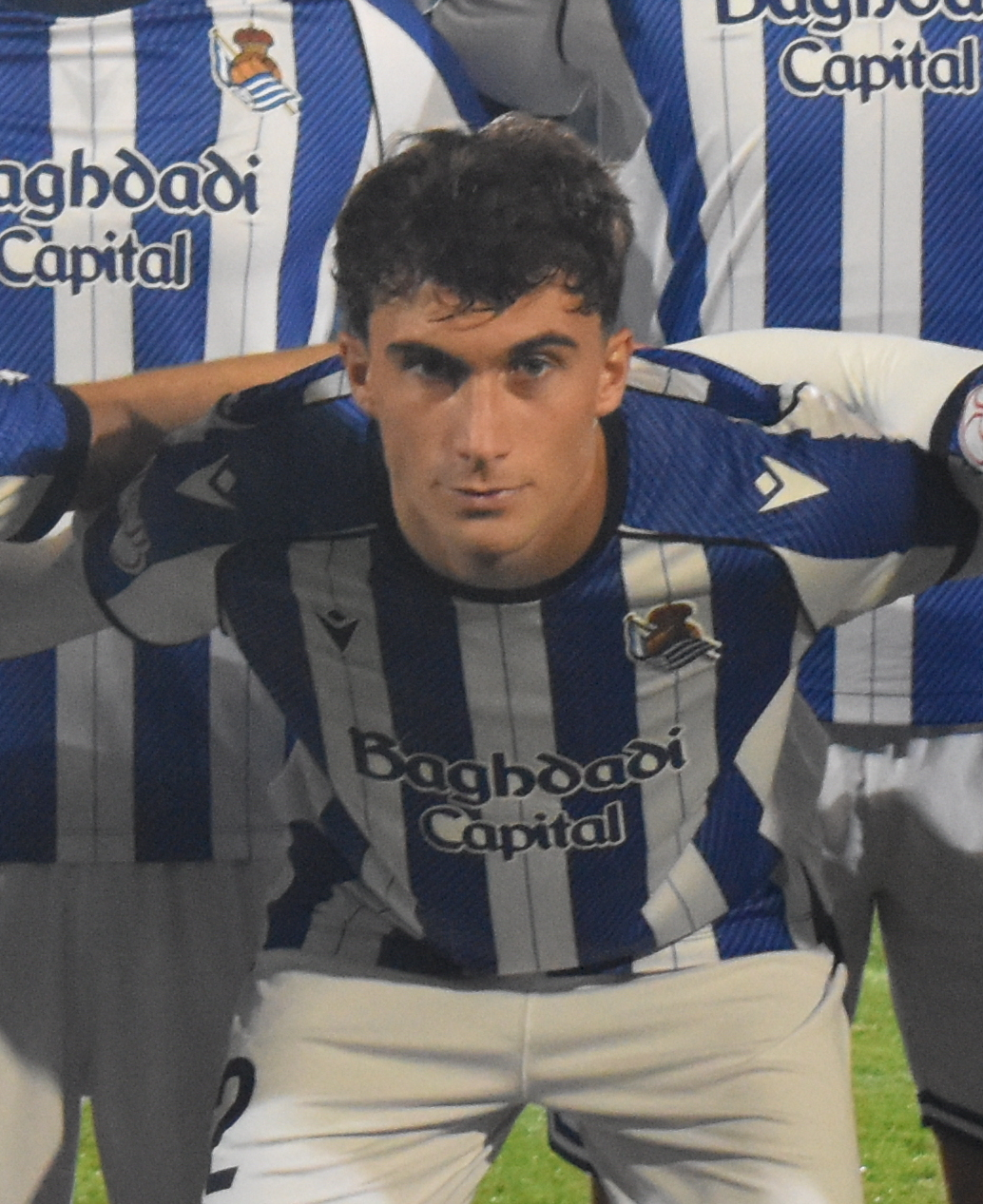
- Goti in 2025

Personal information
- Full name: Mikel Goti López
- Date of birth: 23 May 2002 (age 24)
- Place of birth: Gorliz, Spain
- Height: 1.85 m (6 ft 1 in)
- Position: Attacking midfielder

Team information
- Current team: Oviedo (on loan from Real Sociedad)

Youth career
- 2012–2020: Athletic Bilbao

Senior career*
Years	Team	Apps	(Gls)
2020–2021	Basconia	25	(6)
2021–2023	Bilbao Athletic	59	(6)
2023–2025	Real Sociedad B	62	(16)
2024–	Real Sociedad	4	(0)
2026	→ Córdoba (loan)	16	(1)
2026–	→ Oviedo (loan)	0	(0)
- * Club domestic league appearances and goals as of 6 June 2026

Mikel Goti López (born 23 May 2002) is a Spanish footballer who plays for Real Oviedo, on loan from Real Sociedad. Mainly an attacking midfielder, he can also play as a winger.

== Career ==
At the age of ten, Goti joined the youth academy of Athletic Bilbao. In 2020, he made his senior debut with farm team CD Basconia, before playing for the reserve team of Athletic by the second half of the season.

On 19 June 2023, Goti signed for rivals Real Sociedad, being initially assigned to the B-team in Primera Federación. By the summer of 2024, he was training with the club's first team and received offers from a number of Segunda División sides, which he rejected. On 21 November 2024, he debuted and scored his first goal for the first team during a 5–0 away win over FC Jove Español San Vicente in the Copa del Rey.

On 8 April 2025, Goti renewed his link until 2028, being promoted to the first team ahead of the 2025–26 campaign. He made his La Liga debut on 13 September, starting in a 2–1 home loss to Real Madrid.

On 27 January 2026, after being rarely used, Goti was loaned to Córdoba CF in the second division, until June. On 1 September, he moved to fellow league team Real Oviedo also in a temporary deal.

== Style of play ==
Goti can play as an attacking midfielder or as a winger and is left-footed. Speaking to Spanish newspaper El Diario Vasco, Goti's former coach Enrique Rapado compared his style of play to that of Athletic legend Francisco Yeste.

== Personal life ==
Goti's older brother Asier is also a footballer. A forward, he never played in higher than Tercera División.

== Career statistics ==
As of match played 24 May 2026

Appearances and goals by club, season and competition
Club	Season	League			Cup		Europe		Other		Total	
Club	Season	Division	Apps	Goals	Apps	Goals	Apps	Goals	Apps	Goals	Apps	Goals
Basconia	2020–21	Tercera División	25	6	1	0	—		—		26	6
Bilbao Athletic	2020–21	Segunda División B	1	0	—		—		—		1	0
Bilbao Athletic	2021–22	Primera Federación	26	1	—		—		—		26	1
Bilbao Athletic	2022–23	Primera Federación	32	5	—		—		—		32	5
Bilbao Athletic	Total		59	6	—		—		—		59	6
Real Sociedad B	2023–24	Primera Federación	31	3	—		—		—		31	3
Real Sociedad B	2024–25	Primera Federación	31	13	—		—		3 (Note: Appearances in 2025 Primera Federación play-offs)	0	34	13
Real Sociedad B	Total		62	16	—		—		3	0	65	16
Real Sociedad	2024–25	La Liga	0	0	1	1	—		—		1	1
Real Sociedad	2025–26	La Liga	4	0	2	1	—		—		6	1
Real Sociedad	2026–27	La Liga	0	0	0	0	0	0	—		0	0
Real Sociedad	Total		4	0	3	2	—		—		7	2
Córdoba (loan)	2025–26	Segunda División	16	1	—		—		—		16	1
Career total			167	29	3	2	0	0	3	0	173	31
