= Martín Zubimendi =

Spanish footballer (born 1999)

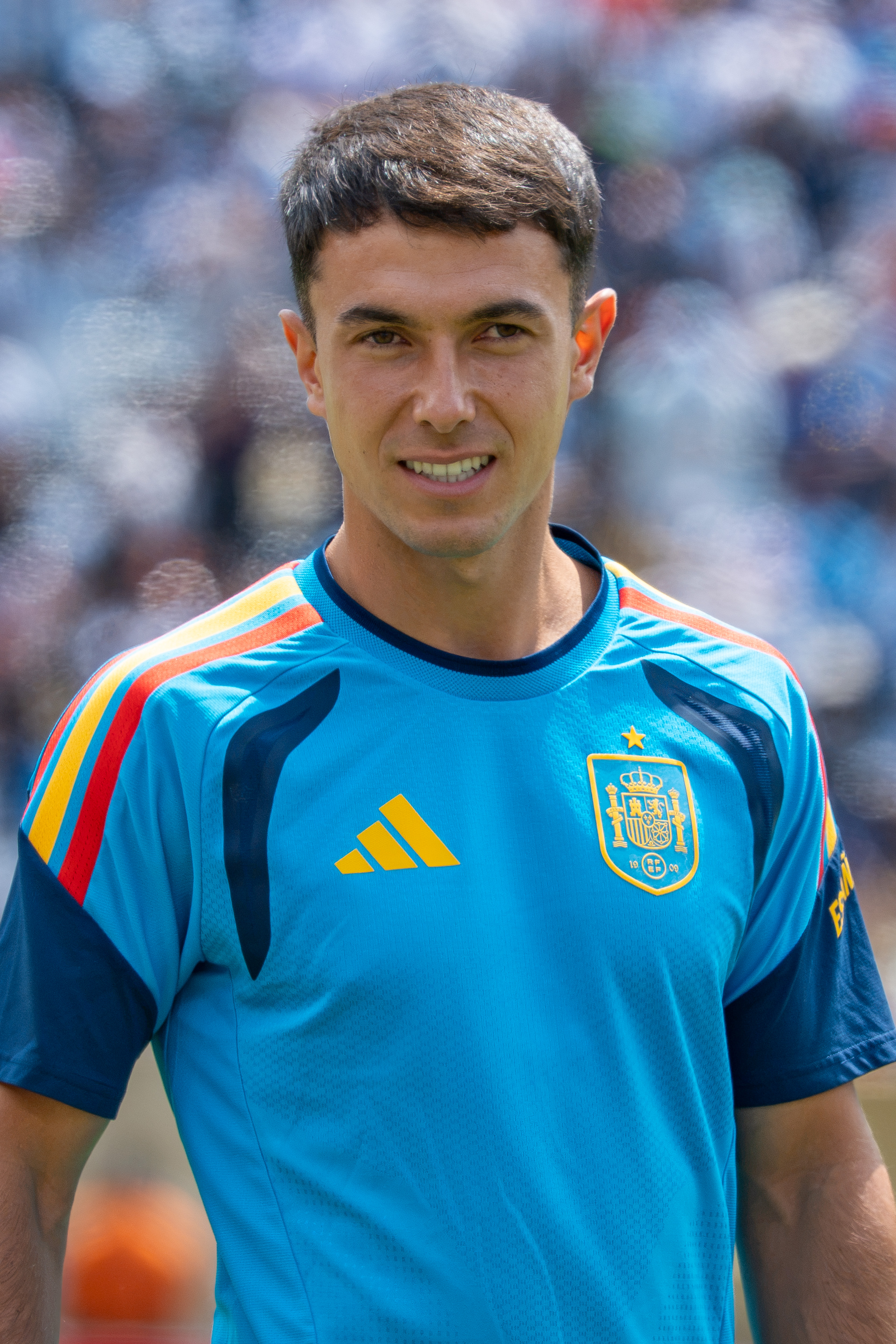
- Zubimendi with Spain in 2026

Personal information
- Full name: Martín Zubimendi Ibáñez
- Date of birth: 2 February 1999 (age 27)
- Place of birth: San Sebastián, Spain
- Height: 1.81 m (5 ft 11 in)
- Position: Defensive midfielder

Team information
- Current team: Arsenal
- Number: 36

Youth career
- 2006–2011: Antiguoko
- 2011–2016: Real Sociedad
- 2011–2013: → Antiguoko (loan)

Senior career*
Years	Team	Apps	(Gls)
2016–2018	Real Sociedad C	26	(1)
2017–2020	Real Sociedad B	50	(4)
2019–2025	Real Sociedad	180	(9)
2025–	Arsenal	45	(5)

International career^{‡}
2016	Spain U17	1	(0)
2017	Spain U19	1	(0)
2020–2021	Spain U21	7	(0)
2021	Spain U23	6	(0)
2021–	Spain	32	(3)
Medal record
Men's football
Representing Spain
FIFA World Cup
Winner	2026 Canada–Mexico–US
UEFA European Championship
Winner	2024 Germany
UEFA Nations League
Winner	2023 Netherlands
Runner-up	2025 Germany
Olympic Games
Silver medal – second place	2020 Tokyo	Team
- * Club domestic league appearances and goals as of 17:12, 7 November 2026 (UTC) ‡ National team caps and goals as of 22:05, 15 November 2026 (UTC)

Martín Zubimendi Ibáñez (born 2 February 1999) is a Spanish professional footballer who plays as a defensive midfielder for Premier League club Arsenal and the Spain national team.

Zubimendi began his career at Real Sociedad, making his first-team debut in 2019. He made over 200 appearances and won the 2019–20 Copa del Rey with the club. In July 2025, he signed for Arsenal for a reported initial fee of £55.8m.

Zubimendi made his senior debut for Spain in 2021, having previously represented them at various youth levels. He was part of Spain's victorious squads at the 2023 UEFA Nations League Finals, UEFA Euro 2024 and the 2026 FIFA World Cup.

== Early life ==
Zubimendi was born in San Sebastián. He is an only child. His mother is a teacher and his father is a retired university professor. He attended Zurriola Ikastola in San Sebastián. In addition to football, he also played chess in his youth, becoming a youth champion of Gipuzkoa at the age of 11. He played for local football team Antiguoko in the Donosti Cup from 2006 to 2013.

== Club career ==
=== Real Sociedad ===
Zubimendi joined Real Sociedad's youth setup in 2011. He made his senior debut with Real Sociedad C on 27 August 2016, playing the last seven minutes in a 0–0 Tercera División home draw against Durango.

On 25 July 2018, Zubimendi renewed his contract until 2022, and was definitely promoted to the reserves in Segunda División B. The following 28 April, he made his first team – and La Liga – debut, coming on as a late substitute for Rubén Pardo in a 2–1 home win over Getafe. On 24 July 2020, he renewed his contract with the Txuri-urdin until 2025, being definitively promoted to the main squad.

On 24 February 2022, Zubimendi scored his first goal in European competitions in a 3–1 home defeat against RB Leipzig during the Europa League knockout round play-offs. A month later, on 13 March, he scored his first La Liga goal in a 1–0 victory over Alavés. In October, he extended his contract with the club until 2027. On 20 September 2023, he made his Champions League debut in a 1–1 draw against Inter Milan.

=== Arsenal ===
On 6 July 2025, Zubimendi signed for Arsenal on a long-term contract in a deal reportedly worth around €65m (£55.8m). On 17 August, he made his debut for the club in a 1–0 win against Manchester United in the league. On 13 September, he netted his first goals by scoring a brace in a 3–0 victory over Nottingham Forest. His first goal in that game would go on to win the Premier League Goal of the Month award for September 2025. For his performances in September, Zubimendi was nominated for the Premier League Player of the Month award. He concluded his debut season by winning the Premier League title, becoming only the second player after Jens Lehmann in 2003–04 to achieve the feat while featuring in every league match.

== International career ==
Zubimendi playing for Spain at the 2026 FIFA World Cup final

Zubimendi represented the Spain under-19s in a friendly 2–1 loss to the Portugal under-19s on 15 November 2017.

Due to the isolation of some national team players following the positive COVID-19 test of Sergio Busquets, Spain's under-21 squad were called up for the international friendly against Lithuania on 8 June 2021. Zubimendi made his senior debut in the match.

On 7 June 2024, he was selected in the 26-man squad for UEFA Euro 2024. On 15 June, he made his first appearance in the Euros against Croatia as a substitute. He went on to play the full match against Albania on 24 June, and came off the bench in both the semi-final victory over France on 9 July and in the final against England on 14 July as Spain won the tournament.

On 25 May 2026, Zubimendi was named in Spain's squad for the 2026 FIFA World Cup. He had limited involvement in the tournament with Pedri, Dani Olmo, Fabián Ruiz and Rodri preferred for the midfield places, but came on as a substitute for Rodri in extra time of the final as Spain defeated Argentina to win the trophy.

== Style of play ==
Zubimendi's versatile style of play draws comparisons to renowned players, notably Sergio Busquets. He showcases composure and control, guiding plays and adjusting the game's tempo. His role involves initiating plays from deep positions, displaying precise decision-making. Zubimendi's aptitude for receiving passes and creating space is reminiscent of Busquets, reflecting a deep understanding of the game and the art of crafting opportunities. Additionally, his technical abilities, including dribbling and deep runs, align with top midfielders, while his ball retention in tight spaces mirrors qualities seen in players like Xabi Alonso and David Silva.

== Career statistics ==
=== Club ===
As of match played 7 November 2026

Appearances and goals by club, season and competition
Club	Season	League			National cup (Note: Includes Copa del Rey, FA Cup)		League cup (Note: Includes EFL Cup)		Europe		Other		Total	
Club	Season	Division	Apps	Goals	Apps	Goals	Apps	Goals	Apps	Goals	Apps	Goals	Apps	Goals
Real Sociedad B	2016–17	Segunda División B	3	0	—		—		—		—		3	0
Real Sociedad B	2017–18	Segunda División B	2	0	—		—		—		—		2	0
Real Sociedad B	2018–19	Segunda División B	20	1	—		—		—		—		20	1
Real Sociedad B	2019–20	Segunda División B	25	3	—		—		—		—		25	3
Real Sociedad B	Total		50	4	—		—		—		—		50	4
Real Sociedad	2018–19	La Liga	1	0	0	0	—		—		—		1	0
Real Sociedad	2019–20	La Liga	9	0	1 (Note: Appearance in 2020 Copa del Rey final (played in 2021))	0	—		—		—		10	0
Real Sociedad	2020–21	La Liga	31	0	2	0	—		7 (Note: Appearances in UEFA Europa League)	0	1 (Note: Appearance in Supercopa de España)	0	41	0
Real Sociedad	2021–22	La Liga	36	2	4	0	—		7	1	—		47	3
Real Sociedad	2022–23	La Liga	36	1	4	0	—		4	0	—		44	1
Real Sociedad	2023–24	La Liga	31	4	6	0	—		8 (Note: Appearances in UEFA Champions League)	0	—		45	4
Real Sociedad	2024–25	La Liga	36	2	4	0	—		8	0	—		48	2
Real Sociedad	Total		180	9	21	0	—		34	1	1	0	236	10
Arsenal	2025–26	Premier League	38	5	3	0	3	1	13	0	—		57	6
Arsenal	2026–27	Premier League	7	0	0	0	2	0	2	0	1 (Note: Appearance in FA Community Shield)	0	12	0
Arsenal	Total		45	5	3	0	5	1	15	0	1	0	69	6
Career total			275	18	24	0	5	1	49	1	2	0	355	20

=== International ===
As of match played 15 November 2026

Appearances and goals by national team and year
National team	Year	Apps	Goals
Spain	2021	1	0
Spain	2022	0	0
Spain	2023	3	0
Spain	2024	11	1
Spain	2025	9	2
Spain	2026	8	0
Total		32	3

As of match played 19 July 2026
Scores and results list Spain's goal tally first, score column indicates score after each Zubimendi goal.

List of international goals scored by Martín Zubimendi
No.	Date	Venue	Cap	Opponent	Score	Result	Competition
1	12 October 2024	Estadio Nueva Condomina, Murcia, Spain	13	Denmark	1–0	1–0	2024–25 UEFA Nations League A
2	8 June 2025	Allianz Arena, Munich, Germany	19	Portugal	1–0	2–2 (a.e.t.) (3–5 p)	2025 UEFA Nations League Finals
3	15 November 2025	Boris Paichadze Dinamo Arena, Tbilisi, Georgia	24	Georgia	2–0	4–0	2026 FIFA World Cup qualification

== Honours ==
Real Sociedad

- Copa del Rey: 2019–20

Arsenal

- Premier League: 2025–26
- FA Community Shield: 2026
- EFL Cup runner-up: 2025–26
- UEFA Champions League runner-up: 2025–26

Spain U23

- Summer Olympic silver medal: 2020

Spain

- FIFA World Cup: 2026
- UEFA European Championship: 2024
- UEFA Nations League: 2022–23; runner-up: 2024–25

Individual

- Arsenal Goal of the Month: September 2025
- Premier League Goal of the Month: September 2025
