= 2017–18 Deportivo Alavés season =

Deportivo Alavés
2017–18 season
- President: Alfonso Fernández
- Head coach: Abelardo
- Stadium: Mendizorrotza
- La Liga: 14th
- Copa del Rey: Quarter-final
- Top goalscorer: League: Munir (10); All: Munir (14)
Home colours	Away colours	Third colours

The 2017–18 Deportivo Alavés season saw the club participating in La Liga and the Copa del Rey.

== Players ==
=== First-team squad ===
As of 6 February 2018

Note: Flags indicate national team as defined under FIFA eligibility rules; some limited exceptions apply. Players may hold more than one non-FIFA nationality.

No.	Pos.	Nation	Player
1	GK	ESP	Fernando Pacheco
2	DF	ESP	Carlos Vigaray
3	DF	ESP	Rubén Duarte
4	DF	ESP	Alexis
5	DF	ESP	Víctor Laguardia (vice-captain)
6	DF	CHI	Guillermo Maripán
7	FW	ESP	Rubén Sobrino
9	FW	VEN	Christian Santos
10	FW	SWE	John Guidetti (on loan from Celta Vigo)
11	MF	ESP	Ibai
12	DF	BRA	Rodrigo Ely
13	GK	ESP	Antonio Sivera
14	FW	ESP	Burgui
15	FW	ESP	Bojan (on loan from Stoke City)

No.	Pos.	Nation	Player
16	MF	COL	Daniel Torres
17	MF	ESP	Alfonso Pedraza (on loan from Villarreal)
18	MF	ESP	Tomás Pina (on loan from Club Brugge)
19	MF	ESP	Manu García (captain)
20	DF	ESP	Héctor (on loan from Real Sociedad)
21	MF	PAR	Hernán Pérez (on loan from Espanyol)
22	MF	GHA	Mubarak Wakaso
23	MF	ESP	Álvaro Medrán (on loan from Valencia)
24	FW	ESP	Munir (on loan from Barcelona)
26	DF	ESP	Adrián Diéguez
28	MF	ESP	Víctor López
29	FW	BIH	Ermedin Demirović
32	DF	ESP	Martín Aguirregabiria

=== Out on loan ===
Note: Flags indicate national team as defined under FIFA eligibility rules; some limited exceptions apply. Players may hold more than one non-FIFA nationality.

No.	Pos.	Nation	Player
—	DF	ESP	Antonio Cristian (on loan to Rudeš until 30 June 2018)
—	DF	ESP	Einar Galilea (on loan to Rudeš until 30 June 2018)
—	MF	ESP	Juanan Entrena (on loan to Rudeš until 30 June 2018)
—	MF	ESP	Sergio Llamas (on loan to Real Unión until 30 June 2018)

No.	Pos.	Nation	Player
—	MF	ESP	Nando (on loan to Lorca until 30 June 2018)
—	MF	SRB	Aleksandar Katai (on loan to Chicago Fire until 30 June 2018)
—	FW	ANG	Anderson Emanuel (on loan to Rudeš until 30 June 2018)

== Pre-season and friendlies ==
Team 1	Score	Team 2
Alavés	0–0	Toulouse
Logroñés	0–1	Alavés
Alavés	3–0	Mirandés
Numancia	1–1	Alavés
Trabzonspor	2–0	Alavés
Levante	1–1	Alavés
Leganés	1–1	Alavés
Alavés	2–2	Athletic Bilbao

== Competitions ==
=== Overall ===
Competition	Final position
La Liga	14th
Copa del Rey	Quarter-finals

=== La Liga ===
==== League table ====
Pos	Team	Pld	W	D	L	GF	GA	GD	Pts
12	Real Sociedad	38	14	7	17	66	59	+7	49 (Note: Head-to-head points: Espanyol 8, Real Sociedad 4, Celta Vigo 4 (Espanyol 2–1 Real Sociedad, Real Sociedad 1–1 Espanyol, Espanyol 2–1 Celta Vigo, Celta Vigo 2–2 Espanyol, Real Sociedad 1–2 Celta Vigo, Celta Vigo 2–3 Real Sociedad).)
13	Celta Vigo	38	13	10	15	59	60	−1	49
14	Alavés	38	15	2	21	40	50	−10	47
15	Levante	38	11	13	14	44	58	−14	46
16	Athletic Bilbao	38	10	13	15	41	49	−8	43 (Note: Athletic Bilbao finished ahead of Leganés on head-to-head goal difference: Athletic Bilbao 2–0 Leganés, Leganés 1–0 Athletic Bilbao.)

Source: La Liga, Soccerway
Rules for classification: 1) Points; 2) Head-to-head points; 3) Head-to-head goal difference; 4) Goal difference; 5) Goals scored; 6) Fair-play points (Note: Head-to-head record is used only after all the matches between the teams in question have been played)

==== Matches ====
Win Draw Loss Fixtures

18 August 2017 1	Leganés	1–0	Alavés	Leganés
20:15 CEST (UTC+02:00)	Gabriel 24'	Report	Wakaso (yellow card) 23'	Stadium: Butarque; Attendance: 9,231; Referee: José Luis Munuera Montero

26 August 2017 2	Alavés	0–2	Barcelona	Vitoria-Gasteiz
18:15 CEST (UTC+02:00)	Wakaso (yellow card) 36'; Ely (yellow card) 38'	Report	Umtiti (yellow card) 32'; Roberto (yellow card) 41'; Piqué (yellow card) 45'; Messi 55', 66'	Stadium: Mendizorrotza; Attendance: 19,356; Referee: Carlos del Cerro Grande

10 September 2017 3	Celta Vigo	1–0	Alavés	Vigo
18:30 CEST (UTC+02:00)	Gómez 34', (yellow card) 90+3'; Jonny (yellow card) 44'; Aspas (yellow card) 52'; Jozabed (yellow card) 68'	Report	Vigaray (yellow card) 66'; Torres (yellow card) 80'; Alexis (yellow card) 86'; Ibai (yellow card) 89'	Stadium: Balaídos; Attendance: 6,133; Referee: Mario Melero López

17 September 2017 4	Alavés	0–3	Villarreal	Vitoria-Gasteiz
12:00 CEST (UTC+02:00)	Sobrino (yellow card) 80'; Pedraza (yellow card) 90+3'	Report	Bakambu 32', 62'; Rodri (yellow card) 45'; Bacca 52'; Ruiz (yellow card) 67'	Stadium: Mendizorrotza; Attendance: 18,124; Referee: Santiago Jaime Latre

20 September 2017 5	Deportivo La Coruña	1–0	Alavés	A Coruña
21:00 CEST (UTC+02:00)	Luisinho 45'	Report	Vigaray (yellow card) 50'; Maripán (yellow card) 62'	Stadium: Riazor; Attendance: 18,611; Referee: David Medié Jiménez

23 September 2017 6	Alavés	1–2	Real Madrid	Vitoria-Gasteiz
16:15	Vigaray (yellow card) 14'; García 40', (yellow card) 67'; Ely (yellow card) 45'; Medrán (yellow card) 61'; Torres (yellow card) 87'	Report	Ceballos 10', 43'; Carvajal (yellow card) 32'; Nacho (yellow card) 88'	Stadium: Mendizorrotza; Attendance: 19,559; Referee: Alberto Undiano Mallenco

30 September 2017 7	Levante	0–2	Alavés	Valencia
18:30 CEST (UTC+02:00)	Bardhi (yellow card) 61'; Boateng (yellow card) 78'	Report	Maripán (yellow card) 2'; Munir 33'; Vigaray (yellow card) 67'; García (yellow card) 71'; Medrán 81'	Stadium: Ciutat de València; Attendance: 18,528; Referee: David Fernández Borbalán

15 October 2017 8	Alavés	0–2	Real Sociedad	Vitoria-Gasteiz
18:30 CEST (UTC+02:00)	Duarte (yellow card) 90+1'	Report	Oyarzabal 77'; Elustondo 81'; Llorente (yellow card) 44'	Stadium: Mendizorrotza; Attendance: 19,840; Referee: Javier Alberola Rojas

21 October 2017 9	Real Betis	2–0	Alavés	Seville
16:15 CEST (UTC+02:00)	Sanabria 13'; García (yellow card) 30'; Amat (yellow card) 74'; Alexis 75' (o.g.)	Report	Munir (yellow card) 39'; Wakaso (yellow card) 77'	Stadium: Benito Villamarín; Attendance: 49,304; Referee: Daniel Trujillo Suárez

28 October 2017 10	Alavés	1–2	Valencia	Vitoria-Gasteiz
13:00 CEST (UTC+02:00)	Vigaray (yellow card) 23'; Santos (yellow card) 35'; Alexis 49'; Ely (yellow card) 65'; Diéguez (yellow card) 76'; García (yellow card) 86'	Report	Gabriel (yellow card) 17'; Zaza 34'; Rodrigo 66' (pen.)	Stadium: Mendizorrotza; Attendance: 16,638; Referee: José González González

4 November 2017 11	Alavés	1–0	Espanyol	Vitoria-Gasteiz
18:30 CET (UTC+01:00)	Santos 1', (yellow card) 79'; Diéguez (yellow card) 15'; Pedraza (yellow card) 26'; Pina (yellow card) 51'; Ely (yellow card) 58'; Medrán (yellow card) 74'; García (yellow card) 77'	Report	Hermoso (yellow card) 21' (yellow-red card) 39'	Stadium: Mendizorrotza; Attendance: 14,785; Referee: Pablo González Fuertes

18 November 2017 12	Getafe	4–1	Alavés	Getafe
13:00 CET (UTC+01:00)	Bergara 6'; Molina 9' (pen.); Djené (yellow card) 18'; Antunes (yellow card) 32'; Ángel 53', 64'; Jiménez (yellow card) 90+1'	Report	Diéguez (yellow card) 9'; Alexis (yellow card) 41'; Wakaso (yellow card) 63'; Santos 81'	Stadium: Coliseum Alfonso Pérez; Attendance: 9,893; Referee: Santiago Jaime Latre

25 November 2017 13	Alavés	1–2	Eibar	Vitoria-Gasteiz
13:00 CET (UTC+01:00)	Santos (yellow card) 24' (yellow-red card) 45'; Ely (yellow card) 37'; Munir (yellow card) 45'; Vigaray (yellow card) 71'; M. García (yellow card) 75'; Pacheco (yellow card) 81'; Burgui 90+1'	Report	Jordán 33'; D. García (yellow card) 42'; Capa (yellow card) 45'; Juncà (yellow card) 67'; Charles 69', (red card) 83'	Stadium: Mendizorrotza; Attendance: 19,272; Referee: José Luis Munuera Montero

4 December 2017 14	Girona	2–3	Alavés	Girona
21:00 CET (UTC+01:00)	Stuani 59'; Juanpe 62'; Bounou (yellow card) 87'	Report	Martín (yellow card) 27'; Duarte (yellow card) 57' Ibai 71', 87' (pen.), 90+3'	Stadium: Montilivi; Attendance: 7,316; Referee: Javier Alberola Rojas

8 December 2017 15	Alavés	2–0	Las Palmas	Vitoria-Gasteiz
21:00 CET (UTC+01:00)	Ibai 23'; Munir 55', (yellow card) 69'; Pina (yellow card) 57'	Report		Stadium: Mendizorrotza; Attendance: 18,567; Referee: David Medié Jiménez

17 December 2017 16	Atlético Madrid	1–0	Alavés	Madrid
20:45 CET (UTC+01:00)	Thomas (yellow card) 18'; Savić (yellow card) 34'; Godín (yellow card) 67'; Torres 74'	Report	Maripán (yellow card) 35'; Pina (yellow card) 55'; Duarte (yellow card) 61'; Alexis (yellow card) 86'	Stadium: Wanda Metropolitano; Attendance: 49,937; Referee: Jesús Gil Manzano

21 December 2017 17	Alavés	1–0	Málaga	Vitoria-Gasteiz
21:30 CET (UTC+01:00)	García (yellow card) 20'; Duarte (yellow card) 28'; Burgui (yellow card) 57'; Munir 60'	Report	Ontiveros (yellow card) 28'; Hernández (yellow card) 28'; Miquel (yellow card) 56'; Recio (yellow card) 70'	Stadium: Mendizorrotza; Attendance: 18,733; Referee: Alfonso Álvarez Izquierdo

7 January 2018 18	Athletic Bilbao	2–0	Alavés	Bilbao
18:30 CET (UTC+01:00)	Etxeita 8', (yellow card) 79'; Susaeta (yellow card) 53'; Aduriz 64' (pen.)	Report	Pedraza (yellow card) 12'; Martín (yellow card) 24'; Alexis (yellow card) 62'; Munir (yellow card) 64'	Stadium: San Mamés; Attendance: 41,070; Referee: Pablo González Fuertes

14 January 2018 19	Alavés	1–0	Sevilla	Vitoria-Gasteiz
16:15 CET (UTC+01:00)	Duarte (yellow card) 24' (yellow-red card) 83'; M. García 52', (yellow card) 90+2'; Pina (yellow card) 55'; Ely (yellow card) 90+3'	Report	Lenglet (yellow card) 65'; Kjær (yellow card) 72'	Stadium: Mendizorrotza; Attendance: 14,920; Referee: José María Sánchez Martínez

21 January 2018 20	Alavés	2–2	Leganés	Vitoria-Gasteiz
12:00 CET (UTC+01:00)	Munir 46'; Pedraza 52'; Ely (yellow card) 56' (yellow-red card) 87'; Pina (yellow card) 89'	Report	Eraso (yellow card) 22'; Mantovani (yellow card) 61'; Gabriel 75' (pen.); Zaldúa 90'; Amrabat (yellow card) 90+3'	Stadium: Mendizorrotza; Attendance: 15,002; Referee: Daniel Trujillo Suárez

28 January 2018 21	Barcelona	2–1	Alavés	Barcelona
20:45 CET (UTC+01:00)	L. Suárez 72'; Messi 84'	Report	Wakaso (yellow card) 22'; Guidetti 23'; Duarte (yellow card) 27'	Stadium: Camp Nou; Attendance: 62,369; Referee: Ignacio Iglesias Villanueva

3 February 2018 22	Alavés	2–1	Celta Vigo	Vitoria-Gasteiz
18:30 CET (UTC+01:00)	Pedraza 4'; Munir 18'; Sobrino (yellow card) 48'; Alexis (yellow card) 77'; Aguirregabiria (yellow card) 89'	Report	Radoja (yellow card) 21'; Jozabed (yellow card) 87'; Aspas 90+1'	Stadium: Mendizorrotza; Attendance: 19,437; Referee: Juan Martínez Munuera

11 February 2018 23	Villarreal	1–2	Alavés	Villarreal
13:00 CET (UTC+01:00)	Bacca (yellow card) 18', (goal) 77'; Castillejo (yellow card) 63'; Costa (yellow card) 70'; Raba (yellow card) 90+3'	Report	Laguardia (yellow card) 29'; Ely 39'; Duarte (yellow card) 54'; Guidetti (yellow card) 64'; Ibai 71'; Pacheco (yellow card) 84'	Stadium: La Cerámica; Attendance: 14,984; Referee: Daniel Trujillo Suárez

18 February 2018 24	Alavés	1–0	Deportivo La Coruña	Vitoria-Gasteiz
--:-- CET (UTC+01:00)	Munir 61'	Report		Stadium: Mendizorrotza; Attendance: 15,820; Referee: Mario Melero López

24 February 2018 25	Real Madrid	4–0	Alavés	Madrid
16:15	Ronaldo 44', 61'; Bale 46'; Llorente (yellow card) 82'; Benzema 89' (pen.)	Report	Pérez (yellow card) 5'; Sobrino (yellow card) 20'	Stadium: Santiago Bernabéu; Attendance: 65,228; Referee: Xavier Estrada Fernández

28 February 2018 26	Alavés	1–0	Levante	Vitoria-Gasteiz
21:30 CET (UTC+01:00)	Munir (yellow card) 30' (yellow-red card) 72'; Manu García (penalty missed); Laguardia 90'	Report	Chema (red card) 30'	Stadium: Mendizorrotza; Attendance: 16,812; Referee: David Fernández Borbalán

4 March 2018 27	Real Sociedad	2–1	Alavés	San Sebastián
21:30 CET (UTC+01:00)	Moreno 5'; Illarra 10'	Report	Alfonso Pedraza 38'	Stadium: Anoeta; Attendance: 21,334; Referee: Juan Martínez Munuera

12 March 2018 28	Alavés	1–3	Real Betis	Vitoria-Gasteiz
18:30 CET (UTC+01:00)	Sobrino 67'	[Report]	Loren 23', 78'; García 44'	Stadium: Mendizorrotza; Attendance: 17,239; Referee: Carlos del Cerro Grande

17 March 2018 29	Valencia	3–1	Alavés	Valencia
16:15 CEST (UTC+02:00)	Rodrigo 19'; Zaza 33'; Laguardia 54' (o.g.)	[Report]	Sobrino 49'	Stadium: Mestalla; Attendance: 35,413; Referee: José Luis Munuera Montero

1 April 2018 30	Espanyol	0–0	Alavés	Cornellà de Llobregat
21:00 CEST (UTC+02:00)		[Report]		Stadium: RCDE Stadium; Attendance: 15,1000; Referee: Ignacio Iglesias Villanueva

7 April 2018 31	Alavés	2–0	Getafe	Vitoria-Gasteiz
13:00 CEST (UTC+02:00)	Laguardia 48'; Munir 75'	[Report]		Stadium: Mendizorrotza; Attendance: 13,255; Referee: Santiago Jaime Latre

15 April 2018 32	Eibar	0–1	Alavés	Eibar
12:00 CEST (UTC+02:00)		Report	Guidetti 5'	Stadium: Ipurua; Attendance: 5,754; Referee: Alberto Undiano Mallenco

19 April 2018 33	Alavés	1–2	Girona	Vitoria-Gasteiz
19:30 CEST (UTC+02:00)	Pina 90'	[Report]	García 59'; Stuani 86' (pen.)	Stadium: Mendizorrotza; Attendance: 14,109; Referee: Pablo González Fuertes

22 April 2018 34	Las Palmas	0–4	Alavés	Las Palmas
18:30 CEST (UTC+02:00)		[Report]	Munir 51', 73'; Medrán 79'; Sobrino 90+1'	Stadium: Gran Canaria; Attendance: 7,083; Referee: Mario Melero López

29 April 2018 35	Alavés	0–1	Atlético Madrid	Vitoria-Gasteiz
16:15 CEST (UTC+02:00)		[Report]	Gameiro 78' (pen.)	Stadium: Mendizorrotza; Attendance: 18,944; Referee: David Fernández Borbalán

6 May 2018 36	Málaga	0–3	Alavés	Málaga
--:-- CEST (UTC+02:00)		[Report]	García 3'; Demirović 68'; Ibai 70'	Stadium: La Rosaleda; Attendance: 14,024; Referee: José González González

12 May 2018 37	Alavés	3–1	Athletic Bilbao	Vitoria-Gasteiz
18:30 CEST (UTC+02:00)	Maripán (yellow card) 32'; Munir (yellow card) 35' (goal) 60'; Guidetti 43'; Ibai 77'	Report	Beñat (yellow card) 27'; Saborit (yellow card) 34'; Yeray (yellow card) 58'; San José (yellow card) 73'; Muniain 79'; Martínez (yellow card) 90+3'	Stadium: Mendizorrotza; Attendance: 19,458; Referee: Javier Estrada (Catalonia)

19 May 2018 38	Sevilla	1–0	Alavés	Seville
18:30 CEST (UTC+02:00)	Ben Yedder 28'	[Report]		Stadium: Ramón Sánchez Pizjuán; Attendance: 22,513; Referee: Carlos del Cerro Grande

=== Copa del Rey ===
==== Round of 32 ====
24 October 2017 First leg	Getafe	0–1	Alavés	Getafe
20:30 CEST (UTC+02:00)	Mora (yellow card) 62'; Arambarri (yellow card) 85'; Fajr (yellow card) 90+2'	Report	Pina (yellow card) 22'; Diéguez (yellow card) 24'; Sobrino (yellow card) 37'; Duarte (yellow card) 61'; Santos 87'; Katai (yellow card) 90+1'; Sivera (yellow card) 90+2'	Stadium: Coliseum; Attendance: 7,731; Referee: David Fernández Borbalán

30 November 2017 Second leg	Alavés	3–0 (4–0 agg.)	Getafe	Vitoria-Gasteiz
19:00	Munir 3', 69'; Torres (yellow card) 13'; Bojan 31', (yellow card) 80'; Ely (yellow card) 47'	Report	Gorosito (yellow card) 42'; Portillo (yellow card) 44'	Stadium: Mendizorrotza; Attendance: 9,128; Referee: José González González

==== Round of 16 ====
3 January 2018	Formentera	1–3	Alavés	Sant Francesc Xavier
19:00 CET (UTC+01:00)	Rosa 57'	Report	Demirović 36', 65'; Munir 81'	Stadium: Municipal; Attendance: 1,100; Referee: Alejandro Hernández Hernández

10 January 2018	Alavés	2–0 (5–1 agg.)	Formentera	Vitoria-Gasteiz
19:30 CET (UTC+01:00)	Demirović 55'; Pedraza 90+1'	Report		Stadium: Mendizorrotza; Attendance: 8,467; Referee: Ignacio Iglesias Villanueva

==== Quarter-finals ====
17 January 2018	Valencia	2–1	Alavés	Valencia
19:00 CET (UTC+01:00)	Guedes (yellow card) 53', (goal) 73'; Rodrigo 82'; Mina (yellow card) 86'; Kondogbia (yellow card) 90+2'	Report	Pina (yellow card) 41'; Sobrino 66'; Diéguez (yellow card) 67' (yellow-red card) 77'	Stadium: Mestalla; Attendance: 31,338; Referee: José González González

24 January 2018	Alavés	2–1 (3–3 agg.) (2–3 p)	Valencia	Vitoria-Gasteiz
19:00 CET (UTC+01:00)	Torres (yellow card) 48'; Pedraza (yellow card) 66'; Munir 73', (yellow card) 80'; Sobrino 86'; Pina (yellow card) 90+6'; Duarte (yellow card) 90+7'	Report	Maksimović (yellow card) 50'; Vezo (yellow card) 61'; Mina 77', (yellow card) 90+13'; Kondogbia (yellow card) 79'; Parejo (yellow card) 85'; Guedes (yellow card) 90+3'	Stadium: Mendizorrotza; Attendance: 19,127; Referee: Alfonso Álvarez Izquierdo
	Penalties
	Pina (penalty scored); Pedraza (penalty missed); Pérez (penalty missed); Munir (penalty scored); Sobrino (penalty missed)		(penalty scored) Rodrigo; (penalty scored) Mina; (penalty missed) Kondogbia; (penalty scored) Gayà

== Statistics ==
=== Appearances and goals ===
Last updated on 19 May 2018

No.	Pos	Nat	Player	Total		La Liga		Copa del Rey	
No.	Pos	Nat	Player	Apps	Goals	Apps	Goals	Apps	Goals
Goalkeepers
1	GK	(Spain) ESP	Fernando Pacheco	38	0	37+1	0	0	0
13	GK	(Spain) ESP	Antonio Sivera	7	0	1	0	6	0
Defenders
2	DF	(Spain) ESP	Carlos Vigaray	13	0	9+3	0	1	0
3	DF	(Spain) ESP	Rubén Duarte	26	0	24	0	2	0
4	DF	(Spain) ESP	Alexis	30	1	25+3	1	2	0
5	DF	(Spain) ESP	Víctor Laguardia	19	2	17	2	2	0
6	DF	(Chile) CHI	Guillermo Maripán	22	0	17+2	0	3	0
12	DF	(Brazil) BRA	Rodrigo Ely	36	1	30+1	1	5	0
20	DF	(Spain) ESP	Héctor	1	0	0+1	0	0	0
26	DF	(Spain) ESP	Adrián Diéguez	11	0	6	0	5	0
32	DF	(Spain) ESP	Martín Aguirregabiria	25	0	20+1	0	3+1	0
Midfielders
11	MF	(Spain) ESP	Ibai	38	7	26+8	7	3+1	0
16	MF	(Colombia) COL	Daniel Torres	23	0	14+4	0	5	0
17	MF	(Spain) ESP	Alfonso Pedraza	37	4	27+6	3	2+2	1
18	MF	(Spain) ESP	Tomás Pina	33	1	28+2	1	3	0
19	MF	(Spain) ESP	Manu García	32	3	27+3	3	0+2	0
22	MF	(Ghana) GHA	Mubarak Wakaso	24	0	12+9	0	3	0
23	MF	(Spain) ESP	Álvaro Medrán	21	2	9+8	2	4	0
28	MF	(Spain) ESP	Víctor López	3	0	1	0	2	0
Forwards
7	FW	(Spain) ESP	Rubén Sobrino	33	5	15+13	3	5	2
9	FW	(Venezuela) VEN	Christian Santos	12	3	5+5	2	0+2	1
14	FW	(Spain) ESP	Burgui	25	1	12+11	1	1+1	0
10	FW	(Sweden) SWE	John Guidetti	19	3	15+2	3	2	0
15	FW	(Spain) ESP	Bojan	15	1	4+9	0	2	1
21	FW	(Paraguay) PAR	Hernán Pérez	12	0	4+6	0	1+1	0
24	FW	(Spain) ESP	Munir	37	14	28+5	10	1+3	4
29	FW	(Bosnia and Herzegovina) BIH	Ermedin Demirović	6	4	2+1	1	2+1	3
Players who have made an appearance or had a squad number this season but have left the club
27	DF	(Spain) ESP	Einar Galilea	0	0	0	0	0	0
8	MF	(Serbia) SRB	Aleksandar Katai	4	0	0+3	0	0+1	0
10	MF	(Paraguay) PAR	Óscar Romero	5	0	2+3	0	0	0
12	MF	(Spain) ESP	Sergio Llamas	0	0	0	0	0	0
23	MF	(Serbia) SRB	Nenad Krstičić	0	0	0	0	0	0
21	MF	(France) FRA	Enzo Fernández	4	0	1+1	0	1+1	0

=== Cards ===
Accounts for all competitions. Last updated on 26 December 2017.

No.	Pos.	Name	Yellow card	Red card
1	GK	(Spain) Fernando Pacheco	1	0
2	DF	(Spain) Carlos Vigaray	6	0
3	DF	(Spain) Rubén Duarte	5	0
4	DF	(Spain) Alexis	4	0
6	DF	(Chile) Guillermo Maripán	3	0
7	FW	(Spain) Rubén Sobrino	2	0
8	MF	(Serbia) Aleksandar Katai	1	0
9	FW	(Venezuela) Christian Santos	2	0
11	MF	(Spain) Ibai	1	0
12	DF	(Brazil) Rodrigo Ely	6	0
13	GK	(Spain) Antonio Sivera	1	0
14	FW	(Spain) Burgui	1	0
15	FW	(Spain) Bojan	1	0
16	MF	(Colombia) Daniel Torres	3	0
17	MF	(Spain) Alfonso Pedraza	2	0
18	MF	(Spain) Tomás Pina	4	0
19	MF	(Spain) Manu García	6	0
22	MF	(Ghana) Mubarak Wakaso	4	0
23	MF	(Spain) Álvaro Medrán	1	0
24	FW	(Spain) Munir	3	0
26	DF	(Spain) Adrián Diéguez	4	0
32	DF	(Spain) Martin Aguirregabiria	1	0

=== Clean sheets ===
Last updated on 26 December 2017.

Number	Nation	Name	Matches Played	La Liga	Copa del Rey	Total
1	(Spain)	Fernando Pacheco	16	3	0	3
13	(Spain)	Antonio Sivera	2	0	2	2
TOTALS				3	2	5
