= 2018–19 Deportivo Alavés season =

Alavés
2018–19 season
- President: Alfonso Fernández de Trocóniz
- Head coach: Abelardo
- Stadium: Mendizorrotza Stadium
- La Liga: 11th
- Copa del Rey: Round of 32
- Top goalscorer: League: Jonathan Calleri (9); All: Jonathan Calleri (9)
Home colours	Away colours	Third colours

The 2018–19 season was Deportivo Alavés's 107th season in existence and the club's 14th season in the top flight of Spanish football.

== Players ==
=== First-team squad ===
As of 30 August 2018

Note: Flags indicate national team as defined under FIFA eligibility rules; some limited exceptions apply. Players may hold more than one non-FIFA nationality.

No.	Pos.	Nation	Player
1	GK	ESP	Fernando Pacheco
2	DF	ESP	Carlos Vigaray
3	DF	ESP	Rubén Duarte
4	DF	BRA	Rodrigo Ely
5	DF	ESP	Víctor Laguardia (vice-captain)
6	DF	CHI	Guillermo Maripán
7	FW	ESP	Rubén Sobrino
8	MF	ESP	Tomás Pina
10	FW	SWE	John Guidetti
11	MF	ESP	Ibai
12	FW	ARG	Jonathan Calleri (on loan from Deportivo Maldonado)
13	GK	ESP	Antonio Sivera

No.	Pos.	Nation	Player
14	MF	ESP	Burgui
15	DF	ESP	Ximo Navarro
16	MF	COL	Daniel Torres
17	DF	ESP	Adrián Marín
18	FW	ESP	Borja Bastón (on loan from Swansea City)
19	MF	ESP	Manu García (captain)
20	MF	SRB	Darko Brašanac (on loan from Real Betis)
21	DF	ESP	Martín Aguirregabiria
22	MF	GHA	Mubarak Wakaso
23	MF	ESP	Jony (on loan from Málaga)
24	MF	GHA	Patrick Twumasi
26	DF	ESP	Adrián Diéguez

=== Out on loan ===
Note: Flags indicate national team as defined under FIFA eligibility rules; some limited exceptions apply. Players may hold more than one non-FIFA nationality.

No.	Pos.	Nation	Player
—	GK	ESP	Ioritz Landeta (at Istra until 30 June 2019)
—	GK	ESP	Aritz Castro (at San Ignacio until 30 June 2019)
—	DF	ESP	Antonio Cristian (at Fuenlabrada until 30 June 2019)
—	DF	ESP	Einar Galilea (at Sochaux until 30 June 2020)
—	DF	ESP	Lluis Llacer (at San Ignacio until 30 June 2019)
—	DF	ESP	Víctor López (at Logroñés until 30 June 2019)
—	DF	ESP	Rafa Páez (at Sochaux until 30 June 2019)
—	DF	ESP	Rafa Navarro (at Sochaux until 30 June 2019)
—	MF	ESP	Ato (at San Ignacio until 30 June 2019)

No.	Pos.	Nation	Player
—	MF	ESP	Nando (at Sochaux until 30 June 2019)
—	MF	ESP	Javi Muñoz (at Oviedo until 30 June 2019)
—	MF	ESP	Arturo Segado (at Istra until 30 June 2019)
—	FW	ANG	Anderson Emanuel (at Sochaux until 30 June 2019)
—	FW	BIH	Ermedin Demirović (at Sochaux until 30 June 2019)
—	FW	ALB	Eraldo Çinari (at Istra until 30 June 2019)
—	FW	ESP	Adrián Fuentes (at Istra until 30 June 2019)
—	FW	ESP	Dani Iglesias (at Istra until 30 June 2019)

== Transfers ==
=== In ===
No.	Pos.	Nat.	Name	Age	EU	Moving from	Type	Transfer window	Ends	Transfer fee	Source
8	MF	(Spain)	Tomás Pina	30	EU	(Belgium) Club Brugge	Transfer	Summer	2021	Undisclosed	Deportivo Alavés
10	FW	(Sweden)	John Guidetti	26	EU	Celta de Vigo	Transfer	Summer	2022	€4,000,000	Deportivo Alavés
15	DF	(Spain)	Ximo Navarro	28	EU	Las Palmas	Transfer	Summer	2021	Undisclosed	Deportivo Alavés
17	DF	(Spain)	Adrián Marín	21	EU	Villarreal	Transfer	Summer	2021	Undisclosed	Deportivo Alavés
18	FW	(Spain)	Borja Bastón	25	EU	(Wales) Swansea City	Loan	Summer	2019	Free	Deportivo Alavés
20	MF	(Serbia)	Darko Brašanac	26	EU	Betis	Loan	Summer	2019	Free	Deportivo Alavés
23	FW	(Spain)	Jony	26	EU	Málaga	Loan	Summer	2019	Free	Deportivo Alavés
24	MF	(Ghana)	Patrick Twumasi	24	Non-EU	(Kazakhstan) Astana	Transfer	Summer	2022	€3,000,000	Deportivo Alavés
	DF	(Spain)	Antonio Cristian	22	EU	(Croatia) NK Rudeš	End of Loan	Summer	2020	Free	
	DF	(Spain)	Einar Galilea	24	EU	(Croatia) NK Rudeš	End of Loan	Summer	2019	Free	
	DF	(Spain)	Rafa Páez	23	EU	(Croatia) Rudeš	End of Loan	Summer	2020	Free	
	DF	(Spain)	Rafa Navarro	24	EU	Betis	Transfer	Summer	2021	Free	Deportivo Alavés
	MF	(Spain)	Arturo Segado	21	EU	(Croatia) Rudeš	End of Loan	Summer	2020	Free	
	MF	(Spain)	Javi Muñoz	23	EU	Castilla	Transfer	Summer	2021	Free	Deportivo Alavés
	MF	(Spain)	Nando	24	EU	Lorca	End of Loan	Summer	2020	Free	
	MF	(Spain)	Sergio Llamas	25	EU	Real Unión	End of Loan	Summer	2019	Free	
	FW	(Angola)	Anderson Emanuel	22	EU	(Croatia) Rudeš	End of Loan	Summer	2022	Free	
	FW	(Spain)	Juanan Entrena	22	EU	(Croatia) Rudeš	End of Loan	Summer	2020	Free	

▼ Total spending: €7,000,000

=== Out ===
No.	Pos.	Nat.	Name	Age	EU	Moving to	Type	Transfer window	Transfer fee	Source
4	DF	(Spain)	Alexis	32	EU	(Saudi Arabia) Al-Ahli	End of Contract	Summer	Free	Deportivo Alavés
15	FW	(Spain)	Bojan	27	EU	(England) Stoke City	End of Loan	Summer	Free	
17	FW	(Spain)	Alfonso Pedraza	22	EU	Villarreal	End of Loan	Summer	Free	
18	MF	(Spain)	Tomás Pina	30	EU	(Belgium) Club Brugge	End of Loan	Summer	Free	
20	DF	(Spain)	Héctor	27	EU	Real Sociedad	End of Loan	Summer	Free	
21	FW	(Paraguay)	Hernán Pérez	29	EU	Espanyol	End of Loan	Summer	Free	
23	MF	(Spain)	Álvaro Medrán	24	EU	Valencia	End of Loan	Summer	Free	
24	FW	(Spain)	Munir	22	EU	Barcelona	End of Loan	Summer	Free	
29	FW	(Bosnia and Herzegovina)	Ermedin Demirović	20	EU	(France) Sochaux	Loan	Summer	Free	FC Sochaux-Montbéliard
	DF	(Spain)	Einar Galilea	24	EU	(France) Sochaux	Loan	Summer	Free	Deportivo Alavés
	DF	(Spain)	Rafa Páez	23	EU	(France) Sochaux	Loan	Summer	Free	FC Sochaux-Montbéliard
	DF	(Spain)	Rafa Navarro	24	EU	(France) Sochaux	Loan	Summer	Free	Deportivo Alavés
	MF	(Serbia)	Aleksandar Katai	27	EU	(United States) Chicago Fire	Transfer	Summer	Undisclosed	Chicago Fire
	MF	(Spain)	Javi Muñoz	23	EU	Oviedo	Loan	Summer	Free	Deportivo Alavés
	MF	(Spain)	Juanan Entrena	22	EU	(Cyprus) Omonia	Transfer	Summer	Undisclosed	AC Omonia
	MF	(Spain)	Nando	24	EU	(France) Sochaux	Loan	Summer	Free	FC Sochaux-Montbéliard
	MF	(Spain)	Sergio Llamas	25	EU		Rescinded	Summer	Free	Deportivo Alavés
	FW	(Angola)	Anderson Emanuel	22	EU	(France) Sochaux	Loan	Summer	Free	FC Sochaux-Montbéliard
	FW	(Venezuela)	Christian Santos	30	EU	Deportivo	Transfer	Summer	Free	Deportivo de La Coruña

▲ Total income: €0

Net income: ▼€7,000,000

== Pre-season and friendlies ==
Win Draw Loss

18 July 2018 Friendly	Racing Santander	0–0	Alavés	Santander
		Report		Stadium: El Sardinero

21 July 2018 Friendly	Alavés	1–1	Logroñés	Guardia
	Burgui	Report	Diéguez	Stadium: Campo de Futbol El Prao

25 July 2018 Friendly	Alavés	1–1	Leganés	Los Ángeles de San Rafael
	8 De la Fuente 70'	Report	Carrillo 25'	Stadium: Campos de Futbol ASR

28 July 2018 Friendly	Alavés	1–1	Alcorcón	Los Ángeles de San Rafael
	Diéguez 17'	Report	Sangalli 36'	Stadium: Campos de Futbol ASR

1 August 2018 Friendly	Numancia	3–1	Alavés	Soria
	Nacho 19'; Higinio 35'; Guillermo 71' (pen.)	Report	Ibai 33'	Stadium: Los Pajaritos; Attendance: 2,000

4 August 2018 Friendly	Valladolid	0–1	Alavés	El Berrón
		Report	Nacho 42' (o.g.)	Stadium: Estadio Sergio Sánchez; Attendance: 700

4 August 2018 Friendly	Alavés	1–0	Oviedo	El Berrón
	Burgui 30'	Report		Stadium: Estadio Sergio Sánchez; Attendance: 700

8 August 2018 Friendly	Real Sociedad	1–2	Alavés	Zarautz
	Sangalli 9'	Report	Zubeldia 3' (o.g.); Borja Bastón 50' (pen.)	Stadium: Estadio Asti Kirol Instalakuntzak; Referee: Palencia Caballero

11 August 2018 Friendly	Alavés	1–2	Huesca	Alegría-Dulantzi
	Guidetti 54'	Report	Gallar 8', 61'	Stadium: Campo Joaquín Gastaminza; Referee: Velasco Arbaiza

7 September 2018 Friendly	Alavés	0–0	Sochaux	Vitoria
		Report		Stadium: Mendizorrotza; Referee: Ricardo de Burgos Bengoetxea

7 September 2018 Friendly	Alavés	0–1	Real Sociedad	Vitoria
		Report	Juanmi 27'	Stadium: Mendizorrotza; Referee: Ricardo de Burgos Bengoetxea

== Competitions ==
Win Draw Loss

=== Overview ===
Competition	First match	Last match	Starting round	Final position	Record							
Competition	First match	Last match	Starting round	Final position	Pld	W	D	L	GF	GA	GD	Win %
La Liga	18 August 2018	19 May 2019	Matchday 1	11th	38	13	11	14	39	50	−11	34.21
Copa del Rey	31 October 2018	5 December 2018	Round of 32	Round of 32	2	0	1	1	3	4	−1	0.00
Total					40	13	12	15	42	54	−12	32.50

Last updated: 18 May 2019
Source: Competitions

=== La Liga ===
==== League table ====
Pos	Team	Pld	W	D	L	GF	GA	GD	Pts
9	Real Sociedad	38	13	11	14	45	46	−1	50 (Note: Real Sociedad finished ahead of Real Betis and Alavés on head-to-head points: Real Sociedad 6, Real Betis 5, Alavés 5. Real Betis finished ahead of Alavés on goal difference: Real Betis –8, Alavés –11.)
10	Real Betis	38	14	8	16	44	52	−8	50
11	Alavés	38	13	11	14	39	50	−11	50
12	Eibar	38	11	14	13	46	50	−4	47
13	Leganés	38	11	12	15	37	43	−6	45

Source: La Liga, Soccerway
Rules for classification: 1) Points; 2) Head-to-head points; 3) Head-to-head goal difference; 4) Goal difference; 5) Goals scored; 6) Fair-play points (Note: Head-to-head record is used only after all the matches between the teams in question have been played)

==== Results summary ====
Overall								Home						Away					
Pld	W	D	L	GF	GA	GD	Pts	W	D	L	GF	GA	GD	W	D	L	GF	GA	GD
38	13	11	14	39	50	−11	50	7	8	4	19	19	0	6	3	10	20	31	−11

Last updated: 18 May 2019.
Source: LaLiga

==== Results by round ====
Round	1	2	3	4	5	6	7	8	9	10	11	12	13	14	15	16	17	18	19	20	21	22	23	24	25	26	27	28	29	30	31	32	33	34	35	36	37	38
Ground	A	H	H	A	A	H	A	H	A	H	A	H	A	H	A	H	A	H	A	A	H	A	H	A	H	A	H	A	H	A	H	A	H	H	A	H	A	H
Result	L	D	W	W	W	D	L	W	W	W	L	W	L	D	L	D	W	W	D	L	L	L	W	D	D	W	D	W	L	L	D	L	D	L	D	L	L	W
Position	19	17	11	7	3	4	6	6	3	2	5	4	4	4	5	7	5	4	4	5	5	7	6	6	6	5	5	5	5	7	7	8	8	8	8	10	11	11

Updated to match(es) played on 18 May 2019. Source: LaLiga
A = Away; H = Home; W = Win; D = Draw; L = Loss

==== Matches ====
Win Draw Loss Fixtures

18 August 2018 1	Barcelona	3–0	Alavés	Barcelona
22:15 CEST (UTC+02:00)	Messi 64', 90+2'; Coutinho 83'	Report	Torres (yellow card) 10'; Maripán (yellow card) 41'	Stadium: Camp Nou; Attendance: 52,356; Referee: José María Sánchez Martínez

25 August 2018 2	Alavés	0–0	Real Betis	Vitoria-Gasteiz
18:15 CEST (UTC+02:00)	Wakaso (yellow card) 40'; M. García (yellow card) 47'; Aguirregabiria (yellow card) 70'	Report	Bartra (yellow card) 23'	Stadium: Mendizorrotza; Attendance: 12,490; Referee: Pablo González Fuertes

2 September 2018 3	Alavés	2–1	Espanyol	Vitoria-Gasteiz
18:15 CEST (UTC+02:00)	Wakaso (yellow card) 17'; Aguirregabiria (yellow card) 19'; Laguardia (yellow card) 39'; Pacheco (yellow card) 40'; Borja Bastón 57'; Sobrino 59'	Report	Baptistão 42' (pen.), (yellow card) 90+3'; Darder (yellow card) 44'; Iglesias (yellow card) 45'	Stadium: Mendizorrotza; Attendance: 13,102; Referee: Ignacio Iglesias Villanueva

16 September 2018 4	Valladolid	0–1	Alavés	Valladolid
18:30 CEST (UTC+02:00)	Anuar (yellow card) 41'; Nacho (yellow card) 50'; Plano (yellow card) 87'	Report	Brašanac (yellow card) 18'; Aguirregabiria (yellow card) 45'; Ibai 90+3'	Stadium: José Zorrilla; Attendance: 18,873; Referee: José Luis Munuera Montero

22 September 2018 5	Rayo Vallecano	1–5	Alavés	Madrid
13:00 CEST (UTC+02:00)	De Tomás 30'; Ba (red card) 35'; Imbula (yellow card) 90+4'	Report	Navarro 8'; Duarte (yellow card) 23'; Ibai 34', 77'; Calleri 56'; Aguirregabiria (yellow card) 83'; Burgui 90+5'	Stadium: Vallecas; Attendance: 12,011; Referee: Adrián Cordero Vega

27 September 2018 6	Alavés	1–1	Getafe	Vitoria-Gasteiz
20:00 CEST (UTC+02:00)	Wakaso (yellow card) 44'; Jony (yellow card) 82'; M. García (yellow card) 82'; Brašanac (yellow card) 89'; Calleri 90+3'	Report	Arambarri (yellow card) 75'; Amath 80'; Cabrera (yellow card) 90+5'	Stadium: Mendizorrotza; Attendance: 13,794; Referee: Eduardo Prieto Iglesias

30 September 2018 7	Levante	2–1	Alavés	Valencia
18:30 CEST (UTC+02:00)	Jason 19', (yellow card) 45'; Toño 36', (yellow card) 90+4'; Prcić (yellow card) 73'; Rochina (yellow card) 80'; Morales (yellow card) 85'; Chema (yellow card) 90+2'; Capaña (yellow card) 90+4'	Report	Sobrino 5', (yellow card) 86'	Stadium: Ciutat de València; Attendance: 20,239; Referee: Mario Melero López

6 October 2018 8	Alavés	1–0	Real Madrid	Vitoria-Gasteiz
18:30 CEST (UTC+02:00)	Wakaso (yellow card) 54'; M. García 90+5'	Report		Stadium: Mendizorrotza; Attendance: 19,461; Referee: Santiago Jaime Latre

19 October 2018 9	Celta Vigo	0–1	Alavés	Vigo
21:00 CEST (UTC+02:00)	Cabral (yellow card) 58'; Hjulsager (yellow card) 90+1'	Report	Laguardia (yellow card) 11'; Pina 58', (yellow card) 88'; Calleri (yellow card) 64'	Stadium: Abanca-Balaídos; Attendance: 15,805; Referee: Carlos del Cerro Grande

28 October 2018 10	Alavés	2–1	Villarreal	Vitoria-Gasteiz
18:30 CET (UTC+01:00)	Calleri 51'; Duarte (yellow card) 73'; Borja Baston 90+3'	Report	Moreno 10'; Ramiro Funes (yellow card) 27'	Stadium: Mendizorrotza; Attendance: 16,956; Referee: Guillermo Cuadra Fernández

4 November 2018 11	Eibar	2–1	Alavés	Eibar
12:00 CET (UTC+01:00)	Blasis (yellow card) 61' (yellow-red card) 62'; Jordán 69'; Orellana (yellow card) 73'; Arbilla (yellow card) 78'; Diop (yellow card) 88', (goal) 90+1'	Report	Jony 4'; Duarte (red card) 24'	Stadium: Ipurua; Attendance: 5,698; Referee: Ignacio Iglesias Villanueva

11 November 2018 12	Alavés	2–1	Huesca	Vitoria-Gasteiz
12:00 CET (UTC+01:00)	Jony 41'; Navarro (yellow card) 45+1'; Sobrino 68', (yellow card) 73'; Maripan (yellow card) 74'	Report	Gómez 35'; Semedo (yellow card) 45+1'; Musto (yellow card) 70'; Akapo (yellow card) 76'; Hernández (yellow card) 90+2'	Stadium: Mendizorrotza; Attendance: 14,554; Referee: José Luis Munuera Montero

23 November 2018 13	Leganés	1–0	Alavés	Leganés
21:00 CET (UTC+01:00)	Óscar (yellow card) 15'; En-Nesyri 42'; Nyom (yellow card) 62'	Report	Duarte (yellow card) 49'; Brašanac (yellow card) 52'; Aguirregabiria (yellow card) 73'; Borja Bastón (yellow card) 75'	Stadium: Butarque; Attendance: 8,917; Referee: Javier Alberola Rojas

2 December 2018 14	Alavés	1–1	Sevilla	Vitoria-Gasteiz
20:45 CET (UTC+01:00)	García (yellow card) 24'; Jony 37'; Pina (yellow card) 55'; Guidetti (yellow card) 90+3'	Report	Mesa (yellow card) 26'; Sarabia (yellow card) 39'; Ben Yedder 78'; Vázquez (yellow card) 84'	Stadium: Mendizorrotza; Attendance: 17,848; Referee: José María Sánchez Martínez

8 December 2018 15	Atlético Madrid	3–0	Alavés	Madrid
13:00 CET (UTC+01:00)	Kalinić (yellow card) 5', (goal) 25'; Correa (yellow card) 22'; Arias (yellow card) 58'; Thomas (yellow card) 79'; Griezmann 82'; Rodri 87'; Montero (yellow card) 90+1'	Report	Calleri (yellow card) 15'; Pina (yellow card) 16'; Navarro (yellow card) 37'; Laguardia (yellow card) 90+2'	Stadium: Wanda Metropolitano; Attendance: 55,810; Referee: Alejandro Hernández Hernández

17 December 2018 16	Alavés	0–0	Athletic Bilbao	Vitoria-Gasteiz
21:00 CET (UTC+01:00)	Duarte (yellow card) 58'; Borja (yellow card) 87'	Report	D. García (yellow card) 14'; Martínez (yellow card) 48'	Stadium: Mendizorrotza; Attendance: 19,349; Referee: Antonio Mateu Lahoz

21 December 2018 17	Real Sociedad	0–1	Alavés	San Sebastián
21:00 CET (UTC+01:00)	Zurutuza (yellow card) 25'; Merino (yellow card) 90+1'	Report	Calleri 11'; Pina (yellow card) 22'; Wakaso (yellow card) 34'; Duarte (yellow card) 76'; Maripán (yellow card) 90+4'	Stadium: Anoeta; Attendance: 22,431; Referee: Xavier Estrada Fernández

5 January 2019 18	Alavés	2–1	Valencia	Vitoria-Gasteiz
16:15 CET (UTC+01:00)	Laguardia (yellow card) 13'; Borja 21'; Navarro (yellow card) 25'; Pina 45+2'; Pacheco (yellow card) 82'	Report	Parejo 14'; Wass (yellow card) 22'; Diakhaby (yellow card) 46'; Torres (yellow card) 80'	Stadium: Mendizorrotza; Attendance: 18,304; Referee: David Medié Jiménez

12 January 2019 19	Girona	1–1	Alavés	Girona
18:30 CET (UTC+01:00)	Stuani 12', (yellow card) 61'; Douglas Luiz (yellow card) 40'; Pons (yellow card) 80'; Porro (yellow card) 90+3'	Report	Calleri (yellow card) 21'; Bastón 50'; Laguardia (yellow card) 52'	Stadium: Montilivi; Attendance: 10,303; Referee: José María Sánchez Martínez

18 January 2019 20	Getafe	4–0	Alavés	Getafe
21:00 CET (UTC+01:00)	Mata 33' (pen.), 88'; Molina 46', 55'	Report	Navarro (yellow card) 40'; Pina (yellow card) 62'; Duarte (yellow card) 77'; Wakaso (yellow card) 78'	Stadium: Coliseum Alfonso Pérez; Attendance: 8,748; Referee: José Luis Munuera Montero

28 January 2019 21	Alavés	0–1	Rayo Vallecano	Vitoria-Gasteiz
21:00 CET (UTC+01:00)	Maripán (yellow card) 57'; Pacheco (yellow card) 84'	Report	De Tomás 47'; Moreno (yellow card) 69'; Imbula (yellow card) 84'; Comesaña (yellow card) 85'; Medrán (yellow card) 89'; Bebé (yellow card) 90+1'	Stadium: Mendizorrotza; Attendance: 13,982; Referee: Mario Melero López

3 February 2019 22	Real Madrid	3–0	Alavés	Madrid
20:45 CET (UTC+01:00)	Benzema 30'; Vinícius 80'; Mariano 90+1'	Report	Laguardia (yellow card) 32'; Burgui (yellow card) 54'; Wakaso (yellow card) 74'	Stadium: Santiago Bernabéu; Attendance: 53,132; Referee: Santiago Jaime Latre

11 February 2019 23	Alavés	2–0	Levante	Vitoria-Gasteiz
21:00 CET (UTC+01:00)	Laguardia 23', (yellow card) 70'; Pina (yellow card) 48'; Brašanac (yellow card) 65'; Jony 90+3'	Report	Cabaco (yellow card) 44'; Luna (yellow card) 80'	Stadium: Mendizorrotza; Attendance: 13,691; Referee: Alberto Undiano Mallenco

17 February 2019 24	Real Betis	1–1	Alavés	Seville
20:45 CET (UTC+01:00)	Guardado (yellow card) 12'; Lo Celso 15'; Canales (yellow card) 44'; Lainez (yellow card) 73'; Mandi (yellow card) 83'	Report	Duarte (yellow card) 9'; Maripán 28'	Stadium: Benito Villamarín; Attendance: 43,455; Referee: Antonio Mateu Lahoz

23 February 2019 25	Alavés	0–0	Celta Vigo	Vitoria-Gasteiz
18:30 CET (UTC+01:00)	Navarro (yellow card) 45'; Duarte (yellow card) 59'	Report	Yokuşlu (yellow card) 54'; Mallo (yellow card) 70'	Stadium: Mendizorrotza; Attendance: 18,882; Referee: Carlos del Cerro Grande

2 March 2019 26	Villarreal	1–2	Alavés	Villarreal
16:15 CET (UTC+01:00)	Cazorla 61' (pen.); Álvaro (yellow card) 71'; Ruiz (yellow card) 89'	Report	Calleri (yellow card) 30'; Jony (yellow card) 40'; Maripán 54'; Laguardia (yellow card) 65'; Inui 77'	Stadium: Estadio de la Cerámica; Attendance: 15,488; Referee: José Luis Munuera Montero

9 March 2019 27	Alavés	1–1	Eibar	Vitoria-Gasteiz
13:00 CET (UTC+01:00)	Marín (yellow card) 53'; Inui 58'	Report	Escalante (yellow card) 26'; Cardona 71'	Stadium: Mendizorrotza; Attendance: 18,793; Referee: Javier Alberola Rojas

16 March 2019 28	Huesca	1–3	Alavés	Huesca
13:00 CET (UTC+01:00)	Ávila 14' (pen.); Ferreiro (yellow card) 38'	Report	Calleri 11' (pen.), 86'; Laguardia (yellow card) 33'; Guidetti 80'; Maripán (yellow card) 89'; Pina (yellow card) 90+1'	Stadium: El Alcoraz; Attendance: 6,811; Referee: Alberto Undiano Mallenco

30 March 2019 29	Alavés	0–4	Atlético Madrid	Vitoria-Gasteiz
20:45 CEST (UTC+02:00)	Pina (yellow card) 50'; García (yellow card) 56'	Report	Saúl 5'; Costa 11'; Lemar (yellow card) 55'; Morata 59'; Thomas 84'; Juanfran (yellow card) 88'	Stadium: Mendizorrotza; Attendance: 16,665; Referee: Mario Melero López

4 April 2019 30	Sevilla	2–0	Alavés	Seville
19:30 CEST (UTC+02:00)	Navas (yellow card) 39'; Mesa 41', (yellow card) 54'; Escudero (yellow card) 45'; Sarabia 80'	Report	Wakaso (yellow card) 46'; Pina (yellow card) 60'; Borja (yellow card) 67'; Navarro (yellow card) 70'	Stadium: Ramón Sánchez Pizjuán; Attendance: 33,212; Referee: Juan Martínez Munuera

7 April 2019 31	Alavés	1–1	Leganés	Vitoria-Gasteiz
12:00 CEST (UTC+02:00)	Calleri 18' (pen.); Pina (yellow card) 32'; García (yellow card) 48'; Aguirregabiria (yellow card) 48'; Duarte (yellow card) 69'; Ely (yellow card) 76'; Twumasi (yellow card) 87'	Report	Bustinza (yellow card) 17'; Eraso (yellow card) 19'; Gumbau (yellow card) 44'; Silva (yellow card) 58', (goal) 90+3'	Stadium: Mendizorrotza; Attendance: 16,783; Referee: Antonio Mateu Lahoz

13 April 2019 32	Espanyol	2–1	Alavés	Barcelona
13:00 CEST (UTC+02:00)	Pedrosa 19'; Naldo (yellow card) 21'; Laguardia 47' (o.g.); Darder (yellow card) 53'; Roca (yellow card) 84'	Report	Duarte (yellow card) 39'; Calleri 56'; Laguardia (yellow card) 79'	Stadium: RCDE Stadium; Attendance: 17,522; Referee: Ignacio Iglesias Villanueva

19 April 2019 33	Alavés	2–2	Valladolid	Vitoria-Gasteiz
21:00 CEST (UTC+02:00)	Guidetti 4', (yellow card) 81'; Jony 24'; Calleri (yellow card) 54'; Marín (yellow card) 63'	Report	Joaquín 38', (yellow card) 69'; Calero (yellow card) 73'; Ünal 76' (pen.), (yellow card) 85'; Míchel (yellow card) 80'; Antoñito (yellow card) 82'	Stadium: Mendizorrotza; Attendance: 10,822; Referee: Xavier Estrada Fernández

23 April 2019 34	Alavés	0–2	Barcelona	Vitoria-Gasteiz
21:30 CEST (UTC+02:00)	Jony (yellow card) 33'; Navarro (yellow card) 56'; Pina (yellow card) 90+4'	Report	Aleñá 54'; Suárez 60' (pen.); Coutinho (yellow card) 76'	Stadium: Mendizorrotza; Attendance: 18,735; Referee: Adrián Cordero Vega

27 April 2019 35	Athletic Bilbao	1–1	Alavés	Bilbao
13:00 CEST (UTC+02:00)	R. García (yellow card) 34'; Beñat 41'; San José (yellow card) 45'	Report	Laguardia (yellow card) 32'; Vigaray (yellow card) 44'; Borja 45'	Stadium: San Mamés; Attendance: 40,402; Referee: Jesús Gil Manzano

4 May 2019 36	Alavés	0–1	Real Sociedad	Vitoria-Gasteiz
18:30 CEST (UTC+02:00)	Wakaso (yellow card) 47'	Report	Willian José 24'; Pardo (yellow card) 73'; Merino (yellow card) 80'; Zubeldia (yellow card) 89'	Stadium: Mendizorrotza; Attendance: 18,509; Referee: Javier Alberola Rojas

12 May 2019 37	Valencia	3–1	Alavés	Valencia
18:30 CEST (UTC+02:00)	Soler 29'; Mina 34'; Garay (yellow card) 45'; Gabriel (yellow card) 64'; Gameiro 68'	Report	Navarro 12'; Brašanac (yellow card) 17'; Pina (yellow card) 35'; Borja (yellow card) 72'; Laguardia (yellow card) 89'; Twumasi (yellow card) 90+3'	Stadium: Mestalla; Attendance: 37,744; Referee: Guillermo Cuadra Fernández

18 May 2019 38	Alavés	2–1	Girona	Vitoria-Gasteiz
20:45 CEST (UTC+02:00)	Wakaso 40'; Pina (yellow card) 33'; Calleri (yellow card) 55', (goal) 83'; Rolán (yellow card) 56'	Report	Soni (yellow card) 33'; Muniesa (yellow card) 58'; Planas (yellow card) 64'; Portu 86'	Stadium: Mendizorrotza; Attendance: 11,549; Referee: Mario Melero López

=== Copa del Rey ===
==== Round of 32 ====
31 October 2018 First leg	Alavés	2–2	Girona	Vitoria-Gasteiz
20:30 CET (UTC+01:00)	Sobrino 63'; Aguirregabiria 88'; Diéguez (yellow card) 90+3'	Report	Alcalá 18'; Soni (yellow card) 65'; Montes 90+6'	Stadium: Mendizorrotza; Attendance: 9,346; Referee: Adrián Cordero Vega

5 December 2018 Second leg	Girona	2–1 (4–3 agg.)	Alavés	Girona
19:30 CET (UTC+01:00)	Juanpe (yellow card) 33'; Granell 74'; Portu 79'; García (yellow card) 82'	Report	Diéguez (yellow card) 17'; Guidetti (yellow card) 56'; Alcalá 62' (o.g.); Marín (yellow card) 68'	Stadium: Montilivi; Attendance: 9,290; Referee: Antonio Mateu Lahoz

== Statistics ==
=== Appearances and goals ===
Last updated on 18 May 2019.

No.	Pos	Nat	Player	Total		La Liga		Copa del Rey	
No.	Pos	Nat	Player	Apps	Goals	Apps	Goals	Apps	Goals
Goalkeepers
1	GK	(Spain) ESP	Fernando Pacheco	35	0	35	0	0	0
13	GK	(Spain) ESP	Antonio Sivera	5	0	3	0	2	0
Defenders
2	DF	(Spain) ESP	Carlos Vigaray	10	0	7+1	0	2	0
3	DF	(Spain) ESP	Rubén Duarte	33	0	33	0	0	0
4	DF	(Brazil) BRA	Rodrigo Ely	5	0	5	0	0	0
5	DF	(Spain) ESP	Víctor Laguardia	36	1	36	1	0	0
6	DF	(Chile) CHI	Guillermo Maripán	25	2	22+1	2	2	0
15	DF	(Spain) ESP	Ximo Navarro	31	2	28+3	2	0	0
17	DF	(Spain) ESP	Adrián Marín	7	0	2+4	0	1	0
21	DF	(Spain) ESP	Martín Aguirregabiria	28	1	23+4	0	1	1
Midfielders
8	MF	(Spain) ESP	Tomás Pina	28	2	27+1	2	0	0
11	MF	(Japan) JPN	Takashi Inui	12	2	10+2	2	0	0
14	MF	(Spain) ESP	Burgui	18	1	5+11	1	2	0
19	MF	(Spain) ESP	Manu García	35	1	25+9	1	1	0
20	MF	(Serbia) SRB	Darko Brašanac	26	0	17+7	0	2	0
22	MF	(Ghana) GHA	Mubarak Wakaso	29	1	18+11	1	0	0
23	MF	(Spain) ESP	Jony	37	5	34+2	5	0+1	0
24	MF	(Ghana) GHA	Patrick Twumasi	13	0	0+11	0	0+2	0
Forwards
7	FW	(Spain) ESP	Álex Blanco	2	0	0+2	0	0	0
9	FW	(Uruguay) URU	Diego Rolán	9	0	3+6	0	0	0
10	FW	(Sweden) SWE	John Guidetti	24	2	6+16	2	2	0
12	FW	(Argentina) ARG	Jonathan Calleri	36	9	33+1	9	0+2	0
18	FW	(Spain) ESP	Borja Bastón	29	5	18+9	5	2	0
Players who have left the club during the season
7	FW	(Spain) ESP	Rubén Sobrino	22	4	10+10	3	2	1
11	MF	(Spain) ESP	Ibai	19	3	17+1	3	0+1	0
16	MF	(Colombia) COL	Daniel Torres	3	0	1+1	0	1	0
26	DF	(Spain) ESP	Adrián Diéguez	2	0	0	0	2	0

=== Cards ===
Accounts for all competitions. Last updated on 12 January 2019.

No.	Pos.	Name	Yellow card	Red card
1	GK	(Spain) Fernando Pacheco	2	0
3	DF	(Spain) Rubén Duarte	5	1
5	DF	(Spain) Víctor Laguardia	5	0
6	DF	(Chile) Guillermo Maripán	3	0
7	FW	(Spain) Rubén Sobrino	2	0
8	MF	(Spain) Tomás Pina	4	0
10	FW	(Sweden) John Guidetti	2	0
12	FW	(Argentina) Jonathan Calleri	3	0
15	DF	(Spain) Ximo Navarro	3	0
16	MF	(Colombia) Daniel Torres	1	0
17	DF	(Spain) Adrián Marín	1	0
18	FW	(Spain) Borja Bastón	2	0
19	MF	(Spain) Manu García	4	0
20	MF	(Serbia) Darko Brašanac	3	0
21	DF	(Spain) Martín Aguirregabiria	4	0
22	MF	(Ghana) Mubarak Wakaso	5	0
23	MF	(Spain) Jony	1	0
26	DF	(Spain) Adrián Diéguez	2	0

=== Clean sheets ===
Last updated on 12 January 2019.

Number	Nation	Name	Matches Played	La Liga	Copa del Rey	Total
1	(Spain)	Fernando Pacheco	17	6	0	6
13	(Spain)	Antonio Sivera	4	0	0	0
TOTALS				6	0	6
