= Manu García (footballer, born 1986) =

Spanish footballer

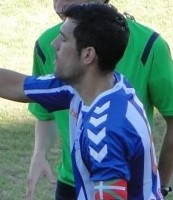
- García with Alavés in 2016

Personal information
- Full name: Manuel Alejandro García Sánchez
- Date of birth: 26 April 1986 (age 40)
- Place of birth: Vitoria, Spain
- Height: 1.82 m (5 ft 11 1/2 in)
- Position: Midfielder

Youth career
- Real Sociedad

Senior career*
Years	Team	Apps	(Gls)
2005–2008	Real Sociedad B	101	(18)
2008–2010	Eibar	35	(6)
2008–2009	→ Real Unión (loan)	29	(8)
2010–2012	Logroñés	53	(13)
2012–2021	Alavés	282	(19)
2021–2022	Aris Limassol	23	(0)
2022–2023	Mirandés	25	(2)
Total		548	(66)

International career
2003	Spain U17	1	(0)
2016–2020	Basque Country	4	(0)
Medal record
Representing Spain
Men's football
UEFA European Under-17 Championship
Runner-up	2003 Portugal
- * Club domestic league appearances and goals

Manuel "Manu" Alejandro García Sánchez (born 26 April 1986) is a Spanish former professional footballer. Mainly a central midfielder, he could also play as a winger or a left-back.

He spent the better part of his career with Alavés after signing in 2012, appearing in 308 competitive matches and winning the 2015–16 Segunda División. In La Liga, he totalled 144 games and eight goals over five seasons with the club.

== Club career ==
=== Early career ===
Born in Vitoria-Gasteiz, Álava, García finished his development at Real Sociedad, and made his senior debut with the reserves in the 2005–06 season, in the Segunda División B. In July 2008 he signed for Segunda División club SD Eibar, but was immediately loaned to Real Unión in the third tier.

García featured regularly during his loan spell, scoring eight goals to help his team to return to division two after 44 years. In July 2009 he rejoined the Armeros, who in turn had suffered relegation. Despite being an undisputed starter during the campaign, he was deemed surplus to requirements in July 2010.

On 30 December 2010, García joined fellow third-division side UD Logroñés. In 2011–12 he netted a career-best seven goals, as they finished two points short of the play-offs.

=== Alavés ===
In June 2012, García moved to Deportivo Alavés, the club he supported as a child. He was ever-present in his first year, appearing in 37 league matches to help his team to achieve promotion to the second division in the playoffs.

García appeared in his first game as a professional on 24 August 2013, a 1–1 home draw against UD Las Palmas. He scored his first professional goal on 15 September 2013, in a 2–1 away loss to Real Murcia. On 2 July 2014, he signed a new two-year contract with the Basques.

García contributed 37 appearances and five goals in 2015–16, and Alavés returned to La Liga after ten years. He made his debut in the league on 21 August, starting and scoring a last-minute equaliser in a 1–1 draw at Atlético Madrid.

On 6 October 2018, after having come on as a 74th-minute substitute for Mubarak Wakaso, García netted 21 minutes later from a corner kick to help his team to get their first win against Real Madrid in 88 years. On 26 May 2021, after nine years at the Mendizorrotza Stadium, the 35-year-old left the club.

=== Aris Limassol and Mirandés ===
On 9 August 2021, García signed for Aris Limassol FC in the Cypriot First Division. He returned to his home country one year later, on a one-year deal at CD Mirandés.

== Career statistics ==
As of match played 23 May 2021

Appearances and goals by club, season and competition
Club	Season	League			National Cup		Other		Total	
Club	Season	Division	Apps	Goals	Apps	Goals	Apps	Goals	Apps	Goals
Real Sociedad B	2005–06	Segunda División B	31	5	—		2 (Note: Appearances in Segunda División B play-offs)	0	33	5
Real Sociedad B	2006–07	Segunda División B	34	3	—		—		34	3
Real Sociedad B	2007–08	Segunda División B	36	10	—		—		36	10
Real Sociedad B	Total		101	18	0	0	2	0	103	18
Eibar	2009–10	Segunda División B	35	6	1	0	3	0	39	6
Real Unión (loan)	2008–09	Segunda División B	29	8	6	0	4	0	39	8
Logroñés	2010–11	Segunda División B	19	6	0	0	—		19	5
Logroñés	2011–12	Segunda División B	34	7	3	3	—		37	10
Logroñés	Total		53	13	3	3	0	0	56	15
Alavés	2012–13	Segunda División B	33	3	5	0	4	0	42	3
Alavés	2013–14	Segunda División	38	3	1	0	—		39	3
Alavés	2014–15	Segunda División	30	0	3	0	—		33	0
Alavés	2015–16	Segunda División	37	5	2	0	—		39	5
Alavés	2016–17	La Liga	25	3	6	0	—		31	3
Alavés	2017–18	La Liga	30	3	2	0	—		32	3
Alavés	2018–19	La Liga	34	2	1	0	—		35	2
Alavés	2019–20	La Liga	30	0	0	0	—		30	0
Alavés	2020–21	La Liga	25	0	2	0	—		27	0
Alavés	Total		282	19	22	0	4	0	308	10
Career total			500	64	32	3	13	0	545	67

== Honours ==
Alavés

- Segunda División: 2015–16
- Copa del Rey runner-up: 2016–17

Individual

- Segunda División Player of the Month: May 2016
