= Rodrigo Ely =

Brazilian footballer (born 1993)

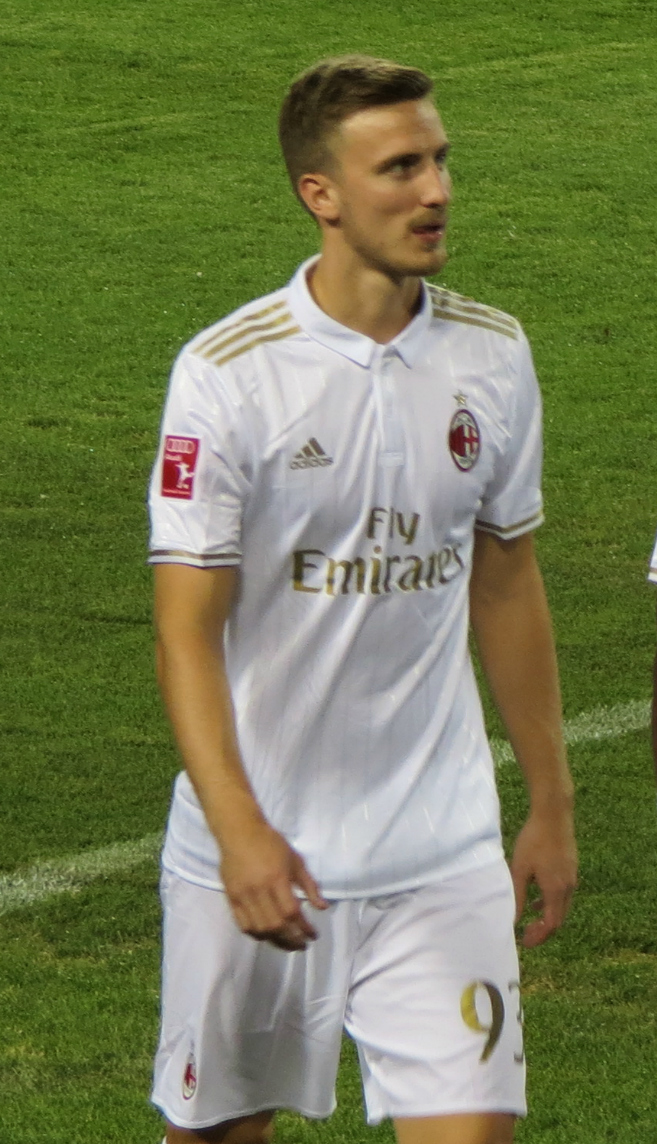
- Ely playing for Milan in 2016

Personal information
- Full name: Rodrigo Ely
- Date of birth: 3 November 1993 (age 33)
- Place of birth: Lajeado, Brazil
- Height: 1.91 m (6 ft 3 in)
- Position: Centre back

Team information
- Current team: Almería
- Number: 5

Youth career
- 2011–2012: Grêmio

Senior career*
Years	Team	Apps	(Gls)
2012–2014	Milan	0	(0)
2012–2013	→ Reggina (loan)	27	(1)
2013–2014	→ Varese (loan)	37	(0)
2014–2015	Avellino	30	(0)
2015–2017	Milan	3	(0)
2017	→ Alavés (loan)	10	(1)
2017–2021	Alavés	69	(4)
2021–2022	Nottingham Forest	0	(0)
2022–2023	Almería	48	(3)
2023–2026	Grêmio	45	(1)
2026–	Almería	12	(0)

International career^{‡}
2011–2012	Italy U19	7	(0)
2012	Italy U20	3	(0)
2014–2016	Brazil U23	3	(0)
- * Club domestic league appearances and goals as of 3 June 2026 ‡ National team caps and goals as of 8 June 2017

Rodrigo Ely (born 3 November 1993) is a Brazilian professional footballer who plays as a central defender for Spanish club UD Almería.

== Club career ==
=== Milan ===
Rodrigo Ely is a youth product of Brazilian club, Grêmio, and joined Milan in 2012. He spent two years with the youth side before subsequent loan spells with several low tier Italian clubs.

==== Reggina / Varese (loan) ====
On 24 July 2012, Ely joined Reggina on a season-long loan. On 16 July 2013, AC Milan confirmed that they had reached an agreement for the season-long loan of Ely to Varese.

=== Avellino ===
On 21 July 2014, Ely joined Avellino on a free transfer.

=== Return to Milan ===
After impressive performances with Avellino in the 2014–15 season, Milan decided to bring him back to San Siro on 10 June 2015, where he signed new contract which will keep him at the club until 30 June 2019. Despite Ely being a free agent, Milan also paid an unknown party a €8 million fee.

He made his first Serie A game of the 2015–16 season with Milan, in a 2–0 defeat against Fiorentina, where he received two yellow cards, thus getting sent off.

=== Alavés ===
On 30 January 2017, Ely joined La Liga club Deportivo Alavés on loan for the remainder of the season. He made his debut for the club on 11 March, replacing Ibai Gómez in a 2–1 away win against Málaga CF.

On 17 April 2017, Ely scored his first goal in the main category, netting his team's second in a 2–1 home win against Villarreal CF. On 21 July, he signed a permanent four-year deal with the Basque side.

=== Nottingham Forest ===
On 2 September 2021, Ely signed a one-year deal with EFL Championship side Nottingham Forest as a free transfer. On 31 January 2022, it was announced that Forest and Ely had mutually agreed to terminate his contract at the club, without him having made an appearance.

=== Almería ===
On 7 March 2022, free agent Ely signed a three-month contract with UD Almería back in Spain, with an option for a further two years.

=== Grêmio ===
On 1 August 2023, Ely agreed to a two-and-a-half-year contract with his first club Grêmio, pending on medical examinations. On 30 January 2026, he terminated his link with the club.

=== Almería return ===
On 2 February 2026, Ely returned to Almería on a six-month contract.

== International career ==
Ely played for Italy at Under-19 and Under-20, but was called up by Alexandre Gallo to be a part of his Brazil Under-23 squad, which was preparing to compete at Rio 2016.

== Career statistics ==
As of match played 5 August 2024

Club	Season	League			National Cup		Continental		Other		Total	
Club	Season	Division	Apps	Goals	Apps	Goals	Apps	Goals	Apps	Goals	Apps	Goals
Reggina (loan)	2012–13	Serie B	27	1	3	0	—		—		30	1
Varese (loan)	2013–14	Serie B	37	0	2	0	—		2 (Note: Appearance(s) in Relegation Playoffs)	0	41	0
Avellino	2014–15	Serie B	30	0	2	0	—		3 (Note: Appearance(s) in Promotion Playoffs)	0	35	0
Milan	2015–16	Serie A	3	0	1	0	—		—		4	0
Milan	2016–17	Serie A	0	0	0	0	—		—		0	0
Milan	Total		3	0	1	0	—		—		4	0
Alavés (loan)	2016–17	La Liga	10	1	1	0	—		—		11	1
Alavés	2017–18	La Liga	31	1	5	0	—		—		36	1
Alavés	2018–19	La Liga	5	0	0	0	—		—		5	0
Alavés	2019–20	La Liga	25	2	0	0	—		—		25	2
Alavés	2020–21	La Liga	8	1	0	0	—		—		8	1
Alavés	Total		79	5	6	0	—		—		85	5
Almería	2021–22	Segunda División	12	3	0	0	—		—		12	3
Almería	2022–23	La Liga	36	0	0	0	—		—		36	0
Almería	Total		48	3	0	0	—		—		48	3
Grêmio	2023	Série A	9	0	1	0	—		—		10	0
Grêmio	2024	Série A	13	1	2	0	5	0	8 (Note: Appearances in Campeonato Gaúcho)	0	28	1
Grêmio	Total		22	1	3	0	5	0	8	0	38	1
Career Total			246	10	17	0	5	0	13	0	281	10

== Honours ==
=== Club ===
Milan

- Supercoppa Italiana: 2016

Alavés

- Copa del Rey: 2016-17 Runner-up

Grêmio

- Campeonato Gaúcho: 2024
