= Fernando Pacheco =

Spanish footballer

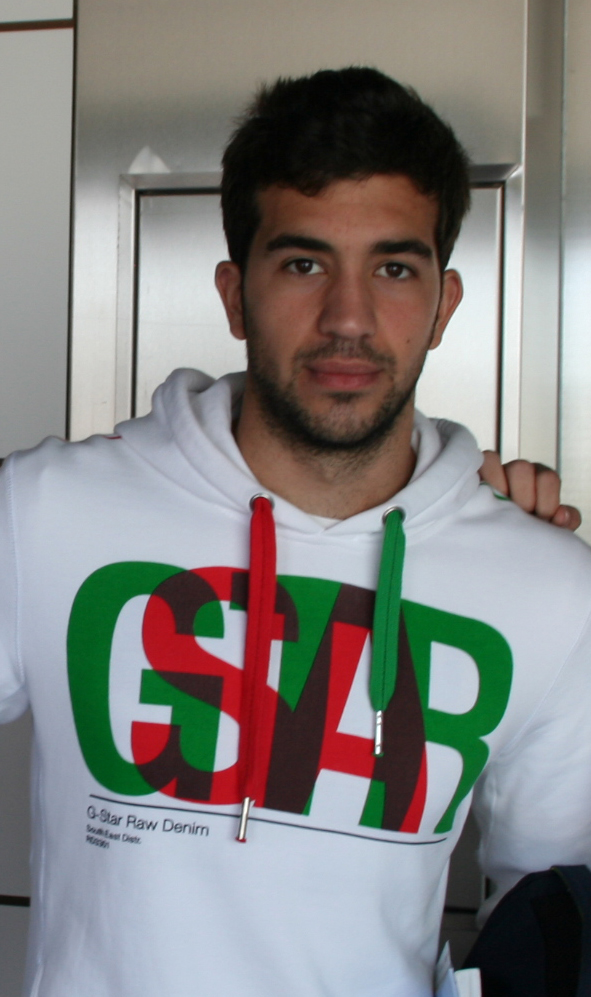
- Pacheco in 2014

Personal information
- Full name: Fernando Pacheco Flores
- Date of birth: 18 May 1992 (age 34)
- Place of birth: Badajoz, Spain
- Height: 1.86 m (6 ft 1 in)
- Position: Goalkeeper

Youth career
- 1998–2004: Obandino
- 2004–2006: Flecha Negra
- 2006–2011: Real Madrid

Senior career*
Years	Team	Apps	(Gls)
2011–2013	Real Madrid C	45	(0)
2011–2014	Real Madrid	0	(0)
2012–2014	Real Madrid B	41	(0)
2015–2022	Alavés	248	(0)
2022–2023	Almería	1	(0)
2023–2025	Espanyol	44	(0)
2025–2026	Al Fateh	31	(0)

International career
2011	Spain U19	1	(0)
2011	Spain U20	4	(0)
2013–2014	Spain U21	8	(0)
- * Club domestic league appearances and goals as of 18:00, 14 May 2026 (UTC)

Fernando Pacheco Flores (born 18 May 1992) is a Spanish professional footballer who plays as a goalkeeper.

Developed at Real Madrid, where he played only two Copa del Rey games for the first team, he spent most of his career at Alavés after signing in 2015, making 253 appearances. In La Liga, he also featured for Almería and Espanyol.

== Club career ==
=== Real Madrid ===
Born in Badajoz, Extremadura, Pacheco played for two local clubs before joining Real Madrid in 2006, aged 14. He made his senior debut on 28 August 2011 with the C team, playing in the Tercera División against CF Rayo Majadahonda.

Pacheco appeared in his first game with the main squad on 20 December 2011, coming on as a late substitute for fellow youth graduate Antonio Adán in a 5–1 home victory over SD Ponferradina in the round of 32 of the Copa del Rey. In 2012–13, he alternated between starting duties in the third side and the occasional callup to the second, making his debut in the Segunda División on 2 June 2013 in a 4–0 home win against AD Alcorcón. He kept his position the following match – the final in the second-tier campaign – at Girona FC.

Pacheco made his first start for the first team on 2 December 2014, in a 5–0 rout of UE Cornellà in the domestic cup where he featured the full 90 minutes. Later that month, he was the unused third-choice goalkeeper as the Blancos won the FIFA Club World Cup in Morocco.

=== Alavés ===
On 7 August 2015, Pacheco signed a three-year deal with Deportivo Alavés of division two, with Real Madrid having a buy-back clause. He made his debut for the club on 22 August, starting in a 3–2 away win against SD Huesca.

Pacheco was an undisputed starter for the Basques in his first season. He appeared in 40 league matches – missing one due to injury and being a substitute for Pau Torres in the last matchday – as they achieved promotion back to La Liga after ten years, as champions.

Pacheco's maiden appearance in the Spanish top flight occurred on 21 August 2016, in a 1–1 away draw with Atlético Madrid. He only missed two games in 38 during the campaign, and his team finished comfortably in mid-table; in February he extended his contract to 2020.

Pacheco was ever-present in 2017–18, receiving the highest total marks for the season from the local newspaper El Correo. In December of the next season, his link was lengthened to 2023.

On 13 June 2020, Pacheco was sent off for handling the ball outside the penalty area in the 19th minute of a 2–0 loss at bottom-placed RCD Espanyol. He played every fixture again the following campaign, a narrow escape from relegation.

During his spell at the Mendizorrotza Stadium, Pacheco totalled 253 appearances.

=== Almería ===
On 10 August 2022, Pacheco signed a four-year contract with UD Almería in the top tier. Thinking he would start due to his experience in the competition, he was however unable to beat competition from Fernando Martínez, and asked to leave in the following transfer window.

=== Espanyol ===
On 31 January 2023, Pacheco joined Espanyol on a three-and-a-half-year deal. On 30 June 2025, having lost his starting spot to Joan García in the 2024–25 season, he left.

=== Later career ===
Pacheco moved abroad for the first time in September 2025, with the 33-year-old agreeing to a one-year contract at Saudi Pro League club Al Fateh SC.

== Career statistics ==
As of match played 14 May 2026

Appearances and goals by club, season and competition
Club	Season	League			National Cup		Continental		Other		Total	
Club	Season	Division	Apps	Goals	Apps	Goals	Apps	Goals	Apps	Goals	Apps	Goals
Real Madrid C	2011–12	Tercera División	36	0	—		—		2 (Note: Appearances in Tercera División promotion playoffs)	0	38	0
Real Madrid C	2012–13	Segunda División B	9	0	—		—		—		9	0
Real Madrid C	Total		45	0	—		—		2	0	47	0
Real Madrid B	2012–13	Segunda División	2	0	—		—		—		2	0
Real Madrid B	2013–14	Segunda División	39	0	—		—		—		39	0
Real Madrid B	Total		41	0	—		—		—		41	0
Real Madrid	2011–12	La Liga	0	0	1	0	0	0	0	0	1	0
Real Madrid	2014–15	La Liga	0	0	1	0	0	0	0	0	1	0
Real Madrid	Total		0	0	2	0	0	0	0	0	2	0
Alavés	2015–16	Segunda División	40	0	2	0	—		—		42	0
Alavés	2016–17	La Liga	36	0	3	0	—		—		39	0
Alavés	2017–18	La Liga	38	0	0	0	—		—		38	0
Alavés	2018–19	La Liga	35	0	0	0	—		—		35	0
Alavés	2019–20	La Liga	27	0	0	0	—		—		27	0
Alavés	2020–21	La Liga	38	0	0	0	—		—		38	0
Alavés	2021–22	La Liga	34	0	0	0	—		—		34	0
Alavés	Total		248	0	5	0	—		—		253	0
Almería	2022–23	La Liga	1	0	0	0	—		—		1	0
Espanyol	2022–23	La Liga	16	0	0	0	—		—		16	0
Espanyol	2023–24	Segunda División	28	0	0	0	—		0	0	28	0
Espanyol	2024–25	La Liga	0	0	2	0	—		—		2	0
Espanyol	Total		44	0	2	0	—		0	0	46	0
Al Fateh	2025–26	Saudi Pro League	31	0	3	0	—		—		34	0
Career total			420	0	12	0	0	0	2	0	434	0

== Honours ==
Real Madrid

- FIFA Club World Cup: 2014

Alavés

- Segunda División: 2015–16
