= 2015–16 Deportivo Alavés season =

Deportivo Alavés
2015–16 season
- President: Alfonso Fernández
- Head coach: José Bordalás
- Stadium: Mendizorrotza Stadium
- Segunda División: 1st (promoted)
- Copa del Rey: Third round
Home colours	Away colours	Third colours

The 2015–16 season was the 95th season in Deportivo Alavés's history and the 37th in the Spanish second tier.

== Players ==
=== First-team squad ===
As of 22 January 2016

Note: Flags indicate national team as defined under FIFA eligibility rules; some limited exceptions apply. Players may hold more than one non-FIFA nationality.

No.	Pos.	Nation	Player
1	GK	ESP	Fernando Pacheco
2	DF	ESP	Javier Carpio
3	DF	ESP	Raúl García
4	DF	ESP	Dani Estrada
5	DF	ESP	Víctor Laguardia
7	MF	ESP	Juli
8	MF	ESP	Dani Pacheco (on loan from Betis)
9	FW	ESP	David Torres
10	FW	ESP	Manu Barreiro
11	MF	URU	Facundo Guichón
13	GK	ESP	Pau Torres
14	MF	ESP	Sergio Mora

No.	Pos.	Nation	Player
15	DF	ESP	Sergio Pelegrín
16	DF	ESP	Iñaki Sáenz
17	DF	ESP	Aritz Borda
18	FW	ESP	Gaizka Toquero
19	MF	ESP	Manu García (Captain)
20	MF	ESP	Dani Abalo
21	MF	ESP	Kiko Femenía
22	MF	ARG	Hernán Bernardello
24	MF	ESP	Jagoba Beobide
27	DF	ESP	Einar Galilea
28	MF	ESP	Sergio Llamas
31	FW	ESP	Asier Benito

=== Out on loan ===
Note: Flags indicate national team as defined under FIFA eligibility rules; some limited exceptions apply. Players may hold more than one non-FIFA nationality.

No.	Pos.	Nation	Player
—	FW	ESP	Mathias Soriano (on loan at Tbilissi)

== Competitions ==
=== Overall ===
Competition	Final position
Segunda División	1st
Copa del Rey	3rd round

=== Liga ===
==== League table ====
Pos	Team	Pld	W	D	L	GF	GA	GD	Pts	Promotion, qualification or relegation
1	Alavés (C, P)	42	21	12	9	49	35	+14	75	Promotion to La Liga
2	Leganés (P)	42	20	14	8	59	34	+25	74	Promotion to La Liga
3	Gimnàstic	42	18	17	7	57	41	+16	71	Qualification to promotion play-offs
4	Girona	42	17	15	10	46	28	+18	66	Qualification to promotion play-offs
5	Córdoba	42	19	8	15	59	52	+7	65	Qualification to promotion play-offs

Source: LFP
Rules for classification: 1) points; 2) head-to-head points; 3) head-to-head goal difference; 4) goal difference; 5) number of goals scored
(C) Champions; (P) Promoted

==== Matches ====
Kickoff times are in CET. Win Draw Loss

Match	Opponent	Result
1	HUE	2–3
2	OVI	2–0
3	LLA	3–0
4	MIR	2–3
5	ALM	0–2
6	LEG	0–0
7	ZAR	1–0
8	OSA	3–0
9	LUG	1–0
10	COR	3–2
11	ALB	1–1
12	TEN	2–0
13	GIR	1–0
14	ELC	0–1
15	MLL	1–0
16	VLD	1–2
17	ALC	1–1
18	PON	0–1
19	BIL	3–0
20	NUM	0–1
21	GIM	1–3

Match	Opponent	Result
22	HUE	1–0
23	OVI	1–1
24	LLA	1–0
25	MIR	0–0
26	ALM	1–1
27	LEG	2–0
28	ZAR	0–0
29	OSA	3–1
30	LUG	0–0
31	COR	1–2
32	ALB	0–1
33	TEN	2–2
34	GIR	1–0
35	ELC	0–0
36	MLL	0–0
37	VLD	2–1
38	ALC	0–1
39	PON	2–0
40	BIL	2–3
41	NUM	2–0
42	GIM	1–1

=== Copa del Rey ===
==== 2nd round ====
Match	Opponent	Result
1	CD Numancia	0–1

==== 3rd round ====
Match	Opponent	Result
1	CD Leganés	3–1
