= Martín Aguirregabiria =

Spanish footballer (born 1996)

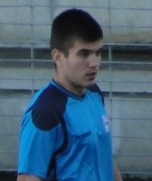

Personal information
- Full name: Martín Aguirregabiria Padilla
- Date of birth: 10 May 1996 (age 30)
- Place of birth: Vitoria-Gasteiz, Spain
- Height: 1.78 m (5 ft 10 in)
- Position: Right-back

Team information
- Current team: Mirandés

Youth career
- 2008–2014: Alavés

Senior career*
Years	Team	Apps	(Gls)
2014–2017	Alavés B	105	(2)
2017–2022	Alavés	129	(1)
2022–2024	Famalicão	41	(0)
2024–2025	Cartagena	29	(1)
2025–2026	Zaragoza	25	(1)
2026–	Mirandés	0	(0)

International career^{‡}
2018–	Basque Country	2	(0)
2018–2019	Spain U21	6	(0)
- * Club domestic league appearances and goals as of 31 May 2026 ‡ National team caps and goals as of 24 March 2024

Martín Aguirregabiria Padilla (born 10 May 1996) is a Spanish professional footballer who plays as a right-back for CD Mirandés.

== Club career ==
=== Alavés ===
Born in Vitoria-Gasteiz, Álava, Aguirregabiria joined Deportivo Alavés's youth setup in 2008, aged 12. He made his senior debut with the reserves in the 2014–15 campaign, in Tercera División.

Aguirregabiria scored his first senior goal on 2 November 2014, in a 3–1 home win against CD Aurrerá de Vitoria. On 29 November 2017 he made his first team debut, starting in a 3–0 home win against Getafe CF for the season's Copa del Rey.

After Carlos Vigaray's knee injury, Aguirregabiria made his La Liga debut on 4 December 2017, starting in a 3–2 away win against Girona FC. Ten days later, he extended his contract until 2021.

On 8 June 2018, Aguirregabiria renewed his contract until 2022, being definitely promoted to the main squad. He scored his first professional goal on 31 October, netting his team's second in a 2–2 home draw against Girona FC, for the season's Copa del Rey.

=== Famalicão ===
On 18 July 2022, free agent Aguirregabiria moved abroad for the first time in his career, signing a three-year deal with Primeira Liga side F.C. Famalicão.

=== Return to Spain ===
On 6 July 2024, Aguirregabiria returned to Spain and its second division, after signing a one-year deal with FC Cartagena. He was regularly used during the season, contributing with one goal in 29 appearances as the club suffered relegation.

On 1 September 2025, Real Zaragoza announced the signing of Aguirregabiria on a one-year contract. After another relegation, he moved to fellow Primera Federación side CD Mirandés on three-year contract on 21 July 2026.

== Career statistics ==
=== Club ===
As of match played 27 February 2021

Appearances and goals by club, season and competition
Club	Season	League			National Cup		Other		Total	
Club	Season	Division	Apps	Goals	Apps	Goals	Apps	Goals	Apps	Goals
Alavés	2016–17	La Liga	0	0	0	0	—		0	0
Alavés	2017–18	La Liga	21	0	4	0	—		25	0
Alavés	2018–19	La Liga	27	0	1	1	—		28	1
Alavés	2019–20	La Liga	31	1	1	0	—		32	1
Alavés	2020–21	La Liga	16	0	3	0	—		19	0
Alavés	Total		95	1	9	1	0	0	104	2
Career total			95	1	9	1	0	0	104	2

== Honours ==
=== International ===
Spain U21

- UEFA European Under-21 Championship: 2019
