= Tomás Pina =

Spanish footballer

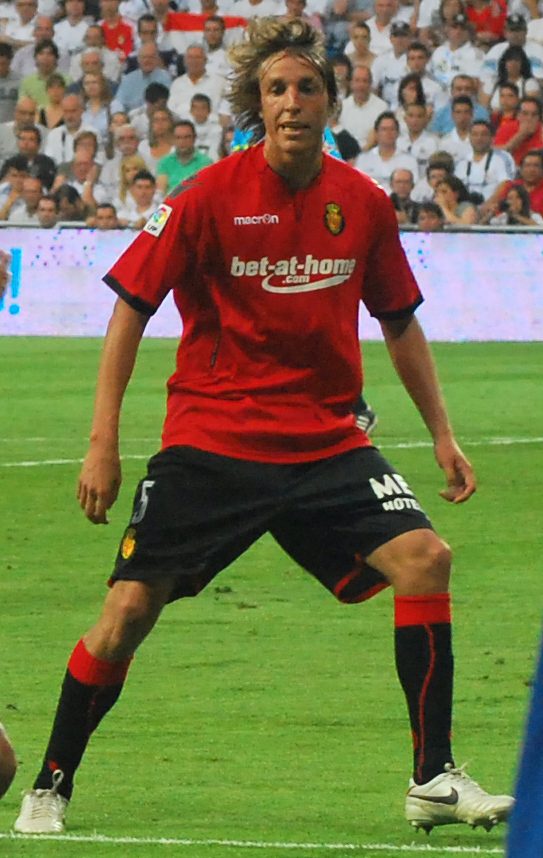
- Pina with Mallorca in 2012

Personal information
- Full name: Tomás Pina Isla
- Date of birth: 14 October 1987 (age 39)
- Place of birth: Villarta de San Juan, Spain
- Height: 1.84 m (6 ft 0 in)
- Position: Midfielder

Youth career
- Parla Escuela
- Móstoles

Senior career*
Years	Team	Apps	(Gls)
2007–2008	Móstoles	35	(0)
2008–2011	Mallorca B	52	(5)
2010–2013	Mallorca	78	(1)
2013–2016	Villarreal	84	(2)
2016–2018	Club Brugge	6	(1)
2017–2018	→ Alavés (loan)	30	(1)
2018–2022	Alavés	110	(4)
2022–2023	Henan	32	(3)
2023–2024	Murcia	27	(1)
Total		454	(18)
- * Club domestic league appearances and goals

Tomás Pina Isla (born 14 October 1987) is a Spanish former professional footballer who played as a central midfielder.

He amassed La Liga totals of 301 matches and eight goals over 12 seasons, with Mallorca, Villarreal and Alavés. He also played in Belgium and China.

== Club career ==
=== Mallorca ===
Pina was born in Villarta de San Juan, Ciudad Real, Castilla–La Mancha. After finishing his football development with amateurs CD Móstoles, he moved to RCD Mallorca in the summer of 2008.

Pina made his professional – and La Liga – debut with the latter on 31 January 2010, playing the last ten minutes in a 2–1 away loss against Xerez CD after coming on as a substitute for Bruno China. He spent the vast majority of his first professional season with the reserve team, in the Segunda División B.

=== Villarreal ===
On 5 July 2013, after Mallorca's top-flight relegation, Pina signed a five-year deal with Villarreal CF, in turn promoted. He scored his first goal for his new team on 4 October, starting and closing a 3–0 home win over Granada CF.

Pina was heavily played during his three-year spell at the Estadio El Madrigal by manager Marcelino García Toral, whether as a starter or a replacement. In the 2015–16 campaign he appeared in 36 games in all competitions, his only goal helping oust SSC Napoli from the UEFA Europa League as his 59th-minute long-range lob from the left flank earned a 1–1 away draw and a 2–1 aggregate victory in the round of 32.

=== Brugge and Alavés ===
On 4 July 2016, the 28-year-old Pina moved abroad for the first time in his career, joining Club Brugge KV from Belgium until 2020. On 7 August of the following year, he returned to Spain and its top tier after agreeing to a one-year loan deal with Deportivo Alavés with a buyout clause.

On 12 August 2018, Pina signed a permanent three-year contract with the Glorioso.

=== Later career ===
Pina joined Henan F.C. of the Chinese Super League on 28 July 2022. The 35-year-old returned to Spain in August 2023, on a deal at Primera Federación club Real Murcia CF.

In June 2024, Pina announced his retirement.

== Career statistics ==
Appearances and goals by club, season and competition
Club	Season	League			Cup		Continental		Total	
Club	Season	Division	Apps	Goals	Apps	Goals	Apps	Goals	Apps	Goals
Mallorca B	2010–11	Segunda División B	17	2	—		—		17	2
Mallorca	2009–10	La Liga	1	0	0	0	—		1	0
Mallorca	2010–11	La Liga	9	0	2	0	—		11	0
Mallorca	2011–12	La Liga	32	1	1	0	—		33	1
Mallorca	2012–13	La Liga	36	0	1	0	—		37	0
Mallorca	Total		78	1	4	0	0	0	82	1
Villarreal	2013–14	La Liga	35	2	4	0	0	0	39	2
Villarreal	2014–15	La Liga	22	0	8	0	9 (Note: Appearances in UEFA Europa League)	1	39	1
Villarreal	2015–16	La Liga	27	0	2	0	7	1	36	1
Villarreal	Total		84	2	14	0	16	2	114	4
Club Brugge	2016–17	Belgian Pro League	6	1	0	0	5 (Note: Appearances in UEFA Champions League)	0	11	1
Alavés (loan)	2017–18	La Liga	30	1	3	0	—		33	1
Alavés	2018–19	La Liga	28	2	0	0	—		28	2
Alavés	2019–20	La Liga	20	1	0	0	—		20	1
Alavés	2020–21	La Liga	33	1	2	0	—		35	1
Alavés	2021–22	La Liga	29	0	0	0	—		29	0
Alavés	Total		140	5	5	0	0	0	145	5
Henan	2022	Chinese Super League	17	2	0	0	—		17	2
Henan	2023	Chinese Super League	15	1	0	0	—		15	1
Henan	Total		32	3	0	0	—		32	3
Murcia	2023–24	Primera Federación	27	1	1	0	—		28	1
Career total			384	14	24	0	21	2	429	16
