= Víctor Laguardia =

Spanish footballer (born 1989)

Personal information
- Full name: Víctor Laguardia Cisneros
- Date of birth: 5 November 1989 (age 37)
- Place of birth: Zaragoza, Spain
- Height: 1.85 m (6 ft 1 in)
- Position: Centre-back

Youth career
- Oliver
- Stadium Casablanca
- Zaragoza

Senior career*
Years	Team	Apps	(Gls)
2008–2011	Zaragoza B	36	(0)
2009–2014	Zaragoza	31	(0)
2011–2012	→ Las Palmas (loan)	25	(1)
2012–2013	→ Alcorcón (loan)	26	(3)
2014–2022	Alavés	250	(11)
2022–2023	Alavés	14	(0)
Total		382	(15)

International career
2009	Spain U20	9	(1)
2009	Spain U21	2	(0)
- * Club domestic league appearances and goals

Víctor Laguardia Cisneros (born 5 November 1989) is a Spanish former professional footballer who played as a central defender.

== Club career ==
=== Zaragoza ===
Laguardia was born in Zaragoza, Aragon. After emerging through hometown Real Zaragoza's youth system he made his first-team – and La Liga – debut on 29 August 2009 in a 1–0 home win against CD Tenerife, but spent the vast majority of his first three seasons as a senior, however, registered with the B side in the Tercera División.

In the summer of 2011, Laguardia was loaned to UD Las Palmas of Segunda División, in a season-long move. More of the same befell in the following campaign, with AD Alcorcón.

=== Alavés ===
Laguardia continued competing in division two the following years, with Zaragoza and Deportivo Alavés. He achieved promotion to the top flight with the latter in 2016, appearing in 39 matches and scoring once.

Laguardia scored his first goal in the Spanish top tier on 1 October 2016, but in a 2–1 away loss to Sevilla FC. During that season he appeared in 31 competitive games for a side that finish ninth and also reached the final of the Copa del Rey for the first time ever, but also suffered a severe knee injury that sidelined him for eight months.

Laguardia left Alavés after his contract expired in July 2022, but returned on 4 October after agreeing to a two-year deal. On 16 July 2023, having been a backup option as the club returned to the top tier, he announced his retirement at the age of 33.

== Career statistics ==
As of match played 27 February 2021

Appearances and goals by club, season and competition
Club	Season	League			National Cup		Other		Total	
Club	Season	Division	Apps	Goals	Apps	Goals	Apps	Goals	Apps	Goals
Zaragoza	2008–09	Segunda División	0	0	0	0	—		0	0
Zaragoza	2009–10	La Liga	3	0	2	0	—		5	0
Zaragoza	2010–11	La Liga	0	0	0	0	—		0	0
Zaragoza	2013–14	Segunda División	28	0	1	0	—		29	0
Zaragoza	Total		31	0	3	0	0	0	34	0
Las Palmas (loan)	2011–12	Segunda División	25	1	1	0	—		26	1
Alcorcón (loan)	2012–13	Segunda División	26	3	2	0	0	0	28	3
Alavés	2014–15	Segunda División	35	1	3	0	—		38	1
Alavés	2015–16	Segunda División	39	1	2	1	—		41	2
Alavés	2016–17	La Liga	26	2	5	0	—		31	2
Alavés	2017–18	La Liga	17	2	2	0	—		19	2
Alavés	2018–19	La Liga	36	1	0	0	—		36	1
Alavés	2019–20	La Liga	31	1	1	0	—		32	1
Alavés	2020–21	La Liga	21	0	2	0	—		23	0
Alavés	Total		205	8	15	1	0	0	220	9
Career total			287	12	21	1	0	0	308	13

== Honours ==
Alavés

- Segunda División: 2015–16

Spain U20

- Mediterranean Games: 2009
