= Guillermo Maripán =

Chilean footballer (born 1994)

Personal information
- Full name: Guillermo Alfonso Maripán Loayza
- Date of birth: 6 May 1994 (age 32)
- Place of birth: Vitacura, Chile
- Height: 1.93 m (6 ft 4 in)
- Position: Centre-back

Team information
- Current team: Internacional

Youth career
- 2002–2014: Universidad Católica

Senior career*
Years	Team	Apps	(Gls)
2012–2017	Universidad Católica	55	(3)
2017–2019	Alavés	43	(2)
2019–2024	Monaco	123	(11)
2024–2026	Torino	55	(3)
2026–	Internacional	0	(0)

International career^{‡}
2017–	Chile	62	(2)
- * Club domestic league appearances and goals as of 25 May 2026 ‡ National team caps and goals as of 9 Jume 2026

Guillermo Alfonso Maripán Loaysa (Spanish pronunciation: [ɡiˈʝeɾmo maɾiˈpan]; born 6 May 1994) is a Chilean footballer who plays as centre-back for Brazilian club Internacional and the Chile national team.

== Early life ==
Maripán was born on 6 May 1994 in the commune of Vitacura, Chile.

== Club career ==
=== Alavés ===
On 7 July 2017, Maripán moved abroad for the first time in his career after agreeing to a four-year deal with La Liga side Deportivo Alavés.

=== Monaco ===
On 24 August 2019, Maripán joined Ligue 1 club Monaco on a five-year deal. His second season in the Monegasque team consolidated him as one of the best defenders in Ligue 1: he was designated by the CIES Football Observatory as the best Chilean of the season, and he was also the central defender who scored the most goals. Guillermo Maripán signed his best scoring season in the 2020–21 academic year, and also improved five key aspects in his game that evidenced his sporting growth.

=== Torino ===
On 29 August 2024, Maripán signed for Serie A club Torino on a two-year deal.

=== Internacional ===
Ended his contract with Torino, Maripán returned to South America and signed with Brazilian club Internacional on 1 July 2026.

== International career ==
In 2017, Maripán debuted for the Chilean senior squad in a friendly match against Burkina Faso. On 31 May 2018, he scored his first goal for another friendly match against Romania in Austria. At the 2021 Copa América, he starred in one of the tournament's matches after making a feint to Lionel Messi.

== Career statistics ==
=== Club ===
As of match played 22 February 2026

Appearances and goals by club, season and competition
Club	Season	League			National cup		League cup		Continental		Other		Total	
Club	Season	Division	Apps	Goals	Apps	Goals	Apps	Goals	Apps	Goals	Apps	Goals	Apps	Goals
Universidad Católica	2012	Chilean Primera División	1	0	—		—		—		—		1	0
Universidad Católica	2013	Chilean Primera División	0	0	0	0	—		—		—		0	0
Universidad Católica	2014–15	Chilean Primera División	5	0	0	0	—		—		—		5	0
Universidad Católica	2015–16	Chilean Primera División	23	2	0	0	—		4 (Note: Appearance(s) in Copa Sudamericana)	0	4 (Note: Appearances in Pre-Libertadores tournament)	0	31	2
Universidad Católica	2016–17	Chilean Primera División	26	1	3	0	—		1	0	1 (Note: Appearance in Supercopa de Chile)	0	31	1
Universidad Católica	2017	Chilean Primera División	—		—		—		5 (Note: Appearances in Copa Libertadores)	0	—		5	0
Universidad Católica	Total		55	3	3	0	—		10	0	5	0	73	3
Alavés	2017–18	La Liga	19	0	3	0	—		—		—		22	0
Alavés	2018–19	La Liga	23	2	2	0	—		—		—		25	2
Alavés	2019–20	La Liga	1	0	0	0	—		—		—		1	0
Alavés	Total		43	2	5	0	—		—		—		48	2
Monaco	2019–20	Ligue 1	20	2	2	0	2	0	—		—		24	2
Monaco	2020–21	Ligue 1	28	5	3	0	—		—		—		31	5
Monaco	2021–22	Ligue 1	26	0	3	1	—		8 (Note: Six appearances in UEFA Europa League, one appearance in UEFA Champions League)	0	—		37	1
Monaco	2022–23	Ligue 1	26	3	0	0	—		7 (Note: Two appearances and one goal in UEFA Champions League, five appearances in UEFA Europa League)	1	—		33	4
Monaco	2023–24	Ligue 1	23	1	2	0	—		—		—		25	1
Monaco	Total		123	11	10	1	2	0	15	1	—		150	13
Torino	2024–25	Serie A	28	1	1	0	—		—		—		29	1
Torino	2025–26	Serie A	24	2	2	0	—		—		—		26	2
Torino	Total		52	3	3	0	—		—		—		55	3
Career total			273	19	21	1	2	0	25	1	5	0	329	21

=== International ===
As of match played 9 June 2026

Appearances and goals by national team and year
National team	Year	Apps	Goals
Chile	2017	3	0
Chile	2018	10	2
Chile	2019	11	0
Chile	2020	2	0
Chile	2021	11	0
Chile	2022	3	0
Chile	2023	7	0
Chile	2024	5	0
Chile	2025	7	0
Chile	2026	3	0
Total		62	2

As of match played 9 June 2026. Scores and results list Chile's goal tally first.

List of international goals scored by Guillermo Maripán
No.	Date	Venue	Opponent	Score	Result	Competition
1.	31 May 2018	Sportzentrum Graz-Weinzödl, Graz, Austria	Romania	1–1	2–3	Friendly
2.	4 June 2018	Sportzentrum Graz-Weinzödl, Graz, Austria	Serbia	1–0	1–0	Friendly

== Honours ==
Universidad Católica

- Primera División de Chile: 2016–C, 2016–A
- Copa Chile runner-up: 2012
- Supercopa de Chile: 2016

Monaco

- Coupe de France runner-up: 2020–21
