= Mubarak Wakaso =

Ghanaian footballer (born 1990)

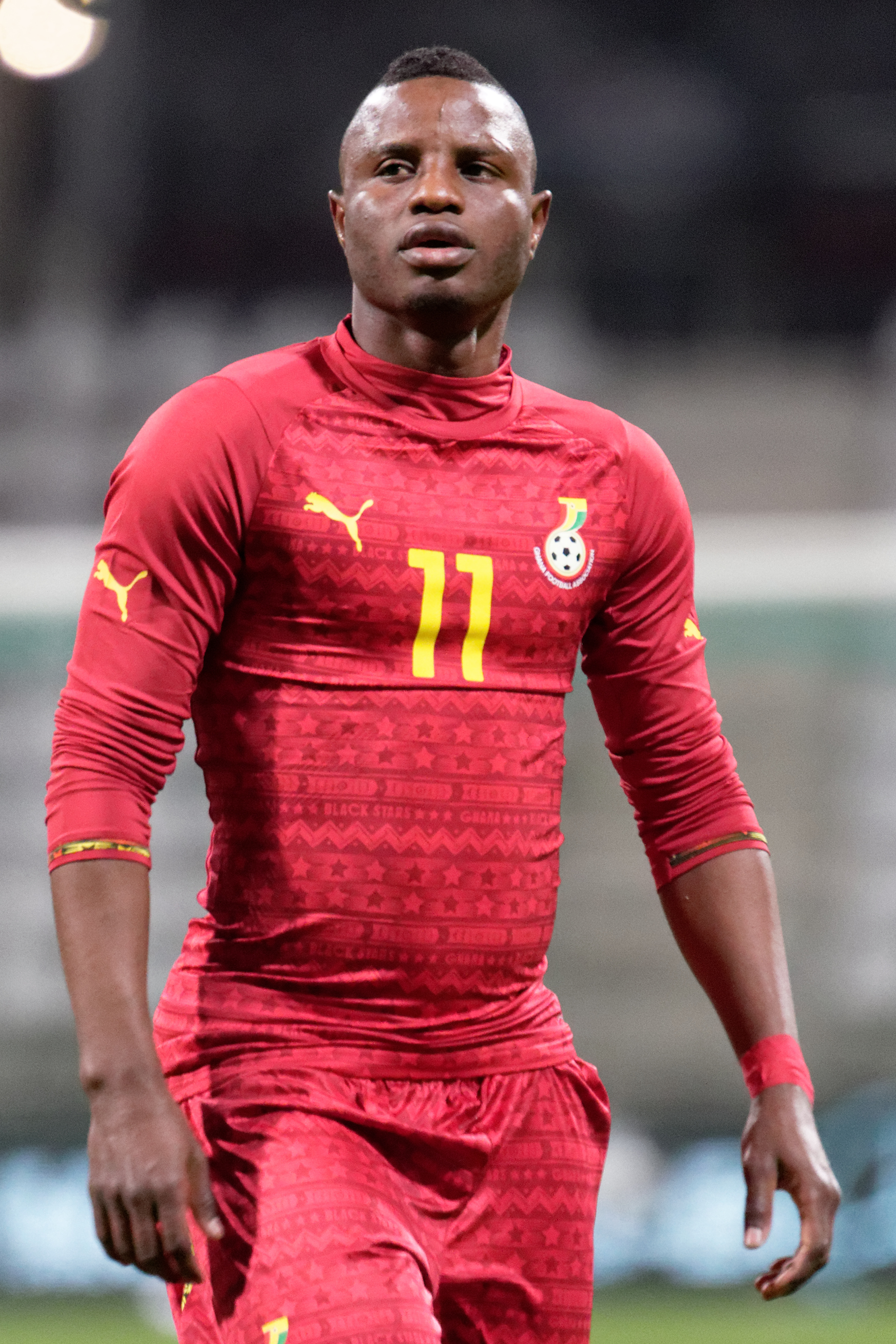
- Wakaso with Ghana in 2015

Personal information
- Date of birth: 25 July 1990 (age 36)
- Place of birth: Tamale, Ghana
- Height: 1.71 m (5 ft 7 in)
- Position: Midfielder

Youth career
- Adelaide

Senior career*
Years	Team	Apps	(Gls)
2007–2008	Ashanti Gold		
2008–2011	Elche	58	(1)
2011	Villarreal B	5	(1)
2011–2012	Villarreal	17	(0)
2012–2013	Espanyol	26	(3)
2013–2016	Rubin Kazan	16	(2)
2014–2015	→ Celtic (loan)	5	(0)
2015–2016	→ Las Palmas (loan)	20	(1)
2016–2017	Panathinaikos	8	(1)
2017	→ Granada (loan)	11	(1)
2017–2020	Alavés	66	(1)
2020	Jiangsu Suning	18	(0)
2021–2023	Shenzhen	18	(0)
2022–2023	→ Eupen (loan)	9	(0)
Total		277	(11)

International career
2005	Ghana U17		
2012–2022	Ghana	70	(13)
Medal record
Men's football
Representing Ghana
Africa Cup of Nations
Runner-up	2015 Equatorial Guinea
- * Club domestic league appearances and goals

Mubarak Wakaso (born 25 July 1990) is a Ghanaian former professional footballer who played as a midfielder.

He spent the better part of his career in Spain, starting out at Elche in 2008 and going on to represent Villarreal, Espanyol, Las Palmas, Granada and Alavés. He also played in Russia, Scotland, Greece, China and Belgium.

Wakaso appeared with the Ghana national team at the 2014 World Cup as well as five Africa Cup of Nations tournaments.

== Club career ==
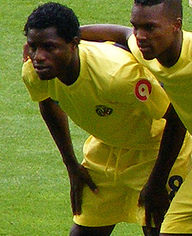
Wakaso before a game with Villarreal in 2011

=== Early career and Spain ===
Born in Tamale, Northern Region, Wakaso began his senior career at Ashanti Gold SC. In 2008, he moved abroad and signed a four-year contract with Elche CF from Spain, but only joined the club two months later, however, due to international duty.

In late January 2011, after several bouts of indiscipline and internal codes violations, Wakaso was released by the Valencians. Shortly after, he joined another side in the region and Segunda División, Villarreal CF's reserves.

On 27 February 2011, Wakaso made his La Liga debut, coming on as a substitute for José Catalá in the last minutes of a 2–2 away draw against Racing de Santander. He only played six matches in his first full season, and the Yellow Submarine was also relegated after 12 years in the top flight.

Wakaso agreed to a four-year deal with RCD Espanyol on 11 July 2012. He started in 23 of his league appearances for the Catalans in his only campaign.

=== Rubin Kazan ===
In the last days of the 2013 summer transfer window, Wakaso moved to the Russian Premier League with FC Rubin Kazan. On 28 August 2014, he joined Celtic on a season-long loan.

Wakaso scored on his competitive debut for Celtic, opening a 2–2 away draw against FC Red Bull Salzburg in the group stage of the UEFA Europa League. On 30 August 2015, he was loaned to UD Las Palmas for one year.

=== Panathinaikos ===
On 10 July 2016, Wakaso joined Super League Greece's Panathinaikos F.C. on a three-year contract for an undisclosed fee. On 15 September, in the last minute of a Europa League group phase home fixture against AFC Ajax, he was sent off – as teammate Ivan Ivanov midway through the second half – in an eventual 1–2 home loss; after his initial ban was over, UEFA suspended him a further two games.

On 1 February 2017, Wakaso was loaned to another Spanish top-flight team, Granada CF. He scored his first goal for them on 1 March, helping to a 2–1 home win over Deportivo Alavés.

=== Alavés ===
On 17 July 2017, the day after mutually terminating his contract, Wakaso signed a three-year deal with Alavés. He scored his only competitive goal for the Basques on 18 May 2019, in a 2–1 home defeat of Girona FC who were relegated as a result.

=== China ===
Wakaso transferred to Chinese Super League club Jiangsu Suning F.C. on 18 January 2020. On 12 April of the following year, he joined Shenzhen F.C. in the same country after the former were dissolved.

== International career ==
Wakaso represented Ghana at the 2005 FIFA U-17 World Championship in Peru, playing two matches in a group-stage exit (three draws). He made his full international debut on 13 October 2012, in a 2013 Africa Cup of Nations qualifier against Malawi.

On 14 November 2012, Wakaso scored his first goal in a friendly with Cape Verde. He was picked for the squad that appeared at the 2013 CAN in South Africa, notably netting the game's only goal in a group stage fixture against Mali, through a penalty kick, then scoring both in the 2–0 quarter-final win over Cape Verde.

Wakaso was selected by manager James Kwesi Appiah for his 2014 FIFA World Cup squad. He made his debut in the tournament on 21 June, playing 22 minutes of a 2–2 draw against Germany.

On 5 February 2015, Wakaso scored the second goal in Ghana's 3–0 defeat of Equatorial Guinea in the semi-finals of the 2015 Africa Cup of Nations. In the decisive match, against the Ivory Coast, he converted his penalty shootout attempt in an eventual 9–8 loss.

== Personal life ==
Wakaso's younger brother, Alhassan, was also a footballer and a midfielder. He spent most of his career in Portugal.

Wakaso is a practising Muslim. In October 2018, while heading to Bilbao Airport to travel to Ghana, he was unhurt following a car accident.

== Career statistics ==
=== Club ===
Appearances and goals by club, season and competition
Club	Season	League			National cup (Note: Includes Copa del Rey, Greek Football Cup, Chinese FA Cup, Belgian Cup)		League cup (Note: Includes Scottish League Cup)		Continental		Total	
Club	Season	Division	Apps	Goals	Apps	Goals	Apps	Goals	Apps	Goals	Apps	Goals
Elche	2008–09	Segunda División	16	0	0	0	–		–		16	0
Elche	2009–10	Segunda División	26	0	0	0	–		–		26	0
Elche	2010–11	Segunda División	16	1	2	1	–		–		18	2
Elche	Total		58	1	2	1	–		–		60	2
Villarreal B	2010–11	Segunda División	5	1	–		–		–		5	1
Villarreal	2010–11	La Liga	11	0	–		–		4 (Note: Appearances in UEFA Europa League)	0	15	0
Villarreal	2011–12	La Liga	6	0	0	0	–		4 (Note: Appearances in UEFA Champions League)	0	10	0
Villarreal	Total		17	0	0	0	–		8	0	25	0
Espanyol	2012–13	La Liga	26	3	1	0	–		–		27	3
Rubin Kazan	2013–14	Russian Premier League	14	2	0	0	–		4	0	18	2
Rubin Kazan	2014–15	Russian Premier League	2	0	–		–		–		2	0
Rubin Kazan	Total		16	2	0	0	–		4	0	20	2
Celtic (loan)	2014–15	Scottish Premiership	5	0	0	0	1	0	5	1	11	1
Las Palmas (loan)	2015–16	La Liga	20	1	4	1	–		–		24	2
Panathinaikos	2016–17	Super League Greece	8	1	1	0	–		7	0	16	1
Granada (loan)	2016–17	La Liga	11	1	0	0	–		–		11	1
Alavés	2017–18	La Liga	21	0	3	0	–		–		24	0
Alavés	2018–19	La Liga	29	1	0	0	–		–		29	1
Alavés	2019–20	La Liga	16	0	1	0	–		–		7	0
Alavés	Total		66	1	4	0	–		–		70	1
Jiangsu Suning	2020	Chinese Super League	18	0	1	0	–		–		19	0
Shenzhen	2021	Chinese Super League	13	0	0	0	–		–		13	0
Shenzhen	2023	Chinese Super League	5	0	0	0	–		–		5	0
Shenzhen	Total		18	0	0	0	–		–		18	0
Eupen (loan)	2022–23	Belgian Pro League	9	0	1	0	–		–		10	0
Career total			277	11	14	2	1	0	24	1	316	14

=== International ===
Ghana
Year	Apps	Goals
2012	2	1
2013	13	6
2014	10	1
2015	14	3
2016	6	1
2017	6	0
2018	1	0
2019	8	0
2020	1	0
2021	6	1
2022	3	0
Total	70	13

Ghana score listed first, score column indicates score after each Wakaso goal.

List of international goals scored by Mubarak Wakaso
No.	Date	Venue	Opponent	Score	Result	Competition
1	14 November 2012	Estádio Universitário, Lisbon, Portugal	Cape Verde	1–0	1–0	Friendly
2	13 January 2013	Sheikh Zayed, Abu Dhabi, United Arab Emirates	Tunisia	2–2	4–2	Friendly
3	24 January 2013	Nelson Mandela Bay, Port Elizabeth, South Africa	Mali	1–0	1–0	2013 Africa Cup of Nations
4	2 February 2013	Nelson Mandela Bay, Port Elizabeth, South Africa	Cape Verde	1–0	2–0	2013 Africa Cup of Nations
5	2 February 2013	Nelson Mandela Bay, Port Elizabeth, South Africa	Cape Verde	2–0	2–0	2013 Africa Cup of Nations
6	6 February 2013	Mbombela, Nelspruit, South Africa	Burkina Faso	1–0	1–1	2013 Africa Cup of Nations
7	24 March 2013	Baba Yara, Kumasi, Ghana	Sudan	2–0	4–0	2014 FIFA World Cup qualification
8	19 November 2014	Tamale Stadium, Tamale, Ghana	Togo	2–0	3–1	2015 Africa Cup of Nations qualification
9	5 February 2015	Estadio de Malabo, Malabo, Equatorial Guinea	Equatorial Guinea	2–0	3–0	2015 Africa Cup of Nations
10	5 September 2015	Amahoro, Kigali, Rwanda	Rwanda	1–0	3–0	2017 Africa Cup of Nations qualification
11	17 November 2015	Baba Yara, Kumasi, Ghana	Comoros	1–0	2–0	2018 FIFA World Cup qualification
12	11 October 2016	Moses Mabhida, Durban, South Africa	South Africa	1–0	1–1	Friendly
13	3 September 2021	Cape Coast Sports Stadium, Cape Coast, Ghana	Ethiopia	1–0	1–0	2022 FIFA World Cup qualification

== Honours ==
Celtic

- Scottish Premiership: 2014–15
- Scottish League Cup: 2014–15

Jiangsu Suning

- Chinese Super League: 2020

Ghana

- Africa Cup of Nations runner-up: 2015

Individual

- Africa Cup of Nations top scorer: 2013 (4 goals)
- Africa Cup of Nations Team of the Tournament: 2017
