= Nando García =

Spanish footballer (born 1994)

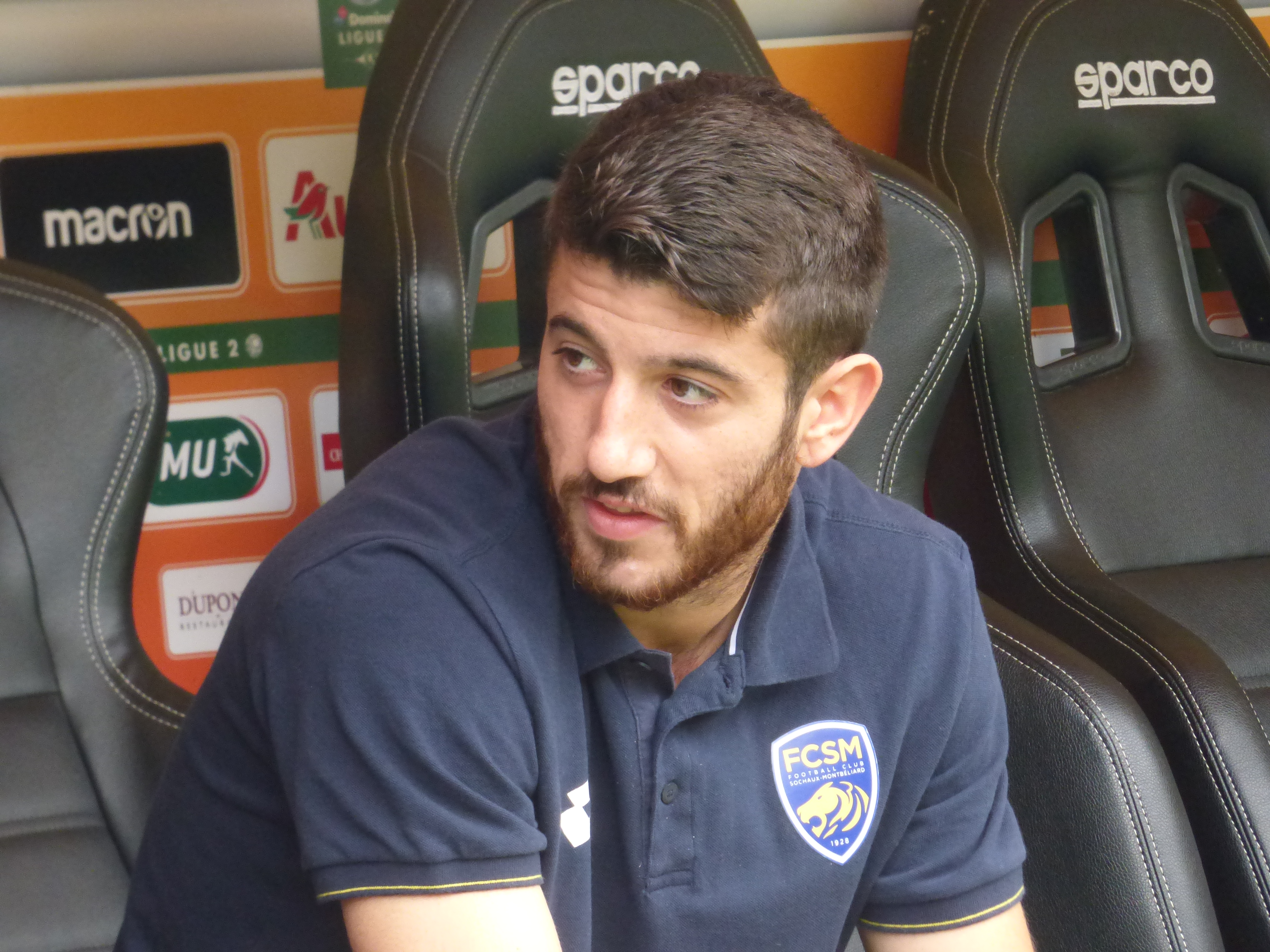
- Nando with Sochaux in 2018

Personal information
- Full name: Fernando García Puchades
- Date of birth: 13 June 1994 (age 32)
- Place of birth: Valencia, Spain
- Height: 1.77 m (5 ft 9 1/2 in)
- Position: Winger

Youth career
- 2007–2013: Valencia

Senior career*
Years	Team	Apps	(Gls)
2013–2017	Valencia B	34	(2)
2013–2014	→ Ribarroja (loan)	33	(3)
2015–2016	→ Córdoba (loan)	37	(1)
2016–2017	→ Oviedo (loan)	32	(2)
2017–2019	Alavés	0	(0)
2017–2018	→ Lorca (loan)	34	(1)
2018	→ Sochaux (loan)	19	(0)
2019	→ Extremadura (loan)	16	(0)
2019–2020	Arka Gdynia	6	(0)
2020	Racing Santander	13	(1)
2020–2021	AEK Larnaca	31	(2)
2021–2022	Albacete	8	(0)
2022–2023	Rayo Majadahonda	54	(3)
2023–2024	CE Sabadell	23	(0)
2024–2025	Águilas	17	(1)
- * Club domestic league appearances and goals as of 4 May 2025

Fernando García Puchades (born 13 June 1994) is a Spanish footballer who plays mainly as a right winger.

== Club career ==
Born in Valencia, Nando joined Valencia CF's youth setup in 2007, aged 13. On 7 August 2013 he was loaned to Ribarroja CF in Tercera División, making his debut as a senior for the side during the campaign.

Nando returned to the Che in the middle of 2014, being assigned to the reserves in Segunda División B. On 8 April 2015 he renewed his contract until 2018, after being linked to FC Barcelona and Real Madrid.

On 16 July 2015 Nando was loaned to Córdoba CF in Segunda División, for one year. He made his professional debut on 22 August, starting in a 1–0 home win against Real Valladolid.

Nando scored his first professional goal on 29 November 2015, netting his team's second in a 2–1 home win against Real Oviedo. On 1 August of the following year he joined the latter, signing a one-year loan deal.

Nando appeared in the 2017 pre-season with Valencia's main squad, but on 26 August of that year, he signed a three-year contract with fellow La Liga side Deportivo Alavés, being immediately loaned to Lorca FC in the second division. On 2 July of the following year, he moved to Ligue 2 side FC Sochaux-Montbéliard also on a one-year loan deal.

On 17 January 2019, Nando returned to his home country and joined Extremadura UD in the second division, on loan until June. On 2 September, he terminated his contract with Alavés. On 31 January 2020 García signed for Racing de Santander until 30 June.

On 4 August 2023, Nando was announced at CE Sabadell.

On 29 August 2024, Nando was announced at Águilas.
