= Adrián Diéguez =

Spanish footballer (born 1996)

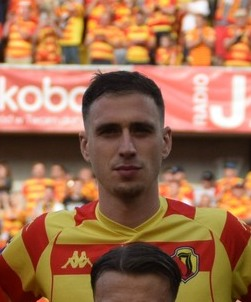
- Diéguez in 2024 with Jagiellonia Białystok

Personal information
- Full name: Adrián Diéguez Grande
- Date of birth: 4 February 1996 (age 30)
- Place of birth: Madrid, Spain
- Height: 1.88 m (6 ft 2 in)
- Position: Defender

Team information
- Current team: Radomiak Radom
- Number: 26

Youth career
- 2010–2012: Getafe
- 2012–2014: Carabanchel
- 2014–2015: Getafe

Senior career*
Years	Team	Apps	(Gls)
2015–2017	Alcorcón B	37	(1)
2016–2017	Alcorcón	5	(0)
2017	→ Fuenlabrada (loan)	16	(0)
2017–2018	Alavés B	2	(1)
2017–2020	Alavés	6	(0)
2019	→ Huesca (loan)	9	(0)
2019–2020	→ Alcorcón (loan)	32	(1)
2020–2022	Fuenlabrada	69	(2)
2022–2023	Ponferradina	30	(0)
2023–2025	Jagiellonia Białystok	46	(0)
2025–	Radomiak Radom	28	(1)
- * Club domestic league appearances and goals as of 22:36, 29 May 2026 (UTC)

Adrián Diéguez Grande (born 4 February 1996) is a Spanish professional footballer who plays as either a central defender or a left-back for Ekstraklasa club Radomiak Radom.

== Career ==
=== Youth career ===
Born in Madrid, Diéguez represented Getafe and Carabanchel as a youth.

=== Alcorcón ===
On 29 July 2015, he moved to neighbouring Alcorcón, being assigned to the reserves in Tercera División. Diéguez made his senior debut on 30 August 2015, starting in a 2–2 away draw against Pozuelo de Alarcón. He scored his first goal as a senior the following 15 May in a 1–2 loss at Parla.

Diéguez played his first professional match on 8 September 2016, starting in a 1–0 Copa del Rey home win against his former club Getafe. His Segunda División debut came eleven days later, in a 1–0 home victory over Córdoba CF.

==== Loan to Fuenlabrada ====
On 25 January 2017, Diéguez was loaned to Segunda División B side Fuenlabrada until June.

=== Deportivo Alavés B ===
On 4 July 2017, he moved to another reserve team, after agreeing to a four-year deal with Deportivo Alavés B, but joined the main squad in La Liga ahead of the pre-season. Diéguez made his debut in the main category of Spanish football on 28 October 2017, starting in a 1–2 home loss against Valencia.

==== Loan to Huesca ====
On 31 January 2019, he moved to fellow top tier side Huesca on loan until the end of the season, and made his debut for the club on 9 February in a 2–0 win against Girona.

==== Return to Alcorcón ====
On 28 July 2019, Diéguez returned to his first club Alcorcón after agreeing to a one-year loan deal.

=== Return to Fuenlabrada ===
On 15 September of the following year, he returned to Fuenla on a four-year contract, with the side now in the second division.

=== Ponferradina ===
On 27 July 2022, after Fuenlabrada's relegation, Diéguez moved to another second division club Ponferradina, for a €350,000 transfer fee.

=== Jagiellonia Białystok ===
On 21 June 2023, Jagiellonia Białystok announced the signing of Diéguez on a two-year deal with an extension option. He was assigned with squad number 17 and debuted on 22 July 2023 in a 3–0 away loss to Raków Częstochowa. That match was also his first appearance in the starting lineup. On 14 April 2024, in the 18th minute of a 1–3 home loss to Cracovia, he received a straight-away red card for fouling Benjamin Källman.

On 7 August 2024, he scored an own goal in a 0–1 home loss against Bodø/Glimt in the UEFA Champions League third qualifying round. Diéguez scored his first goal for Jagiellonia on 22 August 2024 in the 5th minute of a 1–4 home loss to Ajax in the UEFA Europa League fourth qualifying round. On 15 September 2024, he was given a red card in a 5–0 away loss to Lech Poznań. On 12 November 2024, his contract was extended until 2026.

During the training camp, which took place in January 2025 in Belek, Turkey, he sustained a knee collateral ligaments injury.

=== Radomiak Radom ===
On 7 August 2025, after leaving Jagiellonia by mutual consent, Diéguez signed a two-year deal with fellow Ekstraklasa club Radomiak Radom.

== Honours ==
Jagiellonia Białystok

- Ekstraklasa: 2023–24

Individual

- Polish Union of Footballers' Ekstraklasa Team of the Season: 2023–24
