= Carlos Vigaray =

Spanish footballer

Personal information
- Full name: Carlos Martín Vigaray
- Date of birth: 7 September 1994 (age 32)
- Place of birth: Leganés, Spain
- Height: 1.82 m (6 ft 0 in)
- Position: Right-back

Team information
- Current team: Teruel
- Number: 2

Youth career
- Getafe

Senior career*
Years	Team	Apps	(Gls)
2013–2015	Getafe B	46	(0)
2014–2016	Getafe	28	(1)
2016–2019	Alavés	39	(0)
2019–2023	Zaragoza	52	(2)
2023–2024	Fuenlabrada	20	(0)
2024	Al-Ahli		
2025–	Teruel	0	(0)
- * Club domestic league appearances and goals as of 26 December 2025

Carlos Martín Vigaray (born 7 September 1994) is a Spanish professional footballer who plays as a right-back for Primera Federación club Teruel.

== Club career ==
=== Getafe ===
Born in Leganés, Community of Madrid, Vigaray finished his youth career with Getafe CF's youth setup, and made his senior debut with the reserves in the 2012–13 season, in Segunda División B. On 31 May 2013, he signed a new two-year contract with the club.

On 16 January 2014, Vigaray played his first official match with the first team, starting in a 0–2 home loss against FC Barcelona in the round of 16 of the Copa del Rey. Exactly one month later, due to many injuries to the defensive sector, he first appeared in La Liga, featuring the full 90 minutes in a 0–3 defeat to Real Madrid also at the Coliseum Alfonso Pérez.

Vigaray scored his first professional goal on 17 December 2014, the first in a 2–1 away win against SD Eibar in the Spanish Cup (5–1 on aggregate). In June 2015, he signed a new two-year deal with Geta and was definitely promoted to the main squad.

On 24 October 2015, Vigaray committed two penalty kicks that resulted in as many yellow cards, with the subsequent 60th-minute dismissal and goals by Éver Banega and Kevin Gameiro in an eventual 5–0 loss at Sevilla FC. He scored his only league goal the following 1 May, helping his team to a 2–0 away victory over Deportivo de La Coruña.

=== Alavés ===
Vigaray signed a three-year contract with Deportivo Alavés on 12 August 2016, remaining in the top tier. He struggled with injuries and competition from youth graduate Martín Aguirregabiria during his spell at the club, being mainly a backup option.

=== Zaragoza ===
On 11 July 2019, free agent Vigaray joined Segunda División side Real Zaragoza on a four-year deal. He dealt with several physical problems during his tenure at the La Romareda, being released on 26 June 2023.

=== Later career ===
In late August 2023, Vigaray agreed to a one-year contract at CF Fuenlabrada of the Primera Federación. One year later, the 30-year-old signed for Bahraini Premier League club Al-Ahli Club (Manama), managed by his compatriot Ángel López.
