= Christian Santos =

Venezuelan footballer (born 1988)

Personal information
- Full name: Christian Robert Santos Kwasniewski
- Date of birth: 24 March 1988 (age 38)
- Place of birth: Ciudad Guayana, Venezuela
- Height: 1.84 m (6 ft 0 in)
- Position: Forward

Team information
- Current team: Trujillanos
- Number: 7

Youth career
- SV Lippstadt
- 2003–2007: Arminia Bielefeld

Senior career*
Years	Team	Apps	(Gls)
2007–2011	Arminia Bielefeld II	78	(28)
2011–2013	Eupen	58	(25)
2013–2014	Waasland-Beveren	0	(0)
2014–2016	NEC	71	(43)
2016–2018	Alavés	31	(5)
2018–2020	Deportivo La Coruña	48	(9)
2020–2021	VfL Osnabrück	29	(8)
2021–2022	Colo-Colo	13	(1)
2022–2023	Juve Stabia	14	(2)
2023	Unionistas	14	(4)
2023	Universidad Central	8	(0)
2024	Arenteiro	13	(4)
2024–2025	Rayo Majadahonda	13	(0)
2025	Anzoátegui	19	(2)
2026-	Trujillanos	5	(0)

International career^{‡}
2015–	Venezuela	13	(1)
- * Club domestic league appearances and goals as of 14:26, 12 September 2024 (UTC) ‡ National team caps and goals as of 02:44, 14 September 2018 (UTC)

Christian Robert Santos Kwasniewski (born 24 March 1988) is a Venezuelan professional footballer who plays as a forward who plays for Trujillanos.

== Club career ==
=== Early career ===
Born in Ciudad Guayana, Bolívar, Santos moved to Germany at the age of six as his father received a new job in the country. After starting his career at SV Lippstadt he moved to Arminia Bielefeld in 2003, and made his senior debut for the latter's reserve team on 6 May 2007, coming on as a late substitute in a 3–0 Oberliga Westfalen home win against Sportfreunde Lotte.

Santos scored his first senior goal on 1 April 2009, netting his team's second in a 3–1 away win against Delbrücker SC. After failed to make a single appearance with the first team, he left the club in 2011.

=== Belgium ===
On 9 August 2011, Santos signed for KAS Eupen in the Belgian Second Division. He scored a 15 goals during his first season, and added a further ten in his second.

In April 2013, Santos moved to Belgian Pro League club Waasland-Beveren, but failed to appear in a single match due to a severe knee injury.

=== NEC ===
In July 2014, Santos signed a one-year contract with Dutch Eerste Divisie side NEC Nijmegen, after impressing on a trial basis. He made his professional debut on 10 August, starting in a 3–1 home win against FC Eindhoven.

Santos scored his first professional goal on 15 August 2014, netting the last in a 2–0 win at FC Volendam. He finished the campaign with 23 goals in only 34 appearances, as his side achieved promotion to Eredivisie as champions; highlights included braces against FC Den Bosch, MVV Maastricht and FC Oss.

Santos made his debut in the main category of Dutch football on 12 August 2015, starting in a 1–0 home win against SBV Excelsior. He scored his first goals in the division on 18 September, netting all his team's goals in a 2–0 success over SC Heerenveen.

Santos added another doubles against ADO Den Haag (4–1 home win) and De Graafschap (2–0 home win), totalling 16 goals in 30 matches.

=== Alavés ===
On 12 July 2016, free agent Santos signed a three-year deal with Deportivo Alavés, newly promoted to La Liga. He made his debut in the league on 21 August, replacing Gaizka Toquero in a 1–1 away draw against Atlético Madrid.

=== Deportivo La Coruña ===
On 28 June 2018, Santos signed a two-year deal with Deportivo de La Coruña, after cutting ties with Alavés. He scored his first goal in an away match against Gimnàstic de Tarragona on 1 October 2018, one minute after entering as a substitute in 85th minute. On 27 January 2019, he scored a decisive goal in 2–1 away victory against Sporting de Gijón. On 18 August 2019, he scored a decisive goal in 88th minute after coming from the bench three minutes earlier in a 3–2 victory against Real Oviedo.

=== VfL Osnabrück ===
In September 2020, Santos returned to Germany joining 2. Bundesliga club VfL Osnabrück on a two-year contract.

=== Colo-Colo ===
In September 2021, Santos joined Colo-Colo in the Chilean Primera División. In June 2022, he ended his contract after making thirteen appearances and scoring a goal.

=== Juve Stabia ===
On 12 October 2022, Santos signed with Juve Stabia in the Italian third-tier Serie C until the end of the 2022–23 season.

=== Unionistas ===
On 1 February 2023, Santos joined Unionistas in the Spanish third-tier Primera Federación.

=== Rayo Majadahonda ===
On 12 September 2024, Santos joined Rayo Majadahonda on a one-year deal.

== International career ==
After being allowed to play for Venezuela in January 2015, Santos made his full international debut on 27 March of that year, starting and being booked in a 2–1 friendly loss against Jamaica. He scored his first international goal on 13 October, but in a 3–1 2018 FIFA World Cup qualifiers loss against Brazil.

Santos was also included in Rafael Dudamel's 23-man list ahead of the Copa America Centenario. His first and only appearance of the tournament occurred on 13 June 2016, in a 1–1 draw against Mexico.

=== International goals ===
Scores and results list Venezuela's goal tally first, score column indicates score after each Santos goal.

List of international goals scored by Christian Santos
No.	Date	Venue	Opponent	Score	Result	Competition
1	13 October 2015	Castelão, Fortaleza, Brazil	Brazil	1–2	1–3	2018 FIFA World Cup qualifiers

== Honours ==
NEC

- Eerste Divisie: 2014–15
