= Juanan Entrena =

Spanish footballer (born 1996)

Personal information
- Full name: Juan Antonio Entrena Gálvez
- Date of birth: 19 May 1996 (age 30)
- Place of birth: Huétor-Tájar, Spain
- Height: 1.83 m (6 ft 0 in)
- Position: Winger

Team information
- Current team: Huétor Tájar

Youth career
- Granada
- Sevilla
- 2011–2013: Barcelona
- 2013–2015: Espanyol

Senior career*
Years	Team	Apps	(Gls)
2015–2016	Espanyol B	31	(1)
2016–2017	Granada B	29	(7)
2016–2017	Granada	3	(0)
2017–2018	Alavés	0	(0)
2017–2018	→ Rudeš (loan)	23	(3)
2018–2019	Omonia	6	(0)
2019–2020	Melilla	6	(0)
2020	→ Orihuela (loan)	5	(1)
2021	HIFK	22	(1)
2022	UE Santa Coloma	11	(4)
2022–	Huétor Tájar	63	(8)
- * Club domestic league appearances and goals as of 13 October 2024

Juan Antonio "Juanan" Entrena Gálvez (born 19 May 1996) is a Spanish footballer who plays as a left winger for Huétor Tájar.

== Club career ==
Born in Huétor-Tájar, Granada, Andalusia, Entrena joined FC Barcelona's La Masia in 2011, after spells at Sevilla FC and Granada CF. In July 2013, he moved to RCD Espanyol, being assigned to the Juvenil squad.

Entrena was promoted to the reserves ahead of the 2015–16 season, and made his senior debut on 5 September 2015 by starting in a 3–2 Segunda División B home win against FC Barcelona B. He scored his first senior goal the following 3 January, netting the equalizer in a 2–2 draw at Villarreal CF B.

On 11 August 2016 Entrena moved to another reserve team, Granada CF B also in the third level. He made his first team debut on 30 November, coming on as a late substitute for Javi Márquez in a 1–0 home win against CA Osasuna, for the season's Copa del Rey.

Entrena made his La Liga debut on 6 May 2017, replacing fellow youth graduate Aly Mallé in a 0–4 home loss against Real Madrid. On 6 July, he cut ties with the club. On 7 July, he joined Deportivo Alavés as a free agent, being immediately loaned to Croatian First Football League club NK Rudeš for one year.

On 19 June 2018, Entrena signed for Cypriot First Division side AC Omonia.

On 29 January 2021, Entrena signed for HIFK.
