= Dani Torres (Colombian footballer) =

Colombian footballer (born 1989)

Personal information
- Full name: Daniel Alejandro Torres Rojas
- Date of birth: 15 November 1989 (age 36)
- Place of birth: Cáqueza, Colombia
- Height: 1.83 m (6 ft 0 in)
- Position: Defensive midfielder

Team information
- Current team: Independiente Santa Fe
- Number: 16

Youth career
- Sporting de Cáqueza
- 2005–2008: Independiente Santa Fe

Senior career*
Years	Team	Apps	(Gls)
2008–2015	Independiente Santa Fe	158	(1)
2011	→ Atlético Nacional (loan)	12	(0)
2015–2016	Independiente Medellín	39	(3)
2016–2020	Alavés	41	(0)
2019	→ Albacete (loan)	16	(0)
2020	Zaragoza	12	(0)
2021	Albacete	17	(1)
2021–2022	Castellón	34	(1)
2023–2024	Independiente Medellín	40	(1)
2024–	Independiente Santa Fe	95	(4)

International career
2015–2017	Colombia	14	(0)
Medal record
Colombia
Copa América Centenario
Bronze medal – third place	2016 United States
- * Club domestic league appearances and goals as of 11 December 2025

Daniel Alejandro Torres Rojas (born 15 November 1989) is a Colombian professional footballer who plays as a defensive midfielder for Independiente Santa Fe.

== Club career ==
=== Santa Fe ===
Born in Cáqueza, Cundinamarca, Torres joined Independiente Santa Fe's youth setup in 2005 at the age of 15. He made his senior debut on 8 June 2008, starting in a 0–3 away loss against América de Cali.

On 8 July 2011, Torres was loaned to fellow league team Atlético Nacional until the end of the year, with a buyout clause. However, he only appeared sparingly for the club, being released in the end of the year mainly due to disciplinary problems (some of them related to alcoholism).

Upon returning to Santa Fe, Torres established himself as a regular starter and helped the side in their 2012 and 2014 successful campaigns. He scored his first professional goal on 9 August of the latter year, netting the second in a 2–1 home win against Independiente Medellín.

=== Independiente Medellín ===
On 5 July 2015, Torres and fellow Santa Fe teammate Luis Carlos Arias were transferred to Independiente Medellín. He featured regularly for the side during his spell, scoring two goals in the 2015 season.

=== Alavés ===
On 19 July 2016, Torres signed a four-year contract with Deportivo Alavés, newly promoted to La Liga. He made his debut in the category on 21 August, starting in a 1–1 away draw against Atlético Madrid.

==== Albacete (loan) ====
On 31 January 2019, after featuring rarely during the first half of the campaign, Torres was loaned to Segunda División side Albacete Balompié, for six months.

=== Zaragoza ===
On 31 January 2020, Torres joined Real Zaragoza in the second division until the end of the season, after terminating his contract with Alavés.

=== Albacete return ===
On 7 February 2021, free agent Torres returned to Albacete on a contract until the end of the campaign.

== International career ==
On 6 November 2015, Torres was called up by Colombia national team manager José Pékerman for two 2018 FIFA World Cup qualifying matches against Chile and Argentina. He made his full international debut six days later, playing the full 90 minutes in a 1–1 draw against the former.

Torres was also included in Pékerman's final 23-man list for the Copa América Centenario, featuring regularly as his side finished third.

== Personal life ==
In October 2016, Torres produced a video urging Colombians against supporting the peace deal with FARC. Torres is a devout Christian, who cited his opposition to then president Juan Manuel Santos as that Santos did not put Jesus at the center of his politics.

== Career statistics ==
=== Club ===
As of 5 December 2018

Club performance			League		Cup		Continental		Total	
Club	Season	League	Apps	Goals	Apps	Goals	Apps	Goals	Apps	Goals
Colombia			League		Cup (Note: Includes Copa Colombia and Superliga Colombiana.)		South America		Total	
Santa Fe	2008	Categoría Primera A	5	0	0	0	0	0	5	0
Santa Fe	2009	Categoría Primera A	16	0	0	0	0	0	16	0
Santa Fe	2010	Categoría Primera A	21	0	0	0	6	0	27	0
Santa Fe	2011	Categoría Primera A	13	0	4	0	0	0	17	0
Santa Fe	2012	Categoría Primera A	21	0	6	0	0	0	27	0
Santa Fe	2013	Categoría Primera A	38	0	4	0	0	0	42	0
Santa Fe	2014	Categoría Primera A	36	1	11	0	12	0	59	1
Santa Fe	2015	Categoría Primera A	13	0	2	0	8	1	23	1
Santa Fe	Subtotal		163	1	27	0	26	1	216	2
Atlético Nacional (loan)	2011	Categoría Primera A	12	0	4	0	0	0	16	0
Independiente Medellín	2015	Categoría Primera A	23	2	6	0	8	0	37	2
Independiente Medellín	2016	Categoría Primera A	16	1	1	0	0	0	17	1
Independiente Medellín	Subtotal		39	3	7	0	8	0	54	3
Spain			League		Cup		Europe		Total	
Alavés	2016–17	La Liga	21	0	5	0	0	0	26	0
Alavés	2017–18	La Liga	18	0	5	0	0	0	23	0
Alavés	2018–19	La Liga	2	0	1	0	0	0	3	0
Alavés	Subtotal		41	0	11	0	0	0	52	0
Career total			255	4	49	0	34	1	340	5

== Honours ==
=== Club ===
Santa Fe

- Categoría Primera A: 2012-I, 2014-II, 2025-I
- Copa Colombia: 2009
- Superliga Colombiana: 2013, 2015

=== International ===
Colombia

- Copa América: Third place 2016
