= Anderson Cruz =

Angolan footballer (born 1996)

Personal information
- Full name: Anderson Emanuel Castelo Branco Cruz
- Date of birth: 9 April 1996 (age 30)
- Place of birth: Luanda, Angola
- Height: 1.75 m (5 ft 9 in)
- Position: Winger

Team information
- Current team: Petro de Luanda (on loan from Rio Ave)
- Number: 7

Youth career
- 2004–2009: Mercês
- 2009: Cacém
- 2009–2014: Real Massamá
- 2014: Lourel
- 2014–2015: Varzim

Senior career*
| Years | Team | Apps | (Gls) |
| 2015–2016 | Varzim B | 8 | (1) |
| 2016–2018 | Ourense | 36 | (10) |
| 2016 | → Verín (loan) | 14 | (2) |
| 2017–2018 | → Rápido Bouzas (loan) | 16 | (2) |
| 2018–2020 | Alavés | 0 | (0) |
| 2018 | → Rudeš (loan) | 14 | (3) |
| 2018–2019 | → Sochaux (loan) | 30 | (1) |
| 2019 | → Sochaux II (loan) | 1 | (0) |
| 2019–2020 | → Fuenlabrada (loan) | 24 | (2) |
| 2020–2021 | Bolívar | 0 | (0) |
| 2021– | Rio Ave | 8 | (0) |
| 2022– | → Petro de Luanda (loan) | 0 | (0) |

International career^{‡}
| 2021– | Angola | 1 | (0) |
- * Club domestic league appearances and goals as of 15 December 2021 ‡ National team caps and goals as of 02:29, 4 April 2021 (UTC)

Anderson Emanuel Castelo Branco Cruz (born 9 April 1996) is an Angolan professional footballer who plays as a winger for Petro de Luanda on loan from the Portuguese club Rio Ave, and the Angola national team.

== Club career ==
Born in Luanda, Cruz moved to Lisbon at the age of four and finished his formation with Varzim S.C. He made his senior debut with the reserves in the 2015–16 season.

On 2 February 2016, Cruz signed for Tercera División side Verín CF, on loan from Ourense CF. He returned to his parent club for the 2016–17 campaign, scoring ten goals and achieving promotion to the fourth level.

On 26 August 2017 Cruz moved to Segunda División B side Rápido de Bouzas, still owned by Ourense. The following 18 January, he signed a four-year contract with La Liga side Deportivo Alavés, being immediately loaned to parent club NK Rudeš until the end of the season.

Cruz made his professional debut on 11 February 2018, starting in a 2–2 away draw against NK Lokomotiva. Five days later he scored his first professional goal, as he netted the first in a 2–0 home win against NK Inter Zaprešić.

On 25 May 2018, Cruz was loaned to Ligue 2 side FC Sochaux-Montbéliard until the end of the 2018–19 season. On 27 July of the following year, he moved to Segunda División side CF Fuenlabrada also in a temporary deal.

On 1 September 2020, Cruz signed for Liga Nacional de Fútbol Profesional side Club Bolívar. He made four Copa Libertadores and four Copa Sudamericana appearances for the Bolivian side.

On 28 January 2021, Cruz returned to Portugal and signed a four-and-a-half-year deal with Rio Ave.

In January 2022, Cruz was loaned to Angolan club Petro de Luanda and the loan was subsequently renewed for the 2022–23 season. On 4 July 2023, the loan deal was extended for a third season.

== International career ==
Cruz debuted with the Angola national team in a 2–0 2021 Africa Cup of Nations qualification win over Gabon on 29 March 2021.
