= Víctor López (footballer, born 1997) =

Spanish footballer

Personal information
- Full name: Víctor López Ibáñez
- Date of birth: 12 May 1997 (age 29)
- Place of birth: Logroño, Spain
- Height: 1.78 m (5 ft 10 in)
- Positions: Right back; winger

Team information
- Current team: Calahorra
- Number: 17

Youth career
- Calasancio
- Logroñés
- 2015: Alavés

Senior career*
Years	Team	Apps	(Gls)
2015–2021	Alavés B	136	(15)
2018–2019	Alavés	1	(0)
2018–2019	→ Logroñés (loan)	30	(2)
2021–2022	Algeciras	25	(1)
2022–2023	Amorebieta	15	(0)
2023–2024	Zamora	28	(2)
2024–	Calahorra	5	(0)
- * Club domestic league appearances and goals as of 5 October 2024

Víctor López Ibáñez (born 12 May 1997) is a Spanish professional footballer who plays as either a right back or a right winger for Calahorra.

== Club career ==
Born in Logroño, La Rioja, López joined Deportivo Alavés in 2015, from UD Logroñés, and was initially assigned to the reserves in Tercera División. He scored his first senior goal on 15 November of that year, netting the winner in a 1–0 away success over CD Lagun Onak.

On 8 February 2016, López scored a brace in an 8–1 home routing of CD Basconia. He made his first team debut on 3 January 2018, starting in a 3–1 away win against SD Formentera, for the season's Copa del Rey.

López made his La Liga debut on 6 May 2018, starting in a 3–0 away defeat of Málaga CF. On 7 August, he extended his contract until 2021 and was loaned to Segunda División B side UD Logroñés for one year.

Upon returning, López featured exclusively for the B-team before moving to Primera División RFEF side Algeciras CF on 30 June 2021. On 21 July of the following year, he moved to fellow league team SD Amorebieta.

== Personal life ==
López's uncle Titín III is a Basque pelota player.

== Honours ==
Amorebieta

- Primera Federación: 2022–23
