= Elsa Peretti =

Italian jewelry designer (1940–2021)

Elsa Peretti OMRI OMM
- Born: 1 May 1940; Florence, Italy
- Died: 18 March 2021 (aged 80); Sant Martí Vell, Spain
- Education: Interior designer (degree obtained in Rome, Italy)
- Occupations: Jewelry designer, philanthropist, and fashion model

Elsa Peretti, OMRI OMM (1 May 1940 – 18 March 2021), was an Italian jewelry designer and philanthropist as well as a fashion model. Her jewelry and design pieces for Tiffany & Co. are included in the 20th century collection of the British Museum, the Museum of Fine Arts, Boston and the Museum of Fine Arts, Houston. In 1974 Peretti, the "Halstonette" fashion model arrived at Tiffany's with her modern jewelry. Her broadly popular work, including pieces like Bean, Bone Cuff and Open Heart, became as much as 10% of Tiffany's business and John Loring's Tiffany Style – 170 Years of Design devotes 18 pages of images to her jewelry and tableware design. Vogue described her as "arguably the most successful woman ever to work in the jewelry field." As a philanthropist, Peretti supported a wide variety of causes, and also privately undertook the restoration of the historic village of Sant Martí Vell in Catalonia, Spain.

The TV miniseries Halston features Elsa's relationship with Halston. In 2019, she was featured in archival footage about her relationship with the legendary designer in the documentary film Halston.

== Early life ==
Peretti was born in Florence, Italy as the youngest daughter of Ferdinando Peretti (1896–1977) and Maria Luisa Pighini. Ferdinando Peretti founded Anonima Petroli Italiana (API), a large Italian oil company, in 1933. She was estranged from her conservative family for much of her life, though reconciled with her father shortly before he died.

Peretti was educated in Rome and Switzerland. She initially made her living teaching French and working as a ski instructor in the German-speaking Swiss mountain village of Gstaad. Later, she returned to Rome to pursue a degree in interior design, and then worked for the Milan architect Dado Torrigiani.

== Career ==
=== Modeling ===
In 1964, Peretti became a fashion model, working in Barcelona, Spain. In 1968 she moved to New York City on the advice of Wilhelmina Modeling Agency. In the early 1970s, along with Karen Bjornson, Anjelica Huston, Alva Chinn, Pat Cleveland, Chris Royer, and Pat Ast, among others, she became one of designer Halston's favoured troupe of models, nicknamed the Halstonettes.

During the late 1970s Peretti was a frequent regular of Studio 54, alongside designer Halston, Andy Warhol, Liza Minnelli, Bianca Jagger, Cher, and Donald and Ivana Trump.

According to Halston, "Elsa had style: she made the dress she was modeling her own." Helmut Newton's photograph "Elsa Peretti in Bunny Costume"—she posed for him in a Playboy Bunny costume on Halloween 1975—is considered a lasting image of the 1970s.

In 2019, she was interviewed in the documentary Halston (CNN films), recalling her years of working, partying, and friendship with the designer.

=== Jewelry design ===
In 1969, Peretti began creating new jewelry styles for a handful of fashion designers in Manhattan. Her first design, working with a silversmith in Spain, was a two-inch bud vase made of sterling silver as a pendant on a leather thong necklace, that was inspired by a find at a flea market. Worn in a runway show by one of Giorgio di Sant' Angelo's models, it was a hit. By 1971, she was designing jewelry for Halston. She continued to use silver, helping shift the material's standing from "common" to a popular choice for Liza Minnelli and others. Minnelli recalled encountering Peretti's work after Halston advised her to try wearing silver: " 'My god,' I thought...All I could think of was Albuquerque. But then Elsa brought out all these things...Everything was so sensual, so sexy. I just loved it."

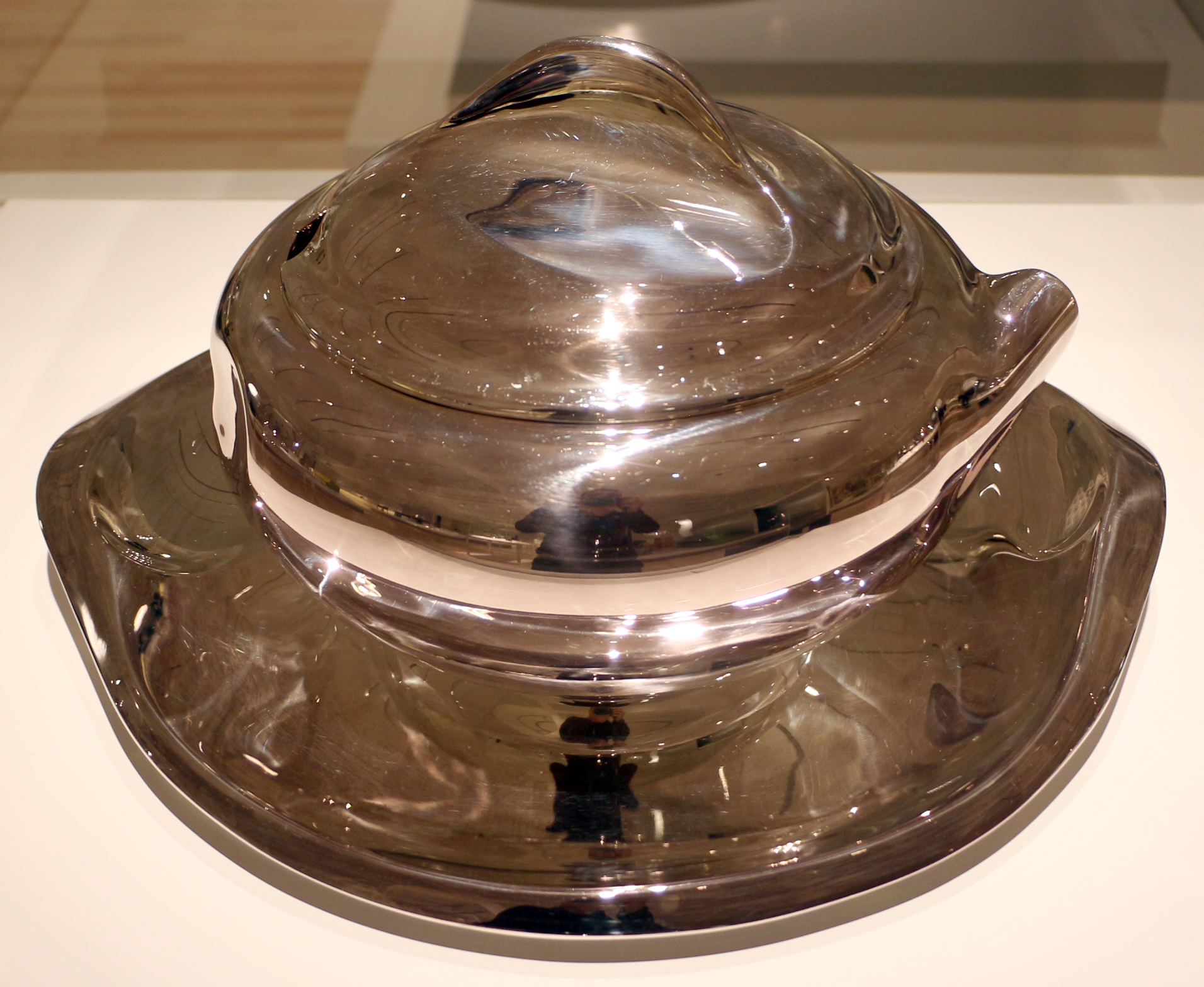
Elsa Peretti, bowl with lid and tray, sterling silver, for Tiffany & Co., 1984

Peretti quickly rose in the jewelry field, receiving the 1971 Coty Award for jewelry design, and had her first appearance in Vogue magazine. In 1972 Bloomingdale's, one of New York's landmark department stores, opened a dedicated Peretti boutique. In 1974, she signed a contract with Tiffany & Co to design silver jewelry; her work for them was the first time Tiffany had sold jewelry in that material in 25 years. By 1979, she was the firm's leading designer. Her silver pieces were seen as "fun" and attracted a younger clientele. The introduction of silver revised the category of fine jewelry and, comparatively more affordable, became something women began increasingly buying for themselves as opposed to traditionally receiving as a gift. Peretti's reintroduction of silver to the company proved so popular that in 2002, the company began raising prices simply to retain a sense of exclusivity for the brand.

Peretti designed over thirty collections for Tiffany, with works described as "revolutionary", "timeless, distinct and modern". Her process included travel to Japan, China, and Europe and drew on the work of craftsmen there in the creation of successful collections such as Bean (an abstracted lima bean-shaped pendant), Open Heart, Mesh, Bone, and Zodiac. In addition to the sterling silver, part of her signature was the use of materials such as jade, lacquer, and rattan. Modern art was an influence; she cited Alexander Calder and Henry Moore's sculptures as inspirations for her Open Heart collection of pendant jewelry featuring an off-center heart outline. Pieces like Bone Cuff (1970) incorporated organic forms with appreciation of the human body, and were seen as bridging a gap between costume and serious jewelry. Peretti drew the shape from the bones of monks she'd seen inside a 17th-century Capuchin church near Rome during her childhood. Enduringly popular, Gal Gadot wore an 18-karat gold version in the 2020 film Wonder Woman 1984 and Sarah Jessica Parker wore it as Carrie Bradshaw in the first Sex and the City film (2008).

The work sold at a large variety of price points, partly dependent on materials; as of 2021, one version of Peretti's Diamonds by the Yard necklace sold for $400 while another was priced at $75,000. In 2012, Tiffany and Peretti extended their contract for another 20 years, paid up front for $47 million. In 2015, her trademarked Elsa Peretti designs represented eight percent of Tiffany's net sales; in other years the figure has been more than 10%.

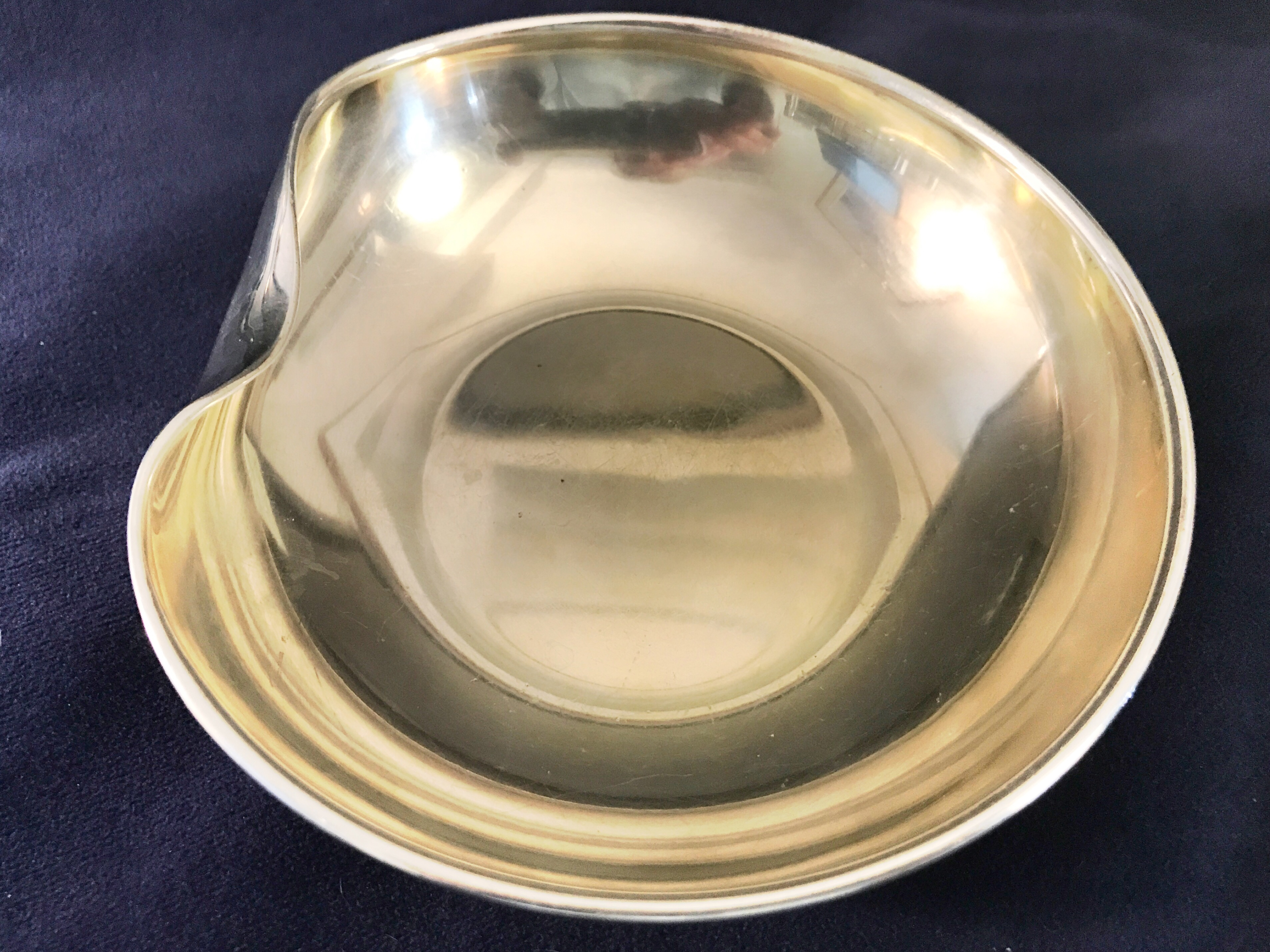
Elsa Peretti sterling bowl with gold wash, for Tiffany & Co.

Peretti also designed silverware for Tiffany, but only after she had established a solid following with her jewelry. Her creations were expansive (besides silverware, which included a silver pizza cutter, she also designed pens, ashtrays, a gold mesh bra, and perfume bottles for Halston (fragrance)), but the jewelry line remained the center of her work. Vogue calls her "arguably the most successful woman ever to work in the jewelry field."

In 2024, Tiffany introduced the Elsa Peretti Split Ring to commemorate the 50th anniversary of Peretti's collaboration with the brand. This ring draws inspiration from Peretti's Bone cuff design.

== Catalonia, Spain ==
In 1968, Peretti bought a house in the largely decrepit village of Sant Martí Vell in Catalonia, Spain. Over the next ten years, she had the house restored, often living in rough conditions during the process. By the 1980s, the mustard-yellow house was her preferred home. Pieces such as her scorpion necklace, now in the British Museum, were inspired by the flora and fauna of Sant Martí Vell.

Originally Peretti described a hope for building an artist colony, but the town became "her own private village", wrote The New York Times. Peretti worked to restore parts of the surrounding village, purchasing additional buildings and having them renovated. As of 2017, about half the village had been rebuilt. Her projects included the renovation of the interior of Església de Sant Martí Vell, the parochial church of Sant Martí Vell in 2012–2013. The site has a long history, encompassing a Roman settlement in the second century AD, a medieval enclosure, a Romanic Temple in the 11th–12th century, and the construction of a late-Gothic-style edifice in the late 1500s. The work done included the excavation of archaeological remains of a Roman settlement and the refinishing of a sepulchral tomb, as well as the restoration of existing elements and the provision of new ones. Peretti also supported the management of the sixteenth-century historical documents of the town, the conservation of the photographic archive of Oriol Maspons and the conservation of the Roman city of Empúries.

Peretti established a working vineyard in Sant Martí, planting Ca l'Elsa in 2004 and Can Nobas in 2007. The winery itself was completed in 2008, marketed under the Eccocivi label.

Peretti also promoted the visual arts and the historical, artistic, and architectural heritage of Catalonia. She encouraged people such as guitarist Michael Laucke and painter-sculptor Robert Llimós to make use of San Marti Vell. In 2013, Peretti was the first non-Catalan person awarded the National Culture Award by the National Council for Culture and the Arts (CoNCA).

== Philanthropy ==
In 2000, Peretti created a charity in honour of her father, called the Nando Peretti Foundation (NPF). The foundation is reported to have given approximately Euro 42 million to 852 projects world-wide over 15 years. As of 2015, it was renamed the Nando and Elsa Peretti Foundation (NaEPF).

Initially, the foundation had a dual focus on the environment and wildlife conservation, and on humanitarian programs, particularly those targeting poverty. Over time, the foundation's scope has expanded to support a broad range of projects for "promotion of human and civil rights, with a special emphasis on the right to education, children's rights, and women's rights and dignity." The NaEPF solicits proposals internationally, especially on behalf of unrepresented minorities, to defend their right to exist and preserve their culture. The NaEPF also supports medical and scientific research projects as well as building hospitals and other facilities.

== Personal life ==
In the 1970s, Peretti was romantically involved with photographer Helmut Newton.

Peretti died at her home in Spain on 18 March 2021 at the age of 80. No cause of death was given; she died in her sleep. Elsa Peretti Holding AG, her family office incorporated in November 2018, is domiciled in Zürich, Switzerland.

== Awards ==
=== Recognition ===
- American Fashion Critics Coty award, 1971: Peretti wins a special award, for her jewelry.
- President's Fellow award, Rhode Island School of Design, 1981
- The Spirit of Achievement Award from the Albert Einstein College, 1982
- Fashion Group "Night of the Stars" award, 1986
- Cultured Pearl Industry award, 1987
- Council of Fashion Designers of America's Accessories Designer of the Year, 1996
- Elsa Peretti Professorship In Jewelry Design: In 2001, Tiffany & Co. established the Elsa Peretti Professorship in Jewelry Design. For the 25th anniversary of its collaboration with Peretti, Tiffany & Co. created a perpetual fund for faculty salary support in the Jewelry Design Department of the Fashion Institute of Technology (FIT). At Peretti's request, the endowment honors her work with Samuel Beizer, founding chairman of FIT's Jewelry Design Department.
- 2013: The National Prize of Culture by the Catalan Government, which is awarded annually to individuals or organizations that have distinguished themselves for their outstanding contribution in their respective cultural areas.
- 2015: Guardó JORGC (Col·legi Oficial de Joiers, d'Orfebres, de Rellotgers i de Gemmòlegs de Catalunya) en reconeixement a la trajectòria global

=== Honors ===
- Grande Ufficiale, Ordine al Merito della Repubblica Italiana (Order of Merit of the Italian Republic)
- Grand Cross pro Merito Melitensi (Order of Malta)
- Honorary member of the Circolo di San Pietro

=== Permanent collections ===
- British Museum: In 2009 the British Museum acquired 30 of Peretti's creations for its 20th century collection. The museum describes Peretti's capacity to produce objects, which come from different parts of the world as unique, noting that they combine "superb craftsmanship and symbolic meaning in a modern age".
- Indianapolis Museum of Art, Indiana
- Museum of Fine Arts in Boston, Massachusetts
- Museum of Fine Arts in Houston, Texas

=== Exhibitions ===
- Fifteen of My Fifty with Tiffany, Fashion Institute of Technology, New York, 1990
- Retrospective, Tiffany's stores worldwide, 2001

== See also ==
- Xavier Corberó
