= Naeem Khan =

Indian-American fashion designer (born 1958)

- نعیم خان
- Born: Naeemuddin Khan; May 21, 1958 (age 68); Mumbai, Maharashtra, India
- Occupation: Fashion designer
- Spouse: Ranjana Kapadia (m. 1981–2019)
- Children: 2
- Website: www.naeemkhan.com

Naeem Khan (born May 21, 1958) is an Indian-American fashion designer based in New York City known for his ornate and intricately detailed gowns, and for dressing First Lady Michelle Obama, Queen Noor of Jordan, and the Princess of Wales.

== Early and personal life ==
Naeemuddin Khan was born on May 21, 1958 to Sharfuddin Khan and Razia Baig in Bareilly, India. His father and grandfather cultivated an early interest in textiles, as they both designed intricate clothing worn by the royal families. Of his early passion for design, Khan has said, "It was built into my DNA. I watched my father design formal wear for India's most influential people, and I knew that I would want to pursue a similar path."

In 1981, at the age of 23, he married model and jewellery designer Ranjana Kapadia, with whom he has two sons, Zaheen and Shariq.

Khan lives in New York City, and Miami, Florida

== Career ==
In 1978, Khan moved to the United States to apprentice for legendary American designer Halston. During this time, he mastered the art of draping and garment construction, and worked with cultural icons such as Liza Minnelli, Andy Warhol, and Elizabeth Taylor. Of this period, Khan says, "My knowledge of fashion and lifestyle is much influenced by my time with Halston… as a designer you have to be aware of the various arts, travels, cinema, museums, culture and geography in order to be a world recognized brand." In 2019, he was interviewed for the documentary film Halston.

Khan spent several years after his apprenticeship continuing to work with Halston on a freelance basis, going on to launch fashion house Riazee in 1981, a clothing label named after his mother that was carried in prominent American retail stores for about a decade.

In 2003, he launched his eponymous label and began selling at Bergdorf Goodman, Neiman Marcus, and Saks Fifth Avenue. He also began showing his collections at New York Fashion Week with immediate reception by the world's top retailers and notable celebrities. Khan's gowns have been worn by Beyoncé, Taylor Swift, Jennifer Lopez, Penélope Cruz, Katy Perry and Kate Hudson, among others. First Lady Michelle Obama has worn the brand on over ten occasions, beginning in 2009 at her first state dinner. In April 2016, the then Duchess of Cambridge, wore a Naeem Khan dress on her visit to the Taj Mahal with Prince William in Agra, India.

In 2008, Khan was inducted as a member of the prestigious Council of Fashion Designers of America. Khan launched his first bridal collection in 2013.

== Sources ==
1. Naeem Khan on Designing Michelle Obama’s “Priceless” First State Dinner Dress
2. Bowers, Paige (2009). "Starlet, Star Bright", Palm Beach Illustrated, January.
3. Reuters.com, April 13th, 2009.
4. First Lady Wears Naeem Khan Gown to State Dinner, ABC News, November 24, 2009.
5. http://www.gossipgirlfashion.net/ Leighton Meester as Blair Waldorf, Retrieved May 21, 2012
