= Pere Pons =

Spanish footballer

Personal information
- Full name: Pere Pons Riera
- Date of birth: 20 February 1993 (age 33)
- Place of birth: Sant Martí Vell, Spain
- Height: 1.77 m (5 ft 10 in)
- Position: Defensive midfielder

Team information
- Current team: Sabadell
- Number: 8

Youth career
- 2002–2012: Girona

Senior career*
Years	Team	Apps	(Gls)
2012	Girona B	8	(1)
2012–2019	Girona	197	(4)
2014	→ Olot (loan)	14	(0)
2019–2022	Alavés	79	(4)
2022–2026	AEK Larnaca	131	(11)
2026–	Sabadell	1	(0)

International career
2016–2019	Catalonia	2	(0)
- * Club domestic league appearances and goals as of 16:32, 19 August 2026 (UTC)

Pere Pons Riera (born 20 February 1993) is a Spanish professional footballer who plays as a defensive midfielder for Segunda División club Sabadell.

== Club career ==
=== Girona ===
Born in Sant Martí Vell, Girona, Catalonia, Pons joined Girona FC's youth setup in 2002, aged nine. He started his senior career with the reserves in the regional leagues.

On 13 September 2012, Pons made his first-team debut, coming on as a second-half substitute for Joseba Garmendia in a 2–0 away loss to Sporting de Gijón in the second round of the Copa del Rey. He first appeared in the Segunda División three days later, again replacing Garmendia in the 5–0 home rout of UD Las Palmas.

Pons scored his first professional goal on 6 October 2013, opening a 1–1 home draw against CE Sabadell FC. On 29 January 2014, he was loaned to Segunda División B side UE Olot until June. He subsequently returned to Girona in the summer, and was made first choice by manager Pablo Machín.

On 21 November 2014, Pons renewed his contract with the club, signing until 2017. He contributed two goals in 38 matches during the 2016–17 campaign, in a first-ever promotion to La Liga.

Pons agreed to an extension on 15 August 2017, until 2020. He made his debut in the top flight four days later, starting in a 2–2 home draw with Atlético Madrid.

Pons scored his first goal in the main division on 3 November 2018, the only away against Valencia CF.

=== Alavés ===
On 4 July 2019, after suffering relegation, Pons signed a three-year deal with Deportivo Alavés still in the top tier. He totalled 82 games during his spell at the Mendizorrotza Stadium, scoring his first goal on 17 December 2019 in a 3–1 defeat at amateurs Real Jaén in the domestic cup.

=== AEK Larnaca ===
On 31 August 2022, Pons moved to Cypriot First Division side AEK Larnaca FC on a two-year contract. In August 2024, the 31-year-old signed a two-year extension with the club.

=== Later career ===
On 13 July 2026, the free agent Pons agreed to a one-year deal at Sabadell in his country's second division.

== International career ==
On 28 December 2016, Pons made his debut for the Catalonia national team, coming on as a half-time substitute for Sergi Roberto in a 3–3 draw against Tunisia (4–2 penalty loss).

== Career statistics ==
As of match played on 11 May 2024

Appearances and goals by club, season and competition
Club	Season	League			Cup		Continental		Other		Total	
Club	Season	Division	Apps	Goals	Apps	Goals	Apps	Goals	Apps	Goals	Apps	Goals
Girona	2012–13	Segunda División	9	0	1	0	—		—		10	0
Girona	2013–14	Segunda División	10	1	3	0	—		—		13	1
Girona	2014–15	Segunda División	42	0	1	0	—		—		43	0
Girona	2015–16	Segunda División	39	0	0	0	—		—		10	0
Girona	2016–17	Segunda División	39	2	0	0	—		—		39	2
Girona	2017–18	La Liga	31	0	0	0	—		—		31	0
Girona	2018–19	La Liga	34	1	2	0	—		—		36	1
Girona	Total		204	4	7	0	—		—		211	4
Olot (loan)	2013–14	Segunda División B	14	0	0	0	—		—		14	0
Alavés	2019–20	La Liga	30	1	1	1	—		—		31	2
Alavés	2020–21	La Liga	22	2	1	0	—		—		23	1
Alavés	2021–22	La Liga	27	1	1	0	—		—		28	1
Alavés	Total		79	4	3	1	—		—		82	5
AEK Larnaca	2022–23	Cypriot First Division	30	4	0	0	9	0	—		39	4
AEK Larnaca	2023–24	Cypriot First Division	34	4	2	0	4	1	—		40	5
AEK Larnaca	Total		64	8	2	0	13	1	0	0	79	9
Career total			361	16	12	1	13	1	0	0	386	18

== Honours ==
AEK Larnaca

- Cypriot Cup: 2024–25
