= Dior and I =

- Theatrical release poster
- French: Dior et moi
- Directed by: Frédéric Tcheng
- Written by: Frédéric Tcheng
- Produced by: Guillaume de Roquemaurel; Frédéric Tcheng
- Starring: Raf Simons
- Cinematography: Gilles Piquard
- Edited by: Julio C. Perez IV
- Music by: Ha-Yang Kim
- Production company: CIM Productions
- Distributed by: Dissidenz Films
- Release dates: 17 April 2014 (Tribeca Film Festival); 8 July 2015 (France)
- Running time: 90 minutes
- Country: France
- Languages: French; English; Italian
- Box office: $1.8 million

Dior and I (French: Dior et moi) is a 2014 French documentary film written and directed by Frédéric Tcheng about designer Raf Simons' creative work for Christian Dior S.A. The film premiered at the Tribeca Film Festival on 17 April 2014. It was released theatrically in the United States on 10 April 2015 by The Orchard and in France on 8 July 2015 by Dissidenz Films. The film is centered upon Simons' debut season at Dior and includes non-speaking cameo appearances by Marion Cotillard, Isabelle Huppert, Jennifer Lawrence, Sharon Stone and Harvey Weinstein. The documentary received positive reviews by critics.

== Production ==
Filmed in 2012 in eight weeks, Dior and I is a behind the scene look at designer Raf Simons’ first Haute Couture collection for Dior. The documentary weaves together past and present through excerpts from founder Christian Dior’s autobiography read by poet Omar Berrada.

Tcheng discovered Christian Dior’s autobiography Dior by Dior while researching the film. Dior’s intimate writing inspired him to focus on the human experience of the creative process. “When I reread passages during the shoot, I often felt as though I was reading a description of exactly what I had witnessed that day. The process and emotions were the same, despite the half-century gap in time.” Paul Dallas in Bomb called the effect “haunting and emotional—which is appropriate, given that Dior and I is essentially a ghost story.”

The first time he actually met Simons, Tcheng was behind the camera, filming his arrival at Dior, where he meets the haute couture seamstresses for the first time. ‘It was tense, as Simons was initially against the idea [of being filmed],’ Tcheng says. ‘I had sent him a letter explaining my process and what I was interested in – the collaboration with the seamstresses, and how those two worlds would collide and create something new.’ He got the OK to film for a week, and worked with just one cameraman. ‘Once Raf gave access, he gave a lot of access,’ Tcheng says. ‘I did not expect the level of emotion that Raf brought,’ he adds. The film centers on the tension between modernity and tradition, between the influence of the founder’s style and the need to create something new. Tcheng cites Hitchcock’s Rebecca as an influence in its depiction of a house haunted by a ghost.

The atelier is the first place that Tcheng and his crew started filming. The film presents an ensemble cast with the premieres d’atelier Florence Chehet and Monique Bailly featured as much as Raf Simons.

== Release ==
The film premiered as the opening documentary feature of the 2014 Tribeca Film Festival.

== Reception ==
On Rotten Tomatoes, the film holds an approval rating of 84% based on 73 reviews, with an average rating of 6.90/10. The site's critics consensus reads: "Dior and I will obviously appeal to fashion fans, but this beautifully tailored documentary may draw in even the least sartorially inclined." On Metacritic, it has a weighted average score of 70 out of 100, based on 25 critics, indicating "generally favorable reviews". Jay Weissberg of Variety wrote: “Fast-rising helmer Frederic Tcheng privileges the creative process over stereotyped glamor or backstabbing in this multilayered, meticulously woven docu.” Opening in 2015 in select theaters to positive reviews, the film went on to gross more than $1 million.

Dior and I ranked #3 on The Hollywood Reporter’s 2019 list of Best Fashion Documentaries of the Decade.

== Accolades ==
Year	Award / Film festival	Category	Recipients	Result	Ref.
2014	Seattle International Film Festival	Documentary Special Jury Award	Frédéric Tcheng	Won	
2014	Seattle International Film Festival	Documentary Award	Frédéric Tcheng	Nominated	
2014	Abu Dhabi Film Festival	Best Documentary Feature	Frédéric Tcheng	Nominated	
2014	Tribeca Festival	Best Documentary Feature	Frédéric Tcheng	Nominated	
2014	Melbourne International Film Festival	Best Documentary	Frédéric Tcheng	Nominated	

== See also ==
- Christian Dior
