= King Georges =

- Directed by: Erika Frankel
- Cinematography: Frédéric Tcheng
- Release date: 2015
- Country: United States
- Language: English

King Georges is a 2015 American documentary film written and directed by Erika Frankel. The film follows world-renowned French chef Georges Perrier, and his downfall that saw his Philadelphia-based Le Bec-Fin restaurant shutter.

== Synopsis ==
The film follows chef Georges Perrier, and his Philadelphia-based restaurant Le Bec-Fin. The restaurant was considered to be one of the best in the United States, but the chef shuttered the location after over 40 years of operation.

The film's focus is on a chef past their prime, but highlights the close relationship he has mentoring his apprentice.
