= 2019–20 Deportivo Alavés season =

Alavés
2019–20 season
- President: Alfonso Fernández de Trocóniz
- Head coach: Asier Garitano (until 5 July); Juan Ramón López Muñiz (interim, from 5 July)
- Stadium: Mendizorrotza Stadium
- La Liga: 16th
- Copa del Rey: First round
- Top goalscorer: League: Lucas Pérez (11); All: Lucas Pérez (11)
- Highest home attendance: 19,357 (vs Real Madrid, 30 November 2019)
- Lowest home attendance: 10,053 (vs Levante, 18 August 2019)
- Average home league attendance: 15,433
- Biggest win: Alavés 3–0 Valladolid
- Biggest defeat: Celta Vigo 6–0 Alavés
Home colours	Away colours	Third colours

The 2019–20 Deportivo Alavés season was the club's 108th season in existence and the club's 15th season in the top flight of Spanish football. It covered a period from 1 July 2019 to 19 July 2020. Alavés competed in La Liga and Copa del Rey.

== Players ==
=== Squad information ===
As of 1 February 2020

Note: Flags indicate national team as defined under FIFA eligibility rules; some limited exceptions apply. Players may hold more than one non-FIFA nationality.

No.	Pos.	Nation	Player
1	GK	ESP	Fernando Pacheco (3rd captain)
3	DF	ESP	Rubén Duarte
4	DF	BRA	Rodrigo Ely
5	DF	ESP	Víctor Laguardia (vice-captain)
6	DF	ARG	Lisandro Magallán (on loan from Ajax)
7	FW	ESP	Lucas Pérez
8	MF	ESP	Tomás Pina
9	FW	ESP	Joselu
10	MF	ESP	Víctor Camarasa (on loan from Betis)
11	FW	ESP	Luis Rioja
12	DF	ESP	Rafa Navarro
13	GK	ESP	Roberto (on loan from West Ham United)
14	MF	ESP	Burgui

No.	Pos.	Nation	Player
15	MF	SRB	Ljubomir Fejsa (on loan from Benfica)
16	MF	ESP	Édgar Méndez
17	DF	ESP	Adrián Marín
18	MF	ESP	Aleix Vidal (on loan from Sevilla)
19	MF	ESP	Manu García (captain)
20	MF	ESP	Pere Pons
21	DF	ESP	Martín Aguirregabiria
23	DF	ESP	Ximo Navarro
24	FW	SCO	Oliver Burke (on loan from West Brom)
27	DF	ESP	Tachi
29	MF	ESP	Borja Sainz
31	GK	ESP	Aritz Castro
35	MF	ESP	Ismael Gutiérrez (on loan from Betis)

=== Out of first team ===
Note: Flags indicate national team as defined under FIFA eligibility rules; some limited exceptions apply. Players may hold more than one non-FIFA nationality.

No.	Pos.	Nation	Player
—	DF	CMR	Jeando Fuchs

=== Out on loan ===
Note: Flags indicate national team as defined under FIFA eligibility rules; some limited exceptions apply. Players may hold more than one non-FIFA nationality.

No.	Pos.	Nation	Player
—	GK	ESP	Antonio Sivera (at (Spain) Almería until 30 June 2020)
—	DF	BEN	Olivier Verdon (at (Belgium) Eupen until 30 June 2020)
—	DF	ESP	Einar Galilea (at (Croatia) NK Istra until 30 June 2020)
—	DF	ESP	Adrián Diéguez (at (Spain) Alcorcón until 30 June 2020)
—	DF	ESP	Saúl García (at (Spain) Rayo Vallecano until 30 June 2020)
—	DF	ESP	Rafa Páez (at (Croatia) NK Istra until 30 June 2021)

No.	Pos.	Nation	Player
—	MF	ESP	Javi Muñoz (at (Spain) Tenerife until 30 June 2020)
—	FW	SWE	John Guidetti (at (Germany) Hannover 96 until 30 June 2020)
—	FW	ANG	Anderson Emanuel (at (Spain) Fuenlabrada until 30 June 2020)
—	FW	BIH	Ermedin Demirović (at (Switzerland) St. Gallen until 30 June 2020)
—	FW	ARG	Ramón Miérez (at (Spain) Tenerife until 30 June 2020)
—	FW	GHA	Patrick Twumasi (at (Turkey) Gazişehir until 30 June 2020)

== Transfers ==
=== In ===
Date	Player	From	Type	Fee	Ref
30 June 2019	(Angola) Anderson	(France) Sochaux	Loan return		
30 June 2019	(Spain) Antonio Cristian	Fuenlabrada	Loan return		
30 June 2019	(Bosnia and Herzegovina) Ermedin Demirović	Almería	Loan return		
30 June 2019	(Spain) Adrián Diéguez	Huesca	Loan return		
30 June 2019	(Spain) Javi Muñoz	Oviedo	Loan return		
30 June 2019	(Spain) Nando	Extremadura	Loan return		
30 June 2019	(Spain) Rafa Navarro	(France) Sochaux	Loan return		
30 June 2019	(Colombia) Daniel Torres	Albacete	Loan return		
1 July 2019	(Cameroon) Jeando Fuchs	(France) Sochaux	Transfer	Undisclosed	
1 July 2019	(Spain) Saúl García	Deportivo La Coruña	Transfer	Free	
1 July 2019	(Argentina) Ramón Mierez	(Argentina) Tigre	Transfer	€2.2M	
1 July 2019	(Spain) Lucas Pérez	(England) West Ham United	Transfer	€2.3M	
1 July 2019	(Spain) Luis Rioja	Almería	Transfer	€2M	
1 July 2019	(Benin) Olivier Verdon	(France) Sochaux	Transfer	Undisclosed	
4 July 2019	(Spain) Pere Pons	Girona	Transfer	€2M	
15 July 2019	(Spain) Joselu	(England) Newcastle United	Transfer	€2.2M	
19 July 2019	(Spain) Tachi	Atlético Madrid B	Transfer	Free	
28 July 2019	(Spain) Aleix Vidal	Sevilla	Loan		
30 August 2019	(Scotland) Oliver Burke	(England) West Bromwich Albion	Loan		
2 September 2019	(Argentina) Lisandro Magallán	(Netherlands) Ajax	Loan		
14 January 2020	(Spain) Víctor Camarasa	Real Betis	Loan		
20 January 2020	(Spain) Roberto	(England) West Ham United	Loan		
27 January 2020	(Cameroon) Jeando Fuchs	(Israel) Maccabi Haifa	Loan return		
29 January 2020	(Serbia) Ljubomir Fejsa	(Portugal) Benfica	Loan		
31 January 2020	(Spain) Édgar Méndez	(Mexico) Cruz Azul	Transfer	Undisclosed	

=== Out ===
Date	Player	To	Type	Fee	Ref
30 June 2019	(Spain) Borja Bastón	(Wales) Swansea City	Loan return		
30 June 2019	(Spain) Álex Blanco	Valencia	Loan return		
30 June 2019	(Serbia) Darko Brašanac	Real Betis	Loan return		
30 June 2019	(Argentina) Jonathan Calleri	(Uruguay) Deportivo Maldonado	Loan return		
30 June 2019	(Japan) Takashi Inui	Real Betis	Loan return		
30 June 2019	(Spain) Jony	Málaga	Loan return		
30 June 2019	(Uruguay) Diego Rolán	Deportivo La Coruña	Loan return		
9 July 2019	(Spain) Antonio Cristian	Fuenlabrada	Contract termination		
11 July 2019	(Spain) Carlos Vigaray	Zaragoza	Transfer	Free	
27 July 2019	(Angola) Anderson	Fuenlabrada	Loan		
28 July 2019	(Spain) Adrián Diéguez	Alcorcón	Loan		
5 August 2019	(Argentina) Ramón Mierez	Tenerife	Loan		
16 August 2019	(Ghana) Patrick Twumasi	(Turkey) Gazişehir Gaziantep	Loan		
24 August 2019	(Chile) Guillermo Maripán	(France) Monaco	Transfer	€18M	
2 September 2019	(Bosnia and Herzegovina) Ermedin Demirović	(Switzerland) St. Gallen	Loan		
2 September 2019	(Spain) Saúl García	Rayo Vallecano	Loan		
2 September 2019	(Spain) Nando	(Poland) Arka Gdynia	Transfer	Free	
2 September 2019	(Benin) Olivier Verdon	(Belgium) Eupen	Loan		
14 January 2020	(Spain) Antonio Sivera	Alavés	Loan		
17 January 2020	(Sweden) John Guidetti	(Germany) Hannover 96	Loan		
18 January 2020	(Ghana) Mubarak Wakaso	(China) Jiangsu Suning	Transfer	Undisclosed	
31 January 2020	(Spain) Javier Muñoz	Tenerife	Loan		
31 January 2020	(Colombia) Dani Torres	Real Zaragoza	Transfer	Free	

▲ Total Income: €18M

Net Income: ▲€7.3M

== Pre-season and friendlies ==
Win Draw Loss

19 July 2019 Friendly	Leioa	2–3	Alavés	Leioa, Spain
16:00 CEST (UTC+2)	Martín 76', 86'	Report	Demirović 45'; Marín 50'; Rioja 80'

25 July 2019 Friendly	Alavés	0–1	Fuenlabrada	Los Ángeles de San Rafael, Spain
15:00 CEST (UTC+2)		Report

27 July 2019 Friendly	Albacete	1–2	Alavés	Los Ángeles de San Rafael, Spain
18:00 CEST (UTC+2)		Report

31 July 2019 Friendly	Real Sociedad	1–0	Alavés	Lasarte-Oria, Spain
19:00 CEST (UTC+2)				Stadium: Zubieta Facilities

3 August 2019 Friendly	Alavés	1–0	Racing Santander	Guardia, Spain
18:30 CEST (UTC+2)		Report		Stadium: Campo de Futbol El Prao

7 August 2019 Friendly	Real Zaragoza	0–0 (3–2 p)	Alavés	Zaragoza, Spain
20:30 CEST (UTC+2)		Report		Stadium: La Romareda

10 August 2019 Friendly	Sporting de Gijón	0–0	Alavés	Avilés, Spain
12:00 CEST (UTC+2)		Report		Stadium: Estadio Román Suárez Puerta

10 August 2019 Friendly	Real Oviedo	1–2	Alavés	Avilés, Spain
19:30 CEST (UTC+2)		Report		Stadium: Estadio Román Suárez Puerta

5 September 2019 Friendly	Real Sociedad	0–0	Alavés	Tafalla, Spain
18:00 CEST (UTC+2)		Report		Stadium: Campo San Francisco

== Competitions ==
Win Draw Loss

=== Overview ===
Competition	First match	Last match	Starting round	Final position	Record							
Competition	First match	Last match	Starting round	Final position	Pld	W	D	L	GF	GA	GD	Win %
La Liga	18 August 2019	19 July 2020	Matchday 1	16th	38	10	9	19	34	59	−25	26.32
Copa del Rey	17 December 2019		First round	First round	1	0	0	1	1	3	−2	0.00
Total					39	10	9	20	35	62	−27	25.64

Last updated: 19 July 2020.
Source: Competitions

=== La Liga ===
==== Standings ====
Pos	Team	Pld	W	D	L	GF	GA	GD	Pts	Qualification or relegation
14	Eibar	38	11	9	18	39	56	−17	42	
15	Real Betis	38	10	11	17	48	60	−12	41	
16	Alavés	38	10	9	19	34	59	−25	39	
17	Celta Vigo	38	7	16	15	37	49	−12	37	
18	Leganés (R)	38	8	12	18	30	51	−21	36	Relegation to Segunda División

Source: La Liga, Soccerway
Rules for classification: 1) Points; 2) Head-to-head points; 3) Head-to-head goal difference; 4) Goal difference; 5) Goals scored; 6) Fair-play points (Note: Head-to-head record is used only after all the matches between the teams in question have been played)
(R) Relegated

==== Results summary ====
Overall								Home						Away					
Pld	W	D	L	GF	GA	GD	Pts	W	D	L	GF	GA	GD	W	D	L	GF	GA	GD
38	10	9	19	34	59	−25	39	7	6	6	20	19	+1	3	3	13	14	40	−26

Last updated: 19 July 2020.
Source: La Liga

==== Results by round ====
Round	1	2	3	4	5	6	7	8	9	10	11	12	13	14	15	16	17	18	19	20	21	22	23	24	25	26	27	28	29	30	31	32	33	34	35	36	37	38
Ground	H	H	A	H	A	A	H	A	H	A	H	A	H	A	H	A	H	A	H	A	H	A	H	A	H	A	H	A	H	A	H	A	H	A	A	H	A	H
Result	W	D	D	L	L	L	W	L	W	L	D	L	W	W	L	L	D	L	D	W	L	D	W	L	W	D	D	L	W	L	L	L	L	L	L	D	W	L
Position	8	8	9	11	13	17	14	17	14	14	15	16	14	13	14	15	14	15	15	14	14	15	14	14	14	13	14	14	12	13	14	16	15	15	17	17	15	16

Updated to match(es) played on 19 July 2020. Source: La Liga
A = Away; H = Home; W = Win; D = Draw; L = Loss

==== Matches ====
The La Liga schedule was announced on 4 July 2019.

18 August 2019 1	Alavés	1–0	Levante	Vitoria-Gasteiz
17:00 CEST (UTC+2)	Joselu (yellow card) 37', (goal) 54'; García (yellow card) 65'	Report	Melero (yellow card) 45'	Stadium: Mendizorrotza Stadium; Attendance: 10,053; Referee: César Soto Grado

25 August 2019 2	Alavés	0–0	Espanyol	Vitoria-Gasteiz
17:00 CEST (UTC+2)	Pina (yellow card) 7'; Wakaso (yellow card) 40'; Vidal (yellow card) 83'	Report	Vilà (yellow card) 55'	Stadium: Mendizorrotza Stadium; Attendance: 14,567; Referee: Eduardo Prieto Iglesias

31 August 2019 3	Getafe	1–1	Alavés	Getafe
19:00 CEST (UTC+2)	Molina (yellow card) 12', (goal) 24'; Arambarri (yellow card) 33'; Bergara (yellow card) 89'	Report	Joselu 31'; Wakaso (yellow card) 89'	Stadium: Coliseum Alfonso Pérez; Attendance: 10,806; Referee: Mario Melero López

15 September 2019 4	Alavés	0–1	Sevilla	Vitoria-Gasteiz
14:00 CEST (UTC+2)	Burke (yellow card) 47'; Duarte (yellow card) 77'; Sainz (yellow card) 90+1'; Laguardia (yellow card) 90+2'; Wakaso (yellow card) 90+2'	Report	Jordán 52'; Carriço (yellow card) 58'; Reguilón (yellow card) 75'; Gudelj (yellow card) 90'; Diego Carlos (yellow card) 90+2'; Ocampos (yellow card) 90+2'	Stadium: Mendizorrotza Stadium; Attendance: 16,309; Referee: Alejandro Hernández Hernández

22 September 2019 5	Athletic Bilbao	2–0	Alavés	Bilbao
18:30 CEST (UTC+2)	R. García 38' (pen.); Muniain 72'; Simón (yellow card) 86'	Report	Ely (yellow card) 7'; Vidal (yellow card) 15'; Duarte (yellow card) 37'; Laguardia (yellow card) 70'	Stadium: San Mamés; Attendance: 45,143; Referee: Jesús Gil Manzano

26 September 2019 6	Real Sociedad	3–0	Alavés	San Sebastián
21:00 CEST (UTC+2)	Oyarzabal 19', 41' (pen.); Willian José 32'; Portu (yellow card) 27'	Report	Wakaso (yellow card) 27'; Pina (yellow card) 49'; García (yellow card) 74' (yellow-red card) 85'	Stadium: Anoeta; Attendance: 28,720; Referee: David Medié Jiménez

29 September 2019 7	Alavés	2–0	Mallorca	Vitoria-Gasteiz
16:00 CEST (UTC+2)	Wakaso (yellow card) 27'; Navarro (yellow card) 50'; Pérez 76' (pen.); Joselu 86'	Report	Junior (yellow card) 33'; Sevilla (yellow card) 78'; Valjent (yellow card) 79'	Stadium: Mendizorrotza Stadium; Attendance: 17,135; Referee: Carlos del Cerro Grande

5 October 2019 8	Valencia	2–1	Alavés	Valencia
18:30 CEST (UTC+2)	Wass (yellow card) 14'; Gómez 27'; Parejo 80' (pen.)	Report	Duarte (yellow card) 15'; García (yellow card) 15'; Sivera (yellow card) 82'; Pérez 89'	Stadium: Mestalla; Attendance: 39,073; Referee: Eduardo Prieto Iglesias

20 October 2019 9	Alavés	2–0	Celta Vigo	Vitoria-Gasteiz
12:00 CEST (UTC+2)	Wakaso (yellow card) 31'; Duarte (yellow card) 38'; García (yellow card) 45+4'; Magallán 50', (yellow card) 90'; Pérez 82', (yellow card) 90+3'	Report	Juncà (yellow card) 26'	Stadium: Mendizorrotza Stadium; Attendance: 16,584; Referee: José Luis González González

25 October 2019 10	Villarreal	4–1	Alavés	Villarreal
21:00 CEST (UTC+2)	Toko Ekambi 13', 66'; Mario (yellow card) 53'; Torres (yellow card) 77'; Gerard 84'; Ontiveros 90+1'	Report	Joselu (yellow card) 23'; Pérez 50'; Magallán (yellow card) 65'	Stadium: Estadio de la Cerámica; Attendance: 16,049; Referee: David Medié Jiménez

29 October 2019 11	Alavés	1–1	Atlético Madrid	Vitoria-Gasteiz
19:00 CET (UTC+1)	Wakaso (yellow card) 29'; Laguardia (yellow card) 61'; Pérez 83'; García (yellow card) 89'	Report	Llorente (yellow card) 16'; Morata 70'; Felipe (yellow card) 75'; Hermoso (yellow card) 89'	Stadium: Mendizorrotza Stadium; Attendance: 17,235; Referee: Xavier Estrada Fernández

3 November 2019 12	Osasuna	4–2	Alavés	Pamplona
16:00 CET (UTC+1)	R. García 20'; Ávila 26', (yellow card) 41'; Torres 45+6' (pen.); Villar 55' (pen.); Mérida (yellow card) 69'; Cardona (yellow card) 84'; Estupiñán (yellow card) 90+2'	Report	Magallán (yellow card) 10'; Laguardia 27', (yellow card) 84'; Pérez 51' (pen.)	Stadium: El Sadar; Attendance: 16,006; Referee: José Luis Munuera Montero

9 November 2019 13	Alavés	3–0	Valladolid	Vitoria-Gasteiz
13:00 CET (UTC+1)	Laguardia (yellow card) 6'; Joselu 26'; Pina 32'; García (yellow card) 33'; Rioja (yellow card) 59'; Pérez 75' (pen.)	Report	Barba (yellow card) 31'; Alcaraz (yellow card) 75'; Porro (yellow card) 85'	Stadium: Mendizorrotza Stadium; Attendance: 12,226; Referee: Mario Melero López

24 November 2019 14	Eibar	0–2	Alavés	Eibar
16:00 CET (UTC+1)	Arbilla (yellow card) 88'	Report	Navarro (yellow card) 37'; Wakaso (yellow card) 80'; Joselu 85', 90+1'	Stadium: Ipurua Municipal Stadium; Attendance: 6,315; Referee: Antonio Mateu Lahoz

30 November 2019 15	Alavés	1–2	Real Madrid	Vitoria-Gasteiz
13:00 CET (UTC+1)	Vidal (yellow card) 7'; Pina (yellow card) 45+1'; Pérez 65' (pen.), (yellow card) 67'; Duarte (yellow card) 79'	Report	Modrić (yellow card) 32'; Ramos 52', (yellow card) 63'; Carvajal 69'; Militão (yellow card) 80'	Stadium: Mendizorrotza Stadium; Attendance: 19,357; Referee: Guillermo Cuadra Fernández

7 December 2019 16	Granada	3–0	Alavés	Granada
16:00 CET (UTC+1)	Fernández 48'; Soldado (yellow card) 51', (goal) 58' (pen.); Herrera 77'	Report	Navarro (yellow card) 28'; Wakaso (yellow card) 40' (yellow-red card) 67'; García (yellow card) 63'; Laguardia (red card) 90+1'	Stadium: Nuevo Los Cármenes; Attendance: 14,773; Referee: Jesús Gil Manzano

13 December 2019 17	Alavés	1–1	Leganés	Vitoria-Gasteiz
21:00 CET (UTC+1)	Ely (yellow card) 2'; Joselu (yellow card) 42', (goal) 81'	Report	En-Nesyri (yellow card) 8'; Braithwaite 43'; Omeruo (yellow card) 61'; Silva (yellow card) 72'	Stadium: Mendizorrotza Stadium; Attendance: 11,247; Referee: César Soto Grado

21 December 2019 18	Barcelona	4–1	Alavés	Barcelona
16:00 CET (UTC+1)	Griezmann 14'; Vidal 45'; Umtiti (yellow card) 67'; Messi 69'; Suárez 75' (pen.); Alba (yellow card) 88'	Report	Pons 56'; Vidal (yellow card) 66'; Wakaso (yellow card) 67'; Aguirregabiria (yellow card) 74'; Ely (yellow card) 84'	Stadium: Camp Nou; Attendance: 63,054; Referee: Mario Melero López

5 January 2020 19	Alavés	1–1	Real Betis	Vitoria-Gasteiz
16:00 CET (UTC+1)	Vidal 14'; Joselu (yellow card) 22'; Wakaso (yellow card) 34'; Duarte (yellow card) 45'; García (yellow card) 45'; Navarro (yellow card) 45+3'; Rioja (yellow card) 67'; Aguirregabiria (yellow card) 90+2'	Report	Fekir (yellow card) 33'; Canales (yellow card) 45+4'; Emerson 55'; Feddal (red card) 78'; Bartra (yellow card) 90+5'	Stadium: Mendizorrotza Stadium; Attendance: 13,875; Referee: Antonio Mateu Lahoz

18 January 2020 20	Levante	0–1	Alavés	Valencia
13:00 CET (UTC+1)	Melero (yellow card) 42'; Cabaco (yellow card) 87'	Report	Ely (yellow card) 39'; Vidal 64'; Navarro (yellow card) 67'; Duarte (yellow card) 70'; Camarasa (yellow card) 89'	Stadium: Estadi Ciutat de València; Attendance: 16,766; Referee: Guillermo Cuadra Fernández

25 January 2020 21	Alavés	1–2	Villarreal	Vitoria-Gasteiz
18:30 CET (UTC+1)	Ely (yellow card) 45+1'; Joselu 80'; Duarte (yellow card) 82'	Report	Bacca 10'; Quintillà (yellow card) 70'; Niño 89'	Stadium: Mendizorrotza Stadium; Attendance: 18,153; Referee: José Luis Munuera Montero

2 February 2020 22	Sevilla	1–1	Alavés	Seville
18:30 CET (UTC+1)	Reguilón (yellow card) 48'; Ocampos 77' (pen.); Vázquez (yellow card) 81'	Report	Laguardia (yellow card) 64'; Joselu 70'	Stadium: Ramón Sánchez Pizjuán Stadium; Attendance: 36,286; Referee: Carlos del Cerro Grande

7 February 2020 23	Alavés	2–1	Eibar	Vitoria-Gasteiz
21:00 CET (UTC+1)	Vidal (yellow card) 35'; Pérez 46'; Burke 66'; Navarro (yellow card) 74'; García (yellow card) 85'	Report	León (yellow card) 53'; Orellana 83'; Charles (yellow card) 90+1'	Stadium: Mendizorrotza Stadium; Attendance: 17,089; Referee: Eduardo Prieto Iglesias

15 February 2020 24	Mallorca	1–0	Alavés	Palma
13:00 CET (UTC+1)	Hernández 63'	Report	Magallán (yellow card) 40'; Laguardia (yellow card) 71'	Stadium: Son Moix; Attendance: 12,204; Referee: Valentín Pizarro Gómez

23 February 2020 25	Alavés	2–1	Athletic Bilbao	Vitoria-Gasteiz
14:00 CET (UTC+1)	Pérez 28' (pen.); Navarro (yellow card) 31'; Aguirregabiria (yellow card) 33'; Ely (yellow card) 52', (goal) 90+1'; Pons (yellow card) 86'	Report	R. García 17'; Capa (yellow card) 20'; Núñez (yellow card) 26'; D. García (yellow card) 31'; Martínez (yellow card) 31'	Stadium: Mendizorrotza Stadium; Attendance: 19,412; Referee: Antonio Mateu Lahoz

29 February 2020 26	Leganés	1–1	Alavés	Leganés
18:30 CET (UTC+1)	Carrillo 59'; Gil (yellow card) 68'; Awaziem (yellow card) 71'; R. Pérez (yellow card) 90+2'	Report	Duarte (yellow card) 41'; L. Pérez 47'; Fejsa (yellow card) 67'; Vidal (yellow card) 83'	Stadium: Estadio Municipal de Butarque; Attendance: 10,043; Referee: Juan Martínez Munuera

6 March 2020 27	Alavés	1–1	Valencia	Vitoria-Gasteiz
21:00 CET (UTC+1)	Pérez (yellow card) 36'; Navarro (yellow card) 39'; Ely (yellow card) 42'; Joselu (yellow card) 62'; Édgar 73', (yellow card) 84'	Report	Parejo 34'; Kondogbia (yellow card) 35'; Gayà (yellow card) 61'; Diakhaby (yellow card) 90'	Stadium: Mendizorrotza Stadium; Attendance: 14,083; Referee: Jesús Gil Manzano

13 June 2020 28	Espanyol	2–0	Alavés	Cornellà de Llobregat
14:00 CEST (UTC+2)	Embarba (yellow card) 4'; Wu Lei (yellow card) 26', (goal) 47'; Espinosa 45+3'; De Tomás (yellow card) 73'; Calleri (yellow card) 86'	Report	Pacheco (red card) 19'; Laguardia (yellow card) 52'; Rioja (yellow card) 65'; Burke (yellow card) 78'	Stadium: RCDE Stadium; Attendance: 0 Referee: Pablo González Fuertes
Note: The match was originally scheduled for 15 March, but was postponed due to the COVID-19 pandemic, and rescheduled to 13 June. It was played behind closed doors.

18 June 2020 29	Alavés	2–0	Real Sociedad	Vitoria-Gasteiz
19:30 CEST (UTC+2)	Duarte (yellow card) 51'; Sainz 56'; Pina (yellow card) 71' (yellow-red card) 87'; Aguirregabiria 90+6'	Report	Llorente (yellow card) 42'; Elustondo (yellow card) 49'; Zaldúa (yellow card) 54' (yellow-red card) 81'	Stadium: Mendizorrotza Stadium; Attendance: 0 Referee: Santiago Jaime Latre
Note: The match was originally scheduled for 21 March, but was postponed due to the 2020 coronavirus pandemic. and rescheduled to 18 June. It was played behind closed doors.

21 June 2020 30	Celta Vigo	6–0	Alavés	Vigo
14:00 CEST (UTC+2)	Murillo 14'; Yokuşlu (yellow card) 16'; Aspas 20' (pen.); Rafinha 40', 41'; Nolito 78' (pen.); Mina 86'	Report	Pérez (yellow card) 15'; Aguirregabiria (red card) 27'	Stadium: Abanca-Balaídos; Attendance: 0 Referee: Adrián Cordero Vega
Note: The match was originally scheduled for 5 April, but was postponed due to the 2020 coronavirus pandemic, and rescheduled to 21 June. It was played behind closed doors.

24 June 2020 31	Alavés	0–1	Osasuna	Vitoria-Gasteiz
19:30 CEST (UTC+2)	Ely (yellow card) 61'; Édgar (yellow card) 90+6'	Report	Oier (yellow card) 38'; Lato (yellow card) 53', (goal) 64'; D. García (yellow card) 85'	Stadium: Mendizorrotza Stadium; Attendance: 0 Referee: Alejandro Hernández Hernández
Note: The match was originally scheduled for 12 April, but was postponed due to the 2020 coronavirus pandemic, and rescheduled to 24 June. It was played behind closed doors.

27 June 2020 32	Atlético Madrid	2–1	Alavés	Madrid
22:00 CEST (UTC+2)	Partey (yellow card) 40'; Saúl 59'; Costa 73' (pen.); Savić (yellow card) 75'; Koke (yellow card) 90+2'	Report	Pons (yellow card) 45'; Marín (yellow card) 58'; Joselu 90+3' (pen.)	Stadium: Wanda Metropolitano; Attendance: 0 Referee: Mario Melero López
Note: The match was originally scheduled for 22 April, but was postponed due to the 2020 coronavirus pandemic, and rescheduled to 27 June. It was played behind closed doors.

1 July 2020 33	Alavés	0–2	Granada	Vitoria-Gasteiz
19:30 CEST (UTC+2)	Duarte (yellow card) 46'; Aguirregabiria (yellow card) 90+1'; Pons (yellow card) 90+6'	Report	Antoñín 25', (yellow card) 37'; Soldado 49', (yellow card) 62'	Stadium: Mendizorrotza Stadium; Attendance: 0 Referee: Eduardo Prieto Iglesias
Note: The match was originally scheduled for 26 April, but was postponed due to the 2020 coronavirus pandemic, and rescheduled to 1 July. It was played behind closed doors.

4 July 2020 34	Valladolid	1–0	Alavés	Valladolid
19:30 CEST (UTC+2)	Miguel (yellow card) 28'; Joaquín 88'; Plano (yellow card) 90'; Ünal (yellow card) 90+5'	Report	Fejsa (yellow card) 33'; Pina (yellow card) 39'	Stadium: Estadio José Zorrilla; Attendance: 0 Referee: Santiago Jaime Latre
Note: The match was originally scheduled for 3 May, but was postponed due to the 2020 coronavirus pandemic, and rescheduled to 4 July. It was played behind closed doors.

10 July 2020 35	Real Madrid	2–0	Alavés	Madrid
22:00 CEST (UTC+2)	Benzema 11' (pen.); Asensio 50'	Report	Mahmoud (yellow card) 83'	Stadium: Alfredo di Stéfano; Attendance: 0 Referee: Jesús Gil Manzano
Note: The match was originally scheduled for 10 May, but was postponed due to the 2020 coronavirus pandemic, and rescheduled to 10 July. It was played behind closed doors.

13 July 2020 36	Alavés	0–0	Getafe	Vitoria-Gasteiz
19:30 CEST (UTC+2)	Aguirregabiria (yellow card) 21'; García (yellow card) 56'; Laguardia (yellow card) 75'; Ely (yellow card) 82'	Report	Cucurella (yellow card) 12'; Mata (yellow card) 35'	Stadium: Mendizorrotza Stadium; Attendance: 0 Referee: Pablo González Fuertes
Note: The match was originally scheduled for 13 May, but was postponed due to the 2020 coronavirus pandemic, and rescheduled to 13 July. It was played behind closed doors.

16 July 2020 37	Real Betis	1–2	Alavés	Seville
21:00 CEST (UTC+2)	Joaquín (yellow card) 36'; Feddal (yellow card) 75'; Moreno (yellow card) 81'; Rodríguez (yellow card) 87'; Juanmi (yellow card) 90' (yellow-red card) 90'; Loren 90+3'	Report	Joselu (yellow card) 23', (goal) 51'; Tachi (yellow card) 55'; Méndez (yellow card) 62'; Roberto (yellow card) 71'; Ely 76', (red card) 90+5'	Stadium: Estadio Benito Villamarín; Attendance: 0 Referee: David Medié Jiménez
Note: The match was originally scheduled for 17 May, but was postponed due to the 2020 coronavirus pandemic, and rescheduled to 16 July. It was played behind closed doors.

19 July 2020 38	Alavés	0–5	Barcelona	Vitoria-Gasteiz
17:00 CEST (UTC+2)		Report	Fati 24'; Messi 34', 75'; Suárez 44'; Semedo 57'	Stadium: Mendizorrotza Stadium; Attendance: 0 Referee: Juan Martínez Munuera
Note: The match was originally scheduled for 24 May, but was postponed due to the 2020 coronavirus pandemic, and rescheduled to 19 July. It was played behind closed doors.

=== Copa del Rey ===
17 December 2019 First round	Jaén	3–1	Alavés	Jaén
20:00 CET (UTC+1)	Ocaña 14'; Hernández (yellow card) 17', (goal) 90'; Martín (yellow card) 63', (goal) 84'	Report	Guidetti (yellow card) 10'; Laguardia (red card) 52'; Joselu (yellow card) 52'; Wakaso (yellow card) 59'; Pons 86'	Stadium: La Victoria; Attendance: 4,000; Referee: José María Sánchez Martínez

== Statistics ==
=== Appearances and goals ===
Last updated on the end of the season.

No.	Pos	Nat	Player	Total		La Liga		Copa del Rey	
No.	Pos	Nat	Player	Apps	Goals	Apps	Goals	Apps	Goals
Goalkeepers
1	GK	(Spain) ESP	Fernando Pacheco	27	0	27	0	0	0
13	GK	(Spain) ESP	Roberto Jiménez	9	0	8+1	0	0	0
Defenders
3	DF	(Spain) ESP	Rubén Duarte	31	0	30+1	0	0	0
4	DF	(Brazil) BRA	Rodrigo Ely	25	2	24+1	2	0	0
5	DF	(Spain) ESP	Víctor Laguardia	32	1	31	1	1	0
6	DF	(Argentina) ARG	Lisandro Magallán	18	1	13+4	1	1	0
17	DF	(Spain) ESP	Adrián Marín	13	0	9+3	0	1	0
21	DF	(Spain) ESP	Martín Aguirregabiria	32	1	23+8	1	1	0
23	DF	(Spain) ESP	Ximo Navarro	23	0	22+1	0	0	0
27	DF	(Spain) ESP	Tachi	6	0	2+3	0	0+1	0
28	DF	(Spain) ESP	Javi López	1	0	1	0	0	0
36	DF	(Mauritania) MTN	Abdallahi Mahmoud	2	0	1+1	0	0	0
Midfielders
8	MF	(Spain) ESP	Tomás Pina	20	1	17+3	1	0	0
10	MF	(Spain) ESP	Víctor Camarasa	17	0	15+2	0	0	0
11	MF	(Spain) ESP	Luis Rioja	29	0	19+9	0	1	0
15	MF	(Serbia) SRB	Ljubomir Fejsa	13	0	11+2	0	0	0
16	MF	(Spain) ESP	Édgar Méndez	16	1	10+6	1	0	0
18	MF	(Spain) ESP	Aleix Vidal	29	2	26+3	2	0	0
19	MF	(Spain) ESP	Manu García	30	0	22+8	0	0	0
20	MF	(Spain) ESP	Pere Pons	30	2	7+22	1	1	1
24	MF	(Scotland) SCO	Oliver Burke	32	1	14+17	1	0+1	0
29	MF	(Spain) ESP	Borja Sainz	20	1	5+14	1	1	0
38	MF	(Panama) PAN	José Rodríguez	1	0	0+1	0	0	0
Forwards
7	FW	(Spain) ESP	Lucas Pérez	34	11	29+5	11	0	0
9	FW	(Spain) ESP	Joselu	37	11	31+5	11	1	0
32	FW	(Spain) ESP	Paulino	3	0	0+3	0	0	0
Players who have left the club during the season
6	DF	(Chile) CHI	Guillermo Maripán	1	0	1	0	0	0
10	FW	(Sweden) SWE	John Guidetti	6	0	1+4	0	1	0
13	GK	(Spain) ESP	Antonio Sivera	4	0	3	0	1	0
14	MF	(Spain) ESP	Burgui	3	0	0+2	0	0+1	0
15	MF	(Spain) ESP	Javier Muñoz	1	0	1	0	0	0
16	MF	(Colombia) COL	Daniel Torres	0	0	0	0	0	0
22	MF	(Ghana) GHA	Mubarak Wakaso	17	0	15+1	0	1	0
