= Jo Lusi =

Jonathan Kasereka Lusi
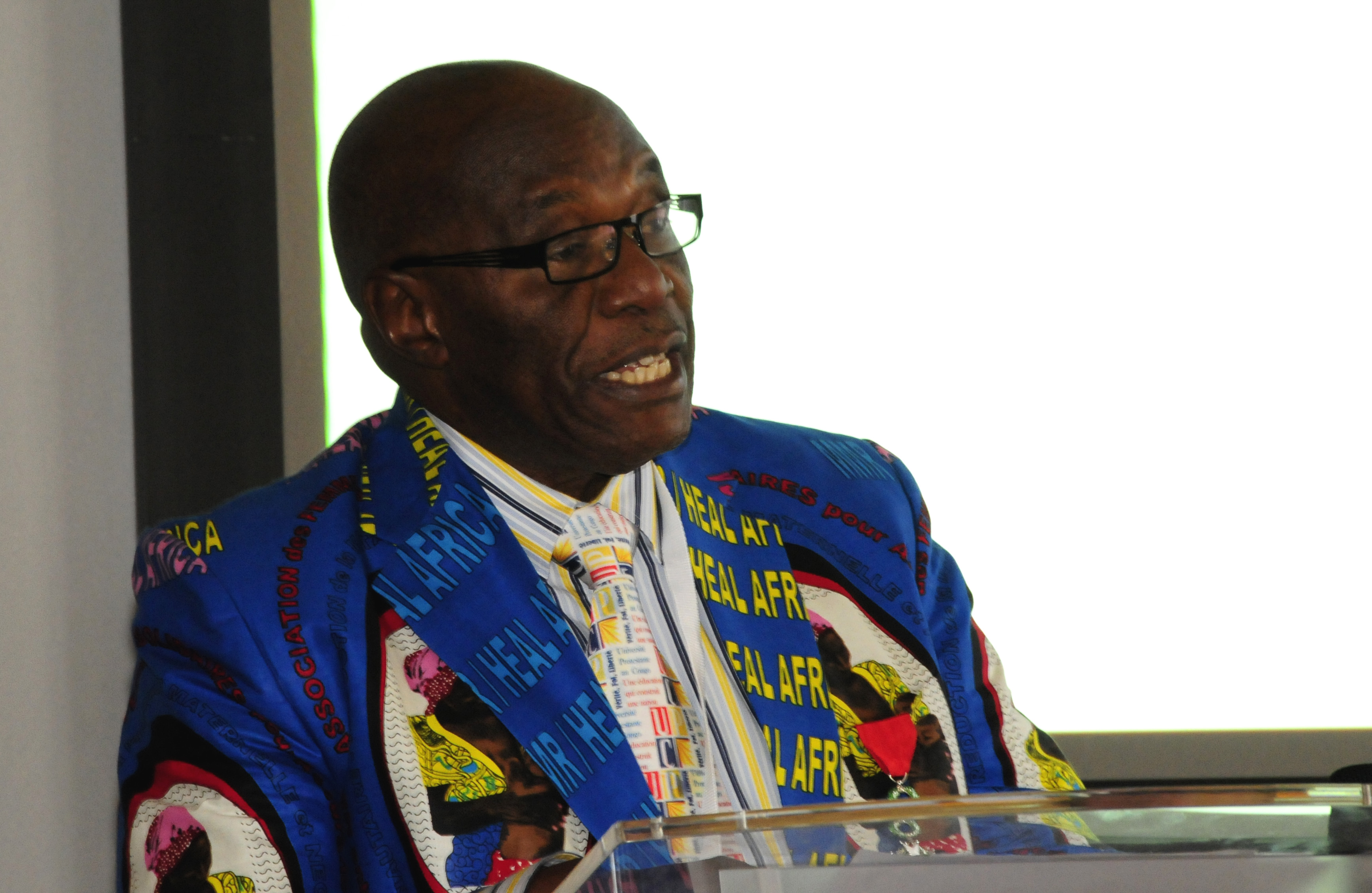
- Born: Kasereka Muhindo Lusi
- Education: University of Kinshasa

Jonathan Kasereka Muhindo "Jo" Lusi is a Congolese orthopedic surgeon and women's rights activist. He is most notable for co-founding (alongside his wife) HEAL Africa Hospital, a teaching hospital and nonprofit organization that specializes in treating women who have been victims of sexual violence.

== Early life and education ==
Kasereka "Jo" Lusi was born in North Kivu, Democratic Republic of the Congo. His father, a surgical nurse, was close friends with English missionary and physician Helen Roseveare. Lusi studied medicine at the University of Kinshasa and did his orthopedics specialization in Belgium. He originally planned to specialize in treating clubfoot, but redirected his focus towards treating victims of violence during the Second Congo War and preceding violence in the 1990s.

== Career ==
After completing his medical education, Lusi joined the Nyankunde Mission Hospital in Eastern Congo, where he worked as a surgeon for nineteen years. In 1993, he joined the Christian non-profit MAP International as the Regional Director of Health Development in Nairobi, Kenya. In 1996, as the sole surgeon in Goma, Lusi treated soldiers from both sides of the First Congo War. When Goma was attacked by the AFDL, he was forced to operate on grenade victims without anesthesia, basic medicine, or basic equipment. On November 8, 1996, while at the border of Rwanda and Zaire (now the DRC), Lusi convinced rebel border guards to allow into Zaire medical supplies from MSF and CBN International. Also in 1996, Lusi and his wife, social activist Lyn Lusi, founded HEAL Africa, a grassroots nonprofit that cares for victims of sexual violence in areas of conflict.

Two years establishing the HEAL Africa hospital, the Central Hospital building was destroyed in the 2002 Mount Nyiragongo volcanic eruption, forcing them to rebuild. At the time of the eruption, Lusi was the only physician in the DRC providing corrective surgery to victims of rape.

Lusi was elected to parliament as a Senator in the transitional government of the Democratic Republic of Congo in 2002. In 2003, the Congolese government proposed a law proposed by Lusi that mandates a 25-year prison sentence for convicted rapists. Also during his time in parliament, he authored Article 15 in the 2005 Congolese Constitution (the current constitution). The Article condemns rape and sexual violence against women and makes it an offense punishable by law as a crime against humanity.

Lusi is featured in the 2007 documentary Lumo, which follows the story of Lumo Sinai, a young woman who was a victim of gang rape and was treated by Lusi.

In 2005, the European Parliament invited Lusi to speak at public hearing on Women and War, held by the Committee on Development and the Committee on Women's Rights and Equality.

In 2013, Lusi travelled to London to address a meeting of delegates from the UN, the Department of International Development, and various NGOs, which sought to further international action to protect women and girls from violence in conflict zones. The UK government pledged £21 million towards the cause.

=== HEAL Africa ===
As it currently operates, HEAL Africa offers medical care, AIDS education, family planning programs, and counseling. Lusi is especially known for his performance of fistula repair surgeries on women who have developed fistulas as a result of sexual trauma. Between the years of 2004 and 2009, over 1,400 successful fistula repairs were performed at HEAL Africa.

The organization has received attention from notable international figures and organizations. In 2009, UN Secretary-General Ban Ki-moon and US Secretary of State Hillary Clinton visited the hospital. British writer and sociologist Elaine Storkey, who met Jo and Lyn Lusi while serving as President of Tearfund, announced in 2023 that she is working on a biography of Lyn Lusi, which will focus in large part on her work with HEAL Africa.

== Personal life ==
In 1974, Jo Lusi married English born social activist Lyn McKenzie, who was working in the DRC as a teacher in schools run by the Baptist Missionary Society. Together, the couple had two children together, a son, Paluku, and a daughter, Nadine. Lyn Lusi died in 2012, at the age of 63, after being diagnosed with terminal cancer. She was buried in Butembo, North Kivu, where Jo Lusi's family is from.

== Selected publications ==
- Malemo. K. L., Lussy, J.P., Kimona, C., Nyavandu, K., Mukekulu, E. K., Lusi, J.K.M., Masumbuko, C.K., Hawkes, M. (2011). Sexual violence toward children and youth in war-torn Eastern Democratic Republic of Congo. PLoS ONE, 6(1). doi:10.1371/journal.pone.0015911
- Lusi, K.M. (1997). The rural practitioner: training and support in Congo-Zaire.
