= ReMastered: Massacre at the Stadium =

2019 documentary film

- Film poster
- Directed by: B.J. Perlmutt; Bent-Jorgen Perlmutt
- Written by: Catalina Ausin; John Meroney; Michael Zimbalist
- Starring: Víctor Jara; Joan Jara; Pascale Bonnefoy
- Distributed by: Netflix
- Release date: January 11, 2019
- Running time: 64 minutes
- Country: United States
- Languages: English, Spanish

ReMastered: Massacre at the Stadium is a 2019 documentary film about the death of singer Victor Jara in 1973, and how it turned him into a symbol of Chile's struggle.

== Premise ==
ReMastered: Massacre at the Stadium examines the 1973 death of Chilean folk singer Victor Jara, and how it made him into a symbol and martyr for Chile's struggle within the Pinochet regime. The film investigates the account of Pedro Barrientos Núñez, a former Chilean army official and suspect in the murder of Jara, and the complex circumstances surrounding it.

== Cast ==
- Víctor Jara
- Joan Jara
- Pascale Bonnefoy
- Joyce Horman
- Salvador Allende
- Jack Devine
- David Frost
- Augusto Pinochet
- U2
