= Lumo (film) =

- Directed by: Bent-Jorgen Perlmutt, Nelson Walker III, Louis Abelman, Lynn True
- Written by: Louis Abelman, Bent-Jorgen Perlmutt, Lynn True, Nelson Walker III
- Produced by: Louis Abelman, Bent-Jorgen Perlmutt, Nelson Walker III
- Cinematography: Nelson Walker III, Bent-Jorgen Perlmutt
- Edited by: Lynn True
- Release date: 2007
- Running time: 72 min.
- Languages: Swahili, French, English

Lumo is a 2007 documentary film about twenty-year-old Lumo Sinai, a woman who fell victim to "Africa's First World War." While returning home one day, Lumo and another woman were gang-raped by a group of soldiers fighting for control of the Democratic Republic of the Congo during the 1994 Rwandan genocide. As a result, Lumo suffered from a traumatic fistula, a chronic condition that leaves her unable to bear children. She undergoes treatment at HEAL Africa, a hospital that specializes in treating victims of sexual violence, and is operated on by orthopedic surgeon and fistula specialist Dr. Jo Lusi. Rejected by her fiancé and most of the village, Lumo examines a woman's tragedy and the process of healing.

Lumo was directed and produced by Bent-Jorgen Perlmutt, Nelson Walker III, Louis Abelman and Lynn True and was aired as part of PBS's Point of View series in 2007.
