= Frédéric Tcheng =

American filmmaker

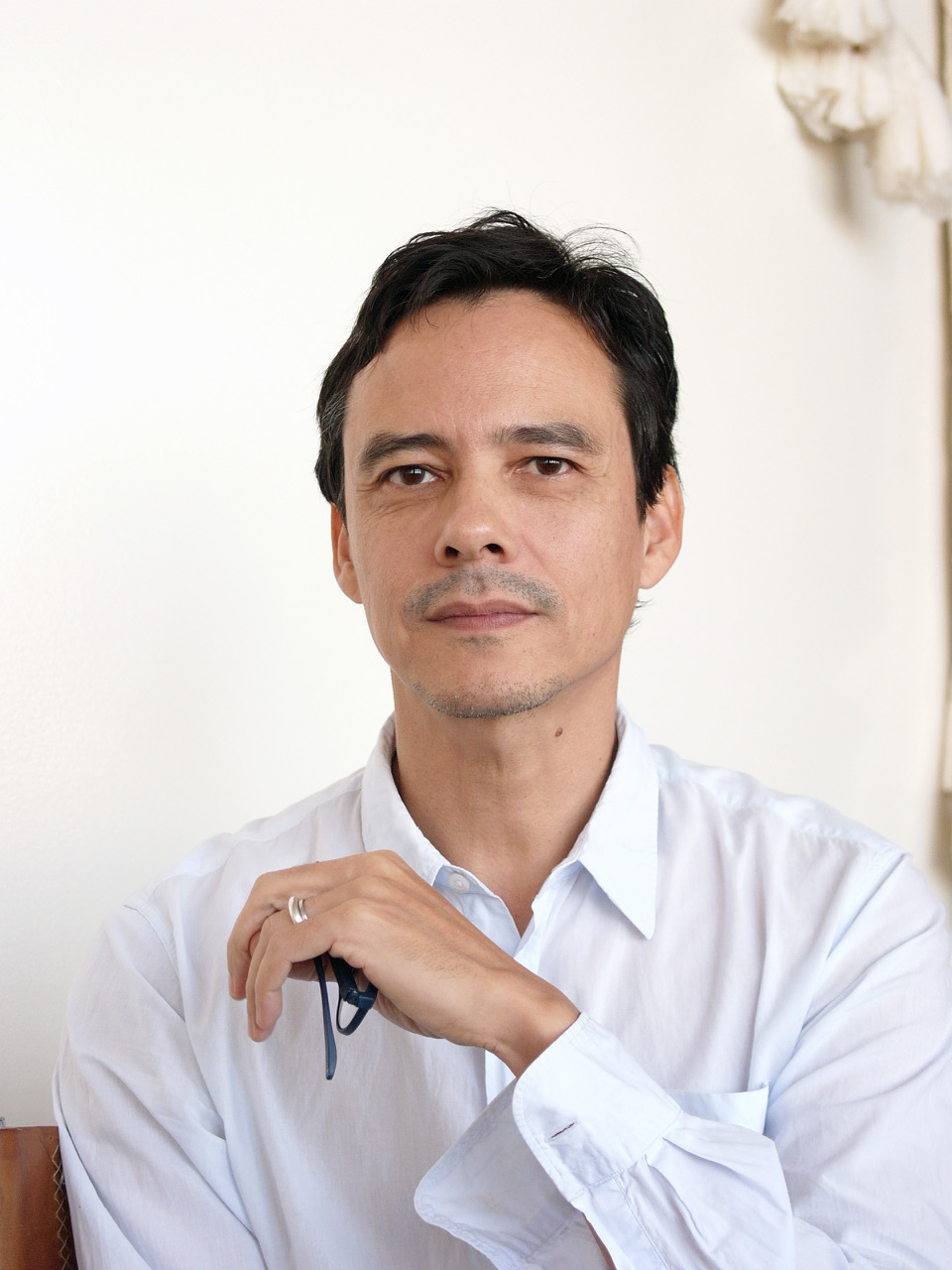
- Born: France
- Education: Columbia University
- Occupation: Filmmaker
- Years active: 2006–present
- Works: Dior and I, Halston

Frédéric Tcheng is a French film director, screenwriter, and cinematographer. He is best known for his documentaries Dior and I, Halston, and Invisible Beauty.

== Life and career ==
Tcheng was born and raised in Lyon, France. After studying engineering in Paris, he moved to New York City where he obtained a Masters of Fine Arts from Columbia University's film school in 2007. His first foray into documentary was the 2008 documentary Valentino: The Last Emperor, which he co-produced and co-edited.

In 2011, he was the writer and co-director of Diana Vreeland: The Eye Has to Travel, which premiered at the Venice International Film Festival.

Tcheng's solo directorial debut, Dior and I, premiered at the 2014 Tribeca Film Festival. The acclaimed documentary focuses on Raf Simons' first haute couture collection for Dior. Also in 2014, he served as a jury member at the Warsaw film festival and CPH:DOX.

From 2018 to 2019, he served as a filmmaking mentor for Queer art, a non-profit arts organization that serves a diverse community of LGBTQ+ artists.

In 2019, he directed the documentary Halston for CNN Films and Amazon. The film reframes the story of the American designer Halston as a business thriller and premiered at Sundance Film Festival.

Tcheng's latest film, Invisible Beauty, about model and activist Bethann Hardison, premiered at the 2023 Sundance Film Festival. Tcheng co-wrote and co-directed the film, along with Hardison.

Tcheng also served as an editor on the second season of the Netflix series Making a Murderer, and a cinematographer on the documentary King Georges.

== Filmography ==
Year	Title	Contribution	Note
2008	Valentino: The Last Emperor	Co-editor and co-producer	Documentary
2011	Diana Vreeland: The Eye Has to Travel	Co-director	Documentary
2014	Dior and I	Director, writer and producer	Documentary
2015	King Georges	Cinematographer	Documentary
2018	Making a Murderer	Editor	3 Episodes
2019	Halston	Director, writer and producer	Documentary
2023	Invisible Beauty	Co-director and editor	Documentary

== Awards and nominations ==
Year	Result	Award	Category	Work	Ref.
2014	Won	Seattle International Film Festival	Documentary Special Jury Award	Dior and I	
2014	Nominated	Tribeca Festival	Best Documentary Feature	Dior and I	
2014	Nominated	Melbourne International Film Festival	Best Documentary	Dior and I	
2014	Nominated	Abu Dhabi Film Festival	Best Documentary Feature	Dior and I	
2019	Nominated	International Documentary Association	Video Source Award	Halston	
2019	Nominated	CPH:DOX	Politiken's Audience Award	Halston	
2019	Nominated	Sarasota Film Festival	Best Documentary Feature	Halston	
