= Halston (film) =

2019 documentary by Frédéric Tcheng

- Theatrical release poster
- Directed by: Frédéric Tcheng
- Written by: Frédéric Tcheng
- Produced by: Roland Ballester; Stephanie Levy; Michael Prall; Frédéric Tcheng; James Paul Dallas
- Starring: Liza Minnelli; Marisa Berenson; Joel Schumacher; Naeem Khan; Pat Cleveland; Karen Bjornson
- Narrated by: Tavi Gevinson; (Chloe)
- Cinematography: Chris W. Johnson
- Edited by: Èlia Gasull Balada; Frédéric Tcheng
- Music by: Stanley Clarke
- Production companies: CNN Films; Dogwoof Pictures; TDog Productions
- Distributed by: 1091 Pictures
- Release date: January 26, 2019 (Sundance)
- Running time: 119 minutes
- Country: United States
- Language: English
- Box office: $188,751

Halston is a 2019 American biographical documentary film written and directed by Frédéric Tcheng and produced by CNN Films and Amazon Originals. The film tells the story of the rise and fall of Roy Halston Frowick, one of America's most prominent fashion designers. The film features commentary by Liza Minnelli, Marisa Berenson, Joel Schumacher, Naeem Khan, Pat Cleveland, Karen Bjornson and other former models known as The Halstonettes. Appearing in archival footage are Halston, Jacqueline Kennedy, Brooke Shields, Andy Warhol and members of his family. The film premiered to generally positive reviews at the Sundance Film Festival on January 26, 2019. It was selected as the spotlight documentary at the Tribeca Film Festival, and had a limited theatrical release in May 2019, before its international release in June.

== Synopsis ==
The film tells the story of Roy Halston Frowick, better known as Halston, and the fashion empire he built in the 70s and lost in the 80s. Framed by the fictional storyline of a researcher digging through archives to understand Halston's downfall, the film begins with his early days working at Bergdorf Goodman as a milliner for society ladies. One of his most notable designs during that period was First Lady Jacqueline Kennedy's iconic pillbox hat for her husband's presidential inauguration in 1961. (Note: Appearing in archival footage, Halston tells the story about how her hat ended up with a dent in the top of it: "It was a really windy day and she put her hand on the hat and it ended up to have a dent in it, so during all the ceremonies it had a dent in the hat, so everybody who copied it put a dent in it, which was so funny".) Halston opened his own fashion house in 1968, and quickly gained popularity for his free-flowing clothes that appealed to a liberated female clientele. A 1973 financial deal with the Norton Simon Inc. conglomerate solidified Halston's place as America's premier designer. It also allowed him to design his first fragrance, which became a runaway hit. Halston himself became a household name - pioneering the idea of fashion as media and of the designer as a star. His empire grew to include dozens of licenses. In the late 70s, he became a regular at Studio 54 and drugs took a toll on his output. As Halston's behavior grew more erratic, he became more and more isolated in his Olympic Tower offices. In the early 80s, in an attempt to “dress America,” Halston announced a partnership with JCPenney. The move, the first such collaboration between a high fashion house and a mass retailer, drew ire in the fashion world, causing Bergorf Goodman to drop Halston from its store. The debacle was compounded by a simultaneous corporate take-over, in which Norton Simon was gobbled by Esmark and then Beatrice - a meatpacker from Chicago.

The film's third act chronicles how Halston - notorious for his lavish lifestyle - was suddenly put under the supervision of executive Carl Epstein whose mission was to cut costs and manage Halston. Within a year, Halston was ousted from his company. Shortly after, he was diagnosed with HIV and died in 1990.

== Cast ==
Appearing as themselves

- Liza Minnelli
- Marisa Berenson
- Joel Schumacher
- Naeem Khan
- Pat Cleveland
- Karen Bjornson
- Alva Chinn
- Nancy North
- Chris Royer
- Bob Colacello
- Lesley Frowick
- Lisa Zay
- Gino Balsamo
- Faye Robson
- Michael Lichtenstein
- Fred Rottman
- Don Friese
- Jeffrey Wirsing
- Patricia Mears
- Fred Dennis

Appearing in archive footage

- Halston
- Elsa Peretti
- Victor Hugo
- Jacqueline Kennedy
- Brooke Shields
- Andy Warhol

== Production notes ==
In an interview given to The Creative Independent in 2019, Tcheng said he became interested in the project when he was approached by the producer, Roland Ballester, to become the director. Ballester told Tcheng that Lesley Frowick, Halston's niece, was going to serve as an executive producer for the documentary. At first glance, he politely declined, not wanting to do another fashion documentary. He did not know that much about Halston and thought of him as an exuberant Studio 54 partygoer. Tcheng conducted additional research and became interested in the designers life. Tcheng accepted the offer to become director of the film after researching how Halston was expelled from his own business in 1983. It resonated with Tcheng because of his own experiences with corporations.

Tcheng reported that the archival footage used in the film was courtesy of Lesley Frowick, who had 215 copies of his private recordings that were presumed to be lost. After she interviewed with the documentary team, and felt confident the film wouldn't portray her uncle in a biased or negative light, she gave them the contact information to Halston's inner circle. Tcheng said none of the models, or even Liza Minnelli, would have talked to them, if it hadn't been for Frowick talking to them first. Tcheng noted that people still protect Halston's reputation.

The project started in April 2017 with intensive research. Tcheng said the documentary team created a catalogue of Halston's life and significant life events. He rated the events on a scale of most important to least important and mapped his life on a big board. He had another board where people were listed he wanted to interview who could give information about specific life events. Since Halston never gave comprehensive interviews, Tcheng said it was difficult to research his early life. Tcheng also stated that there was a lot of gossip surrounding Halston and researchers struggled to identify factual information. It took a year to edit the film because of the large amount of archival footage, interviews, and research into the designer's life and company.

== Release ==
The film premiered at the 2019 Sundance Film Festival on January 26, 2019, and screened as the spotlight documentary at the Tribeca Film Festival. The film had a limited theatrical release on May 24, 2019, and an international release June 7, 2019. The film suffered at the box office, garnering $11,643 for the opening weekend. Total domestic box office sales were $151,991, while international sales were $36,760, resulting in a worldwide total of $188,751. It was released on DVD on August 6, 2019

== Critical reception ==
Vogue said Tcheng "refreshingly avoided" the sensationalism of Halston's reputation for "tantrums and cocaine-fueled excesses", but he also didn't "paint Halston as an angel". They also noted that even though Tcheng admits he is "pro-Halston", the film is fairly balanced, with various perspectives on his life. Rolling Stone magazine said Tcheng makes a "major misstep, in structuring his doc as a film noir", but if the film's framing device is ignored, "Halston emerges as a fascinating study of a fashion artist who allowed women to live an idealized vision of themselves". They concluded that the film captures "the exhilarating thrum...of Halston's ability to create clothes that defined an era and to do it with the kind of startling originality that leaves a lasting impact". The Los Angeles Times said the film places the designer "at the top of fashion’s most influential artists, but it avoids hagiography, showing his ego and addiction". They said the documentary was only an introduction of his life, "but it looks great doing it".

The Guardian complained about the structure of the documentary, saying "this profile has a pretentious – and pointless – framing device in which fashion writer Tavi Gevinson plays a fictional archivist who turns detective to investigate his life". Jeremy Blacklow of GLAAD said, "Tcheng expertly weaves rare archival footage and intimate interviews with Halston’s family, friends, and collaborators...and what results is a behind-the-headlines look into the thrilling struggle between Halston's artistic legacy and the pressures of big business". Tomris Laffly of RogerEbert.com was pleased with the framing device of the film, calling it "compelling", and said the film is "breathtaking for fashion enthusiasts, and anyone dwelling in the tricky intersection of art, history and commerce".

Variety wrote that the film is "thrilling stuff for fashion nerds, as well as a poignant character study of a misfit ultimately undone by an excessive hunger to prove himself". American review aggregator Rotten Tomatoes has the film rated with a score of 77%. The critic consensus reads, "It may not illuminate much of its subject's inner life, but Halston should still prove a comfortable fit for viewers in search of an entertaining fashion documentary."
