= Halston =

American fashion designer (1932–1990)

- Halston by Andy Warhol in 1974
- Born: Roy Halston Frowick; April 23, 1932; Des Moines, Iowa, U.S.
- Died: March 26, 1990 (aged 57); San Francisco, California, U.S.
- Education: Benjamin Bosse High School; School of the Art Institute of Chicago
- Occupations: Fashion designer; milliner
- Labels: Halston Limited; Halston III; Halston IV

Roy Halston Frowick (April 23, 1932 – March 26, 1990), known mononymously as Halston, was an American fashion designer. His minimalist, sleek designs for his Halston brand helped define the look of 1970s American style. Newsweek dubbed him "the premier fashion designer of all America."

In the early 1950s, while studying at the School of the Art Institute of Chicago, Halston launched a small business designing and crafting women's hats. His work quickly attracted a distinguished clientele, leading him to open a boutique on Chicago's Magnificent Mile in 1957. He later moved to New York, where he became head milliner at the luxury department store Bergdorf Goodman. His national profile soared after he created the pillbox hat worn by Jacqueline Kennedy at the presidential inauguration of John F. Kennedy in 1961.

By the late 1960s, Halston shifted his focus to women's fashion, opening a Madison Avenue boutique and establishing a ready-to-wear line that became synonymous with modern American glamour. Halston's designs—often crafted from luxurious fabrics such as cashmere and Ultrasuede—emerged as a defining feature of 1970s fashion, particularly in the era's vibrant discotheques. However, several ill-advised business decisions in the following decade led to his eventual loss of control over the Halston brand. He died in 1990 at age 57 from AIDS-related cancer.

Halston received numerous honors during and after his career, including Coty American Fashion Critics' Awards in 1962, 1969, 1971, 1972, and 1974. In 2000, he was posthumously honored with a plaque on the Fashion Walk of Fame, recognizing his enduring influence on American fashion and design.

== Early life and education ==
Roy Halston Frowick was born on April 23, 1932, in Des Moines, Iowa, the second son of accountant James Edward Frowick who was of Norwegian descent, and his stay-at-home wife Hallie Mae (née Holmes). Halston developed an early interest in sewing from his grandmother and he began creating hats and altering clothes for his mother and sister. He grew up in Des Moines, and moved to Evansville, Indiana, at the age of 14.

After graduating from Benjamin Bosse High School in 1950, Halston briefly attended Indiana University.

== Career ==
=== Millinery career ===
In 1953, Halston opened his own hat business. His first customer was radio actress and comedian Fran Allison. Halston's hats were also bought by Kim Novak, Gloria Swanson, Deborah Kerr, Irene Dunne, and Hedda Hopper.

Halston moved to New York City in late 1957, first working for milliner Lilly Daché. Within a year, he had been named the co-designer at Daché, became acquainted with several fashion editors and publishers, and left Daché's studio to become head milliner for department store Bergdorf Goodman in their customer milliner salon.

Halston achieved widespread recognition after designing the pillbox hat worn by Jacqueline Kennedy to her husband's presidential inauguration in 1961. However, the success was not enough to revive the declining millinery industry, as women increasingly abandoned hats in favor of bouffant hairstyles.

=== Couture and Ready-to-Wear ===
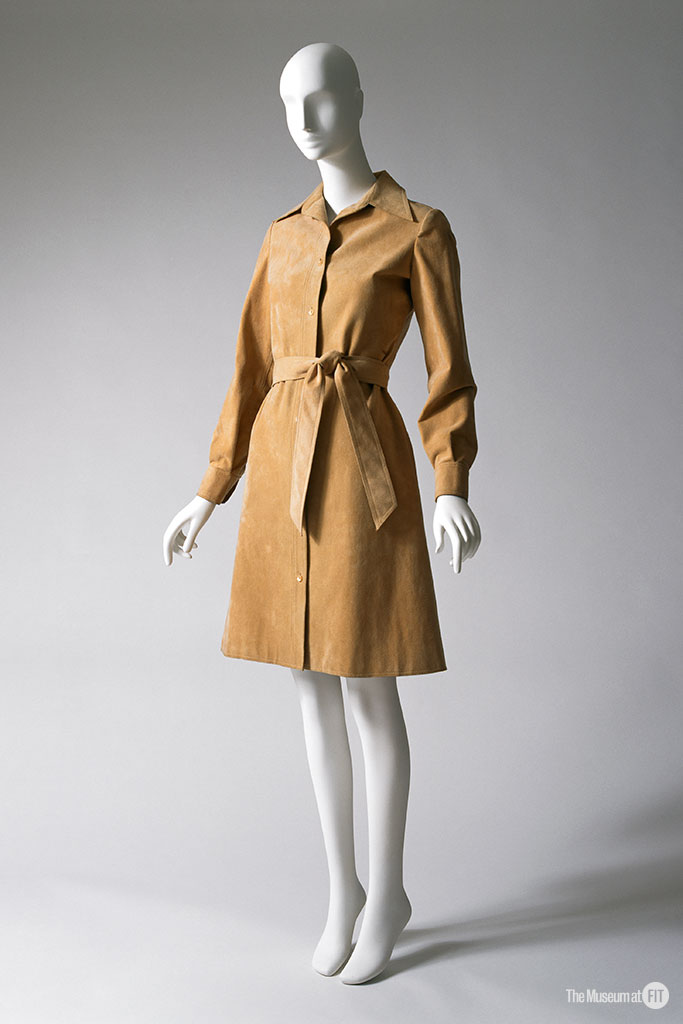
Halston Ultrasuede shirt dress, 1972

When hats fell out of fashion, Halston moved on to designing clothing, made possible by Estelle Marsh, a millionaire from Amarillo, Texas. Marsh was his sole financial backer during this critical time of development. In 1966, Bergdorf Goodman introduced the first clothing collection by Halston, designed to bridge the gap between couture and ready-to-wear fashion.

He opened his first boutique on Madison Avenue in 1968. The collection that year included a dark jade velvet wedding gown for advertising executive Mary Wells Lawrence. Lawrence was married to the CEO of Braniff International Airways, Harding Lawrence. She would be instrumental in bringing Halston to Braniff in 1976 to design Braniff's hostess, pilot, ticket agent, and ground personnel uniforms.

Halston launched his first ready-to-wear line, Halston Limited, in 1969. Halston's design was usually simple, minimalist yet sophisticated, glamorous and comfortable at the same time. He liked to use soft, luxurious fabric like silk and chiffon. Halston's boutique drew celebrity clients like Greta Garbo, Babe Paley, Anjelica Huston, Gene Tierney, Lauren Bacall, Elizabeth Taylor, Bianca Jagger and Liza Minnelli. In 1970, Hope Portocarrero, first lady of Nicaragua and client, issued a postage stamp dedicated to Halston. From 1968 to 1973, his line earned an estimated $30 million.

His first major success was the shirtdress made from Ultrasuede, an imitation leather material manufactured in Japan that Halston referred to as "leatherette." He promoted the garment's practicality by noting that it was machine washable. Approximately 50,000 shirtwaist dresses were sold, and Ultrasuede became a fashion staple for many years.

Halston was also credited with popularizing caftans, matte jersey halter-top dresses, and polyurethane in American fashion. His T-shirt silk-jersey caftan became a bestseller, with its wide sleeves particularly sought after by Babe Paley, who ordered it in 10 colors, while Jacqueline Kennedy Onassis and Betsey Cushing Whitney each ordered four in 1972.

In August 1972, Halston received unprecedented media attention for a fashion designer when Newsweek published a nine-page feature on him, including four pages of color photographs, and described him as "the premier fashion designer of all America." Later that year, for his Coty American Fashion Critics' Awards presentation, Halston collaborated with Pop artist Andy Warhol, who incorporated his "Superstars" into the production.

In 1973, Halston sold his line to Norton Simon, Inc. for $16 million but remained its principal designer. This afforded him creative control with near unlimited financial backing. Later in the same year, he participated in the historic Battle of Versailles Fashion Show to benefit the restoration of the Palace of Versailles.

Every season, Halston included hand-painted chiffon and sequins. For his fall 1974 collection, he adapted works by artists Frank Stella, Jackson Pollock, and Andy Warhol onto chiffon and matte jersey dresses.

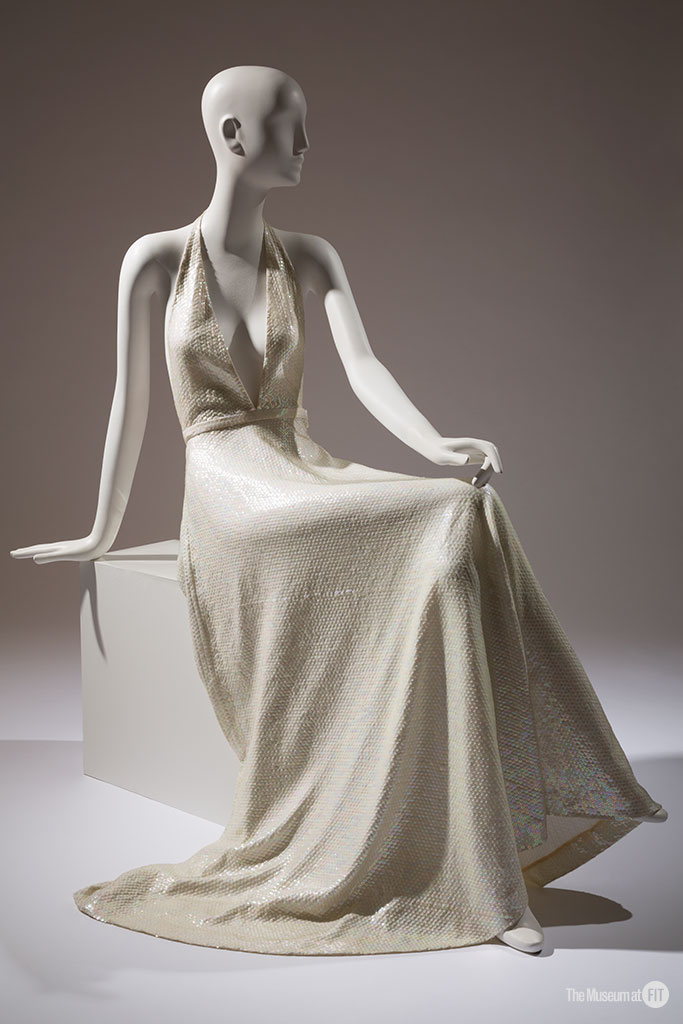
Halston sequined polyester evening dress, 1974

In 1975, Halston incorporated accessories designer Bobby Breslau's oversized leather pouch bags into one of his collections. Available in a variety of colors and sizes, the accessories became widely known as the "Halston bag." Their youthful, playful style complemented Halston's minimalist designs, attracting considerable attention and selling prominently at his Madison Avenue boutique.

=== Halstonettes ===
As Halston's popularity and fame grew, those he worked with also became well known. His favored models included Pat Cleveland, Anjelica Huston, Heidi Goldberg, Karen Bjornson, Beverly Johnson, Nancy North, Chris Royer, Alva Chinn, Connie Cook, and Pat Ast. This entourage of models was eventually dubbed "The Halstonettes" by fashion journalist André Leon Talley. The Halstonettes appeared together in editorials and ads for Halston clothing and cosmetics and appeared at many Halston-related events. The troupe often travelled with Halston, attended his galas, acted as his muses, and reflected ethnic diversity. Halston was one of the first major designers to hire models of different races to walk in his shows and appear in his ads.

=== Uniforms ===
Halston was very influential in the design of uniforms. He was asked by the U.S. Olympic Committee to design the Pan American Games and U.S. Olympic Team's uniforms in 1976. He also designed the uniforms for the Girl Scouts, the New York Police Department, and the Avis Rent a Car System.

In 1977, Halston was commissioned by Braniff International Airways to redesign its flight attendant uniforms as part of the airline's "Ultra Touch" campaign. He created interchangeable separates in muted shades of brown, tan, and taupe accented with a distinctive "H" logo, while the airline extended the color scheme to aircraft interiors. The new designs were unveiled at the lavish "Three Nights in Acapulco" event and were praised by both the fashion press and Braniff employees for their elegance and comfort.

=== Expansion and theatrical designs ===
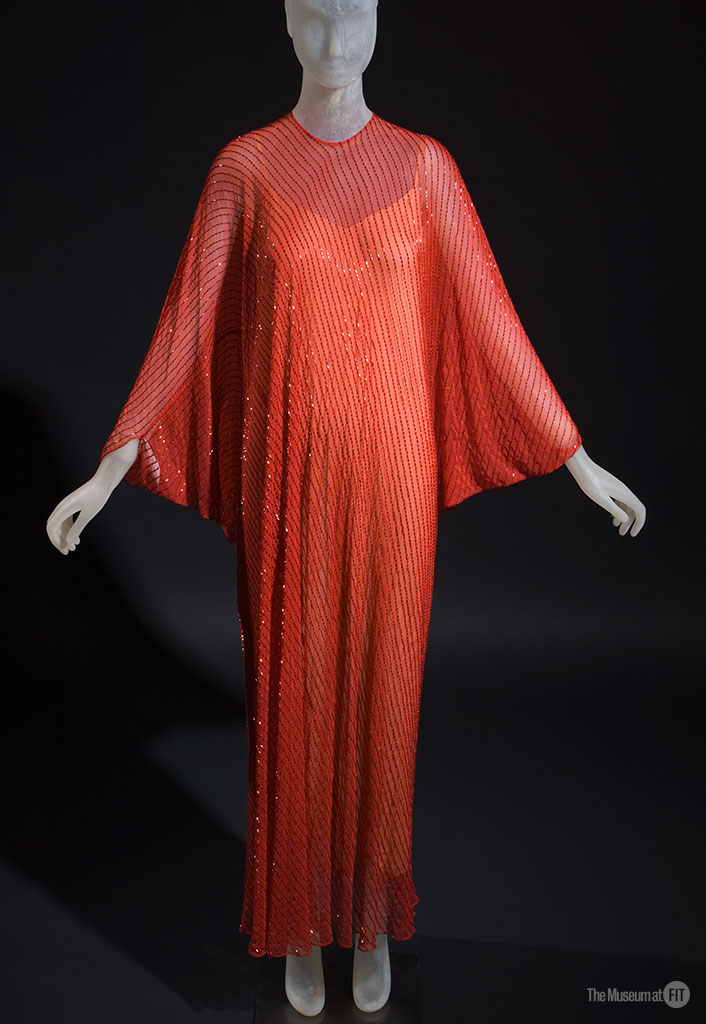
Halston beaded nylon evening caftan, 1977

Halston broadened his business empire during the 1970s, extending his name into products such as furs, luggage, cosmetics, perfume, bedding, rainwear, carpets, and handbags, with more than 30 fashion-related lines in production by the decade's end. Every venture associated with him proved successful, including the jewelry designs of Elsa Peretti, which were frequently shown alongside his clothing collections. Peretti also helped design bottles for Halston fragrances.

In 1975, Max Factor released Halston's first namesake fragrance for women Halston Classic by perfumer Bernard Chant. By 1977, sales from the perfume had generated $85 million.

Halston later moved into theatrical design, creating costumes for Liza Minnelli's Broadway show The Act in 1977, as well as costumes for several ballets by Martha Graham, including Clytemnestra in 1978.

In March 1977, Halston hosted a benefit for the Martha Graham Dance Company at Bergdorf Goodman in New York.

In 1978, Halston relocated his headquarters to the top of the Olympic Tower at 641 Fifth Avenue in Manhattan. With 18-foot-high ceilings and fully glazed exterior walls, the showroom offered sweeping views of the city that were amplified by mirrored interior partitions. Seats at Halston's fashion shows were highly coveted, with the front row consistently filled by his famous circle, including Lee Radziwill, Martha Graham, Liza Minnelli, Elizabeth Taylor, Diana Vreeland, and Andy Warhol, and Steve Rubell.

In 1983, Halston signed a six-year licensing deal worth a reported $1 billion with retail chain J. C. Penney. The line, called Halston III, consisted of affordable clothing, accessories, cosmetics and perfumes ranging from $24 to $200. At the time, the move was considered controversial, as no other high-end designer had ever licensed their designs to a mid-priced chain retail store. While Halston was excited about the deal and felt that it would only expand his brand, the deal damaged his image with high-end fashion retailers who felt that his name had been "cheapened". Bergdorf Goodman at the time dropped his Halston Limited line from their store shortly after plans for Halston III were announced.

=== Loss of control and later years ===
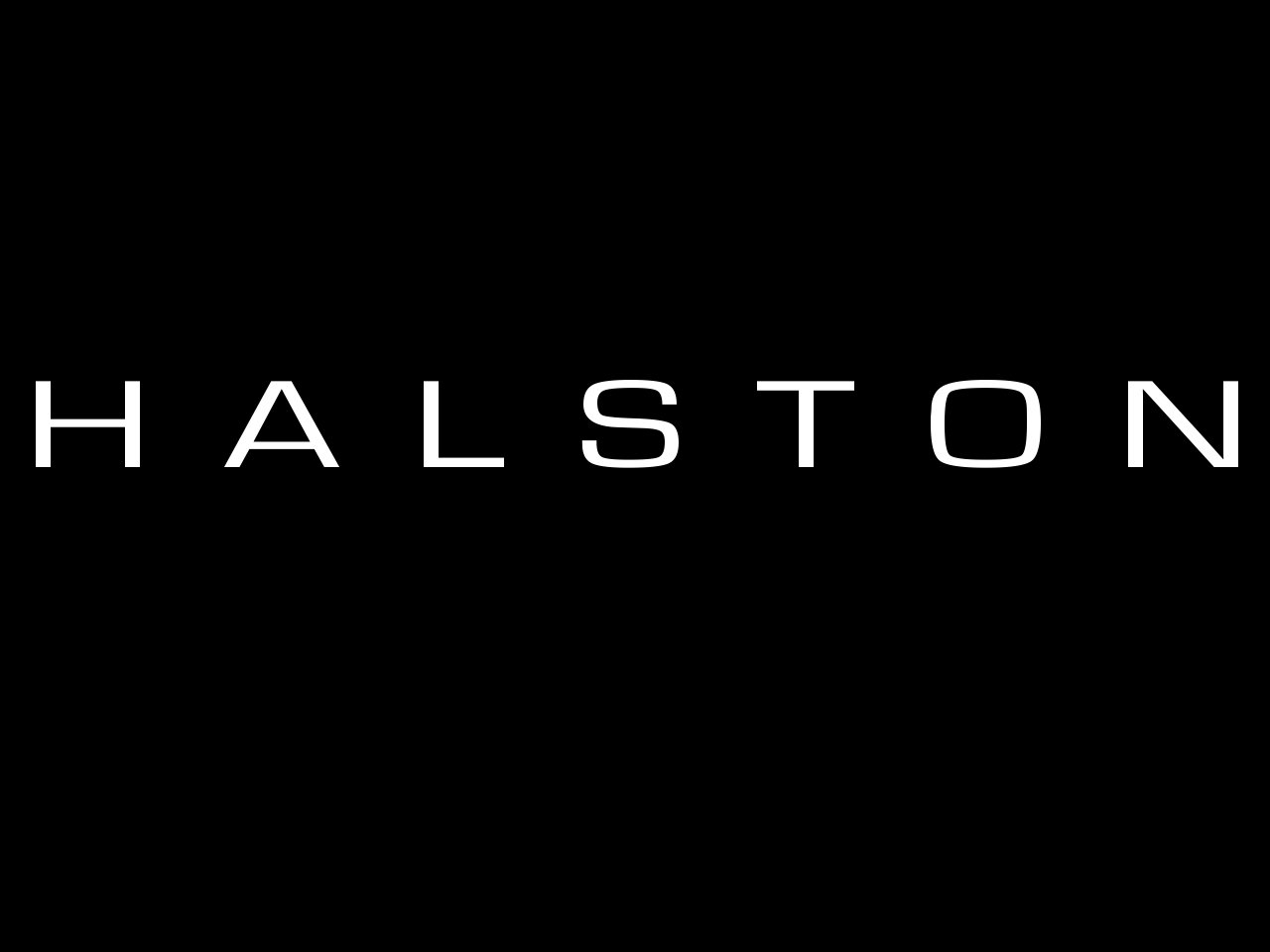
The logo of his eponymous fashion label

In 1983, Halston Limited, which was owned by Norton Simon, Inc., was acquired by Esmark Inc. After the acquisition, Halston began to lose control over his namesake company and grew frustrated. As the label changed hands (it would be owned by Playtex International, Beatrice Foods and four other companies), Halston continued to lose control and, by 1984, was banned from creating designs for Halston Enterprises, being replaced in that role by John David Ridge. Ridge, who was his assistant, recounted to biographer Steven Gaines:

His hands would shake so much that he would have to point while I cut the fabric. Sometimes though, late at night, I'd see a little bit of brilliance come out. His ideas were brilliant. Sometimes he would be draping things and it would be wonderful.

Halston attempted to buy back his company through protracted negotiations, but was unsuccessful. Halston Enterprises was eventually acquired by Revlon in 1986.

He continued designing for family and friends, most notably Liza Minnelli and Martha Graham. In 1986, Halston designed the costumes for the Martha Graham Dance Company's Temptations of the Moon. After his contract with Revlon expired, he was in talks to sign a new contract with the company but stopped negotiations after he learned that Revlon planned to continue the line without his input. The line continued on with various designers until 1990, when Revlon discontinued the clothing portion of the line but continued selling Halston perfumes.

== Death ==
In 1988, Halston tested positive for HIV. After his health began to fail, he moved to San Francisco, where he was cared for by his family. On March 26, 1990, he died of Kaposi's sarcoma, an AIDS-defining illness, at the California Pacific Medical Center in San Francisco. His remains were cremated.

Following Halston's death, an invitation-only memorial service was held at Lincoln Center's Alice Tully Hall in New York City, organized by Liza Minnelli and Hillie Mahoney. Attendees included figures from fashion, entertainment, and the arts such as Calvin Klein, Oscar de la Renta, Martha Graham, and Danny Aiello. Guests viewed film clips from Halston's life and heard tributes from friends and colleagues, including Elsa Peretti and Marisa Berenson. Minnelli recalled the last time she saw him in the hospital, saying, "He loved life—and laughter."

== Personal life ==
In 1974, Halston purchased a townhouse at 101 East 63rd Street on the Upper East Side of Manhattan, where he became known for hosting glamorous parties attended by figures such as Andy Warhol, Bianca Jagger, Liza Minnelli, and Elizabeth Taylor. During the summer, he rented the main house at Warhol's Montauk estate, Eothen, in Montauk, New York. In a 1976 interview, Halston said, "I have a lot of very good friends on a lot of levels. Normally I'm in New York because of my work and because I love New York. I might go sailing in the winter or go to one of the beaches in the summer. I have a very pretty house in New York that is very modern and I entertain there a lot. I have a lot of small dinner parties at home."

After Studio 54 opened in 1977, Halston became one of the nightclub's most recognizable regulars and was often photographed there with Minnelli, Jagger, Warhol, and Studio 54 co-owner Steve Rubell.

=== Relationships ===
Halston was openly gay, and most notably, he dated Venezuelan-born artist Victor Hugo. Their on-and-off relationship lasted a little over ten years. The two first met in 1972, reportedly when Hugo answered an escort service request from Halston—a meeting that evolved from a transactional encounter into a romantic relationship. Soon after, Hugo moved into Halston's Manhattan home and was placed on the payroll at his company. Halston assigned Hugo to design the window displays for his Madison Avenue boutique—a position that previously belonged to his former associate. During their years together, Halston and Hugo became fixtures of New York nightlife, especially at Studio 54. Their lifestyle has been described as hedonistic—marked by frequent partying and recreational drug use.

According to The New York Times, Halston was known to have had an affair with fashion designer Luis Estevez.

== Design style and influence ==
Halston became known for a minimalist approach to American luxury and for his chiffon caftans, particularly his distinctive tie-dyed designs. Halston's caftans originated as a practical solution to a design problem: while experimenting with tie-dyed fabrics, he wanted to preserve the material's patterns without cutting the fabric into multiple pieces. The loose, flowing silhouette allowed him to use the fabric largely intact while eliminating the need for fitting and alterations. "It made young people feel young and old people feel young.," Halston said. The caftans became popular for their patterns and individuality, as no two tie-dyed designs were exactly alike. Halston later expanded the technique to include wax-resist patterns inspired by batik, hand-painted designs, solid colors, and fabrics including cashmere, silk, and cut velvet.

Halston was also widely associated with the glamour of the 1970s disco era. His garments frequently used monochromatic palettes, draped construction, bias cuts, and fabrics such as jersey, chiffon, and Ultrasuede. Halston later told Vogue that he got rid of "...all of the extra details that didn't work—bows that didn't tie, buttons that didn't button, zippers that didn't zip, wrap dresses that didn't wrap. I've always hated things that don't work." Halston changed the fitted silhouette and showed the female body shape by allowing the natural flow of the fabric to create its own shape. Halston said "Pants give women the freedom to move around they've never had before. They don't have to worry about getting into low furniture or low sportscars. Pants will be with us for many years to come—probably forever if you can make that statement in fashion."

Halston is credited with helping establish an American approach to luxury sportswear and eveningwear distinct from European haute couture traditions. His fashion house also popularized the concept of lifestyle branding in American fashion through extensive licensing and cross-category merchandising. Halston's business model later influenced designers such as Calvin Klein, Ralph Lauren, and Michael Kors.

According to fashion critic Robin Givhan, when Tom Ford relaunched Gucci and Yves Saint Laurent in the late 1990s, he found his inspiration in the glittering glamour of Halston's style: "When Ford added Yves Saint Laurent to his workload in 1999, he did due diligence in researching the house's history. But his work continued to display a louche attitude that recalled the best of Halston."

== Accolades and legacy ==
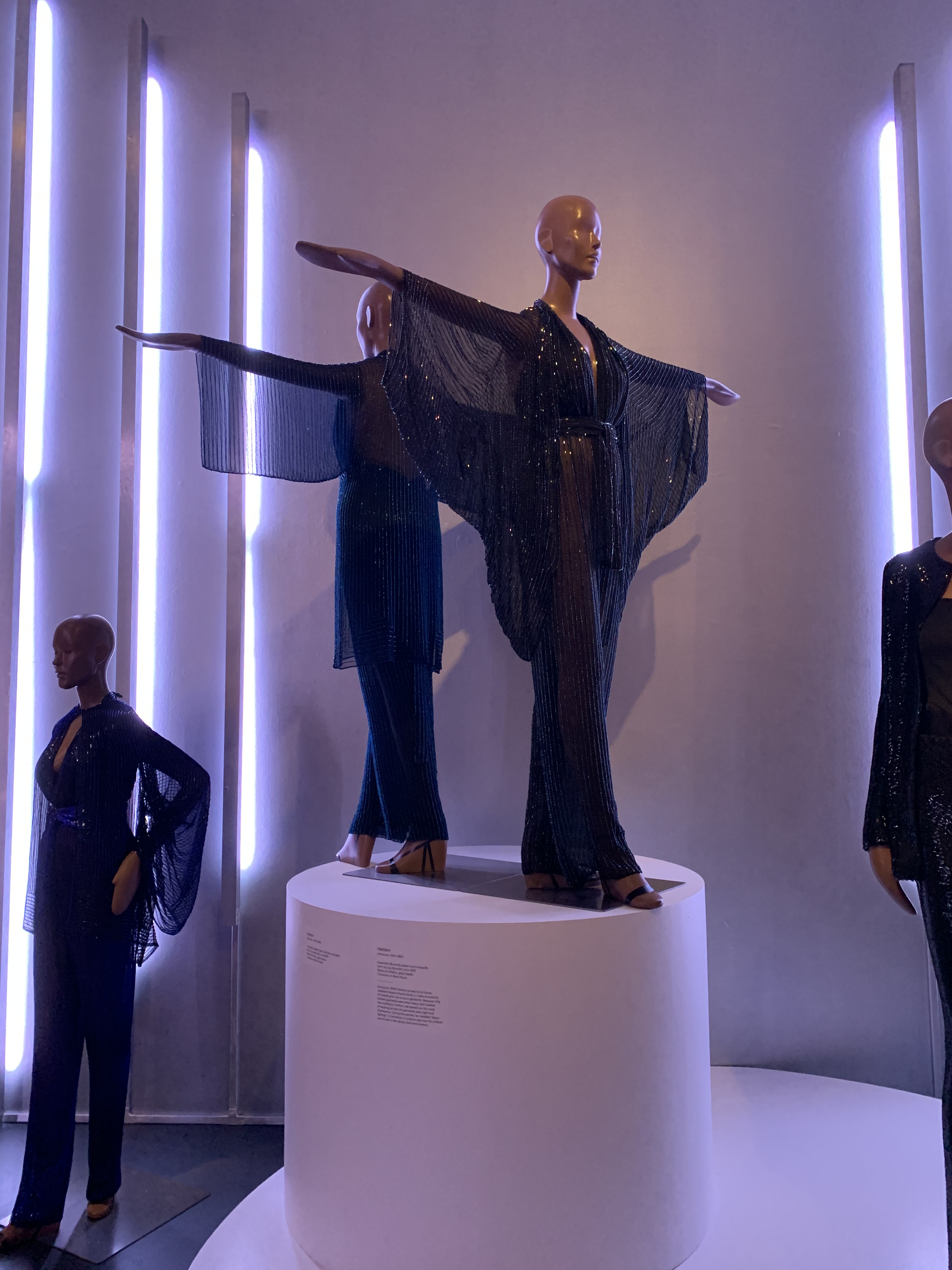
Liza Minnelli's Halstons from the Mark Payne collection at Brooklyn Museum, 2020

Halston's work earned widespread critical acclaim throughout his career, including multiple Coty American Fashion Critics' Awards in 1962, 1969, 1971, 1972, and 1974. His repeated recognition reflected his lasting influence on American fashion.

In 1991, the exhibition Halston: Absolute Modernism at the Fashion Institute of Technology in New York City examined Halston's legacy through his minimalist approach to design, emphasizing his use of simplified construction, geometric form, and fluid movement, and drawing parallels between his work and modernist art.

In 2000, Halston was among the inaugural group of designers honored with a plaque on the Fashion Walk of Fame in New York City.

In 1999, Elaine Gross and Fred Rottman published Halston: An American Original, a book examining Halston's life, career, and influence on American fashion.

From November 2014 to January 2015, a traveling exhibition entitled Halston and Warhol Silver and Suede was sponsored by the Warhol Museum and co-curated by Halston's niece Lesley Frowick.

From February to April 2015, an exhibition was held in the museum of the Fashion Institute of Technology in New York City to celebrate Halston's 1970s fashions.

In March 2017, Halston Style, a retrospective of his career, opened at the Nassau County Museum of Art. The retrospective was curated by Halston's niece Lesley Frowick and features material derived from his personal archives that he gave to her before his death. Frowick also authored the accompanying catalogue, Halston: Inventing American Fashion.

=== In pop culture ===
In 2010, Halston was the subject of the documentary Ultrasuede: In Search of Halston.

In May 2019, the documentary Halston, directed by Frédéric Tcheng was released. The documentary revived interest in Halston and The Halstonettes. In May 2019, The New York Times released an article, "Halston's Women Have Their Say" which outlined many of the Halstonette women reflecting on their experience. A similar article was published in August 2019, by CNN titled, "Free Inside Our Clothes: Top Models Remember What It Was Like to Walk a Halston Show".

Ewan McGregor portrayed the designer in the television miniseries Halston, which premiered May 14, 2021 on Netflix, adapted from the 1991 biography Simply Halston by Steven Gaines.
