= Bent-Jorgen Perlmutt =

American documentary film director, writer and producer)

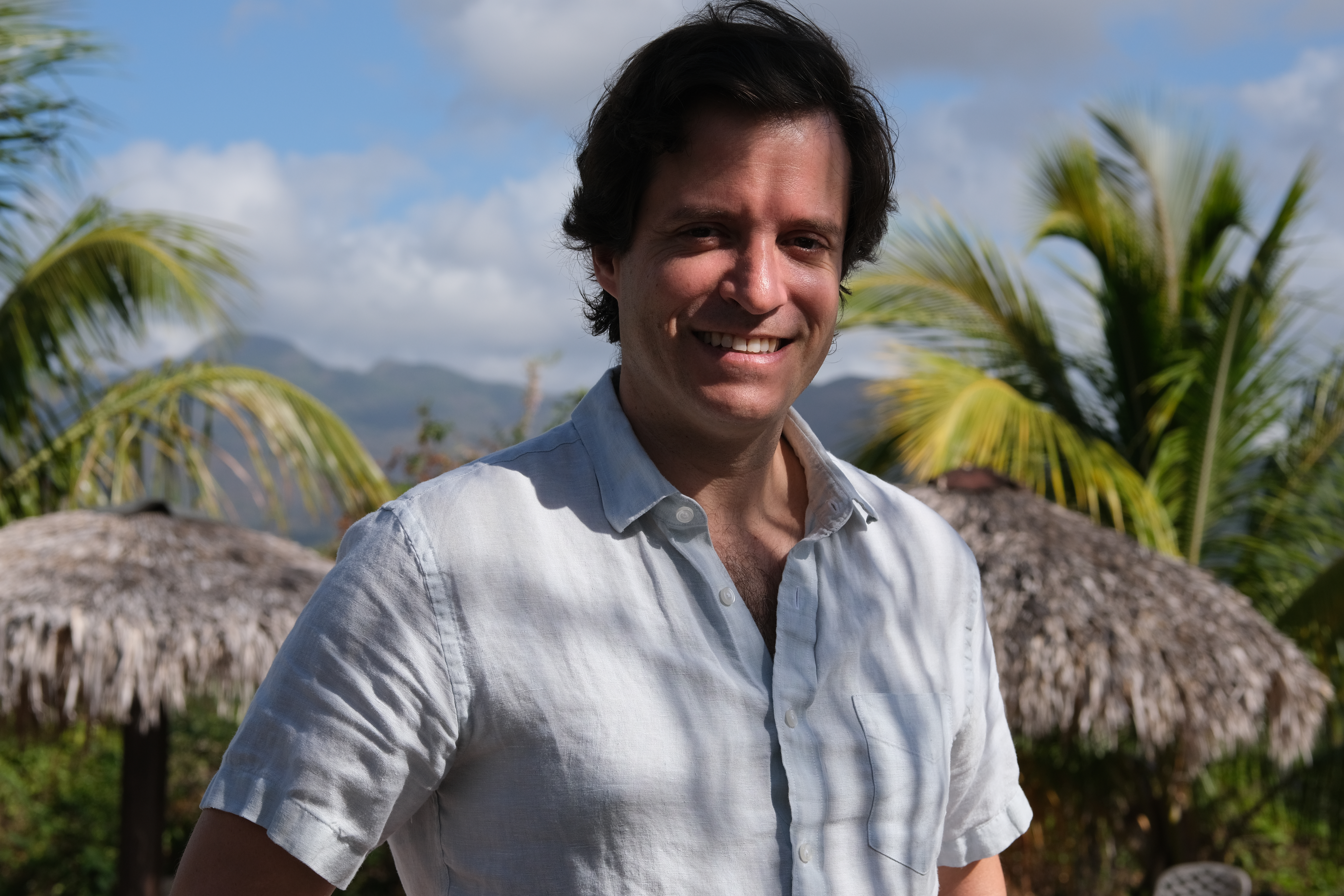
- Born: New York City, New York, U.S.
- Occupations: Director; writer; producer; Professor
- Years active: 2004–present
- Partner: Sarah Canner

Bent-Jorgen Perlmutt is an American director, writer, producer, and film professor at Princeton University. He is best known for his documentary films ReMastered: Massacre at the Stadium, Havana Motor Club, Diana Vreeland: The Eye Has to Travel, and Lumo.

== Life and career ==
Perlmutt was born in New York City, NY and grew up in Chapel Hill, NC. He holds a B.A. with honors from Brown University in 2001 and an M.F.A. with honors from Columbia University in 2007. In 2007, he won a Student Academy Award for his documentary Lumo. In 2008, he won Focus Features' Best Director Award at the Columbia University Film Festival for his narrative short Les Vulnerables and was named one of Filmmaker Magazine's "25 New Faces of Indie Film". His most recent film, ReMastered: Massacre at the Stadium, was nominated for an Emmy Award in 2020.

Perlmutt is a member of the Directors Guild of America (DGA), the National Board of Review (NBR), and has received multiple film grants from the Sundance Institute for his narrative projects. He has taught filmmaking at Columbia University and William Paterson University, and currently teaches at Princeton University.

== Filmography ==
Year	Title	Contribution	Note
2019	ReMastered: Massacre at the Stadium	Director	Documentary
2019	Nightbirds	Director, writer, editor, and producer	Documentary short
2018	Invisible Killers: Ebola	Director and producer	1 episode
2016	Puppy Love	Director, writer, and editor	Short film
2015	Havana Motor Club	Director, writer, editor, and producer	Documentary
2011	Diana Vreeland: The Eye Has to Travel	Director, writer, and editor	Documentary
2010	National Geographic Explorer: Man vs Volcano	Field Producer and editor	1 episode
2008	Valentino: The Last Emperor	Associate editor	Documentary
2007	Lumo	Director, writer, cinematographer, and producer	Documentary
2007	Les Vulnérables	Director, writer, editor, and producer	Short film
2004	Control Room	Co-Producer and additional editor	Documentary

=== As actor ===
- 2004 : Brother to Brother

== Awards and nominations ==
Year	Result	Award	Category	Work	Ref.
2020	Nominated	News & Documentary Emmy Awards	Outstanding Historical Documentary	ReMastered: Massacre at the Stadium	
2015	Nominated	Tribeca Film Festival	Best Documentary Feature	Havana Motor Club	
2007	Won	Student Academy Awards	Documentary	Lumo	
