= Sant Martí Vell =

- Municipality
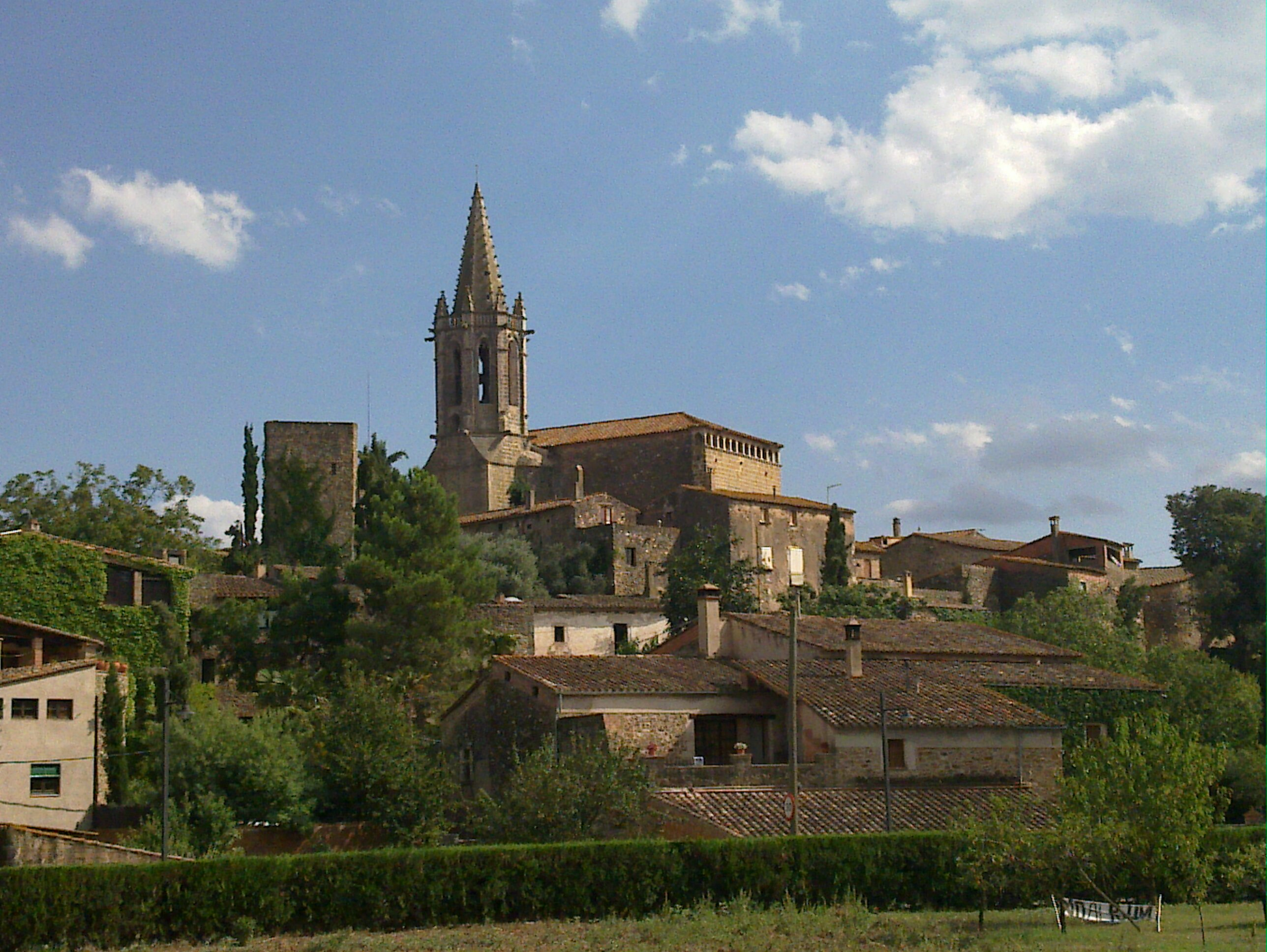
- Parish church

- Flag Coat of arms

- Location in Catalonia Sant Martí Vell (Spain)
- Coordinates: 42°1′19″N 2°55′54″E
- Country: Spain
- Community: Catalonia
- Province: Girona
- Comarca: Gironès

Government
  - Mayor: Robert Vilà Brugués (2015)

Area
  - Total: 17.5 km^{2} (6.8 sq mi)

Population (2025-01-01)
  - Total: 271
  - Density: 15.5/km^{2} (40.1/sq mi)
- Website: www.santmartivell.cat

Sant Martí Vell (Catalan pronunciation: [ˈsam məɾˈti ˈβeʎ]) is a village in the province of Girona and autonomous community of Catalonia, Spain. The municipality covers an area of 17.48 square kilometres (6.75 sq mi) and the population in 2014 was 242.

== Notable people ==
- Elsa Peretti (1940–2021), fashion designer; lived in the village from 1968 until her death. She contributed to many projects in the village, including rebuilding, renovation of the local church, excavation of a Roman site, and the establishment of a vineyard.
