= Karen Bjornson =

American model

- Born: 1952 (age 73–74); Galesburg, Illinois, US
- Occupation: Model
- Known for: One of Halston's Halstonettes
- Spouse: Timothy Macdonald
- Children: 2

Karen Bjornson (born 1952) is an American model. She is best known as one of Halston's Halstonettes. In 2019, she was one of many of his former models to be interviewed for the documentary film Halston.

Bjornson was born in Galesburg, Illinois, in 1952. She later moved with her family to Cincinnati.

Bjornson moved to New York, and a month later met Halston, who hired her immediately. She went on to appear on the cover of Newsweek and Cosmopolitan.

Bjornson retired in the early 1980s to start a family, and returned to modelling in the early 2000s at the age of 50.

She is married to interior designer Timothy Macdonald. They have two daughters, and have lived in Darien, Connecticut, since 1989.
