= Newsweek gay actor controversy =

Media reaction

The Newsweek gay actor controversy refers to the reaction to an article published in 2010 by Newsweek magazine, written by Ramin Setoodeh. In the piece, titled "Straight Jacket", he asserted that openly gay actors are not capable of convincingly playing straight characters. Setoodeh's article provoked strong reactions from both within and outside the entertainment industry.

== Straight Jacket ==
In a Newsweek article titled "Straight Jacket" dated April 26, 2010, journalist Ramin Setoodeh reviewed the Broadway revival of Promises, Promises starring Sean Hayes as the male lead. Hayes had recently come out as gay in an interview with the LGBT-interest The Advocate magazine. Setoodeh found Hayes's performance "wooden and insincere, like he's trying to hide something, which of course he is". Setoodeh also challenged the acting ability of openly gay actor Jonathan Groff, who had then recently joined the cast of the TV show Glee. While recognizing Groff as "a knockout singer and a heartthrob" for his Broadway performance in Spring Awakening, Setoodeh found that Groff's television performance was "off" and distracting.

From these two performances, along with how Setoodeh's perceptions of the performances of actors Rock Hudson, Tab Hunter, Van Johnson and Anthony Perkins—closeted or semi-closeted during their careers but now known to have been gay—changed with his knowledge of the actors' homosexuality, Setoodeh concluded that once the public learns that an actor is gay, the actor can no longer convincingly play straight characters. Setoodeh acknowledged the ability of actors Neil Patrick Harris and Portia de Rossi to play straight characters on television (on How I Met Your Mother and Better Off Ted respectively), but dismissed these examples with the claim that they are playing "caricatures, not realistic characters".

== Backlash ==
The day after the Newsweek article appeared online, LGBT media website AfterElton.com denounced Setoodeh and his conclusions. Editor Michael Jensen noted previous articles by Setoodeh in which he claimed that effeminate characters on television were harmful to the gay movement and seemed to suggest that openly gay teenage murder victim Lawrence King was partially to blame for his own murder because of his effeminate self-expression. He pondered whether Setoodeh's opinion on openly gay actors was rooted in some issue of Setoodeh's own with effeminate men. Jensen questioned what Setoodeh, himself openly gay, hoped to accomplish with the article and asserted that by writing it, Setoodeh was only making it harder for gay actors to make the decision to come out.

Actress Kristin Chenoweth, Hayes's co-star in Promises, Promises, rose to Hayes's defense. Posting to Newsweek.com, Chenoweth noted that Hayes was nominated for Drama League, Outer Critics Circle and Tony Awards and that "thousands of people have traveled from all over the world to enjoy Hayes' performance and don't seem to have one single issue with his sexuality". She accused Setoodeh of engaging in selection bias through his choices of actors upon whom he focused the article and found the entire piece "horrendously homophobic".

Following Chenoweth's response, Glee creator Ryan Murphy called for a boycott of Newsweek, writing in an open letter, "This article is as misguided as it is shocking and hurtful. ... I extend an open invitation to Mr. Setoodeh to come to the writers room of our show, and perhaps pay a set visit. ... Hopefully, some of the love we attempt to spread will rub off on Mr. Setoodeh — a gay man deeply in need of some education — and he not only apologizes to those he has deeply offended but pauses before he picks up his poison pen again to work through the issues of his own self loathing." In a second open letter, Murphy announced that Setoodeh had accepted his invitation and would meet with Glee's writers and observe casting sessions. "I hope observing this process firsthand — and talking with our cast — will be illuminating to Mr. Setoodeh, and inform his future journalistic endeavors."

Jarrett Barrios, president of the LGBT media watchdog organization Gay and Lesbian Alliance Against Defamation (GLAAD) joined with openly gay Academy Award-winning screenwriter Dustin Lance Black to take Setoodeh to task, writing for The Hollywood Reporter:

"The whole posse of off-kilter anecdotes in "Straight Jacket" seem only to confirm one thing: America is starting to embrace open gay and lesbian actors in heterosexual roles on stage and screen and Setoodeh himself is not yet ready to. In one example, Setoodeh goes out of his way to call Sean Hayes "queeny" and assert it as a disqualifier for his straight role in "Promises, Promises." It's when the author peddles tired stereotypes like a [sic] "queeny" that the piece leans away from reality and tilts toward openly gay Setoodeh's own issues with sexuality and femininity. The truth is, the glass ceiling Setoodeh posits has been constructed by his own arguments -- ones that ignore fact after fact about the direction Hollywood is headed in 2010. Maybe Setoodeh can't see 'Glee' and 'Promises, Promises' except through a lens of dark stereotypes he's inherited. Maybe he's got some axe to grind. But whatever the reason, with the stakes so high for gay Americans at this moment, it is no excuse for his editors inflicting such hurtful — and baseless — musings on the readers of Newsweek. We'd all have been better off leaving Setoodeh's tortured thoughts on his therapist's couch and leaving baseless stories like this one on the editor's desk."

GLAAD further called upon Newsweek and Setoodeh to issue an apology.

Several openly gay actors, including Cheyenne Jackson, Michael Urie, Jane Lynch and Cynthia Nixon strongly criticized Setoodeh's article.

Three months after the article appeared, Groff spoke to British newspaper The Independent about it. Comparing the article to a bad review based on an actor's not using an appropriate accent for a role, Groff said "You just have to take it like any good or bad review, and try to let it roll off your back. I've played all kinds of characters, with all kinds of sexuality, and I hope to go on doing that."

== Setoodeh's response ==
On May 10, 2010, Ramin Setoodeh wrote a piece responding to the controversy. Titling it "Out of Focus", Setoodeh asserted that his intention "was not to disparage my own community, but to examine an issue that is being swept under the rug", the issue supposedly being that society as a whole has trouble accepting openly gay actors in straight roles, and that he wanted to start a debate on the subject. He characterized much of the criticism directed at him as "attacks" and said that his opponents were twisting his words. He denied assertions that he is self-loathing or homophobic.

Setoodeh's response prompted AfterElton.com editor Jensen to accuse Setoodeh of "play[ing] the victim card" and failing to address any of the criticisms that were leveled at the article. "If his goal was to start a 'debate,' and he says it was, it's telling how uninterested he seems to be in actually having that debate."

== Newsweek's response ==
Newsweek culture editor Marc Peyser sat down with Dustin Lance Black and Jarrett Barrios to discuss the fallout from Setoodeh's article and the broader issues of being openly gay in Hollywood. Barrios and Black continued to point out what they viewed as attacks on the ability and talent of gay actors and discussed whether an actor at the top of their profession could maintain a career after coming out.

== Defending Setoodeh ==
Screenwriter and producer Aaron Sorkin wrote a piece for The Huffington Post in which he asserted that people being critical of Setoodeh were missing the point. Assuring readers that Setoodeh is "on the side of the good guys", Sorkin wrote, "The problem doesn't have anything to do with sexual preference. The problem has everything to do with the fact that we know too much about each other and we care too much about what we know. In one short decade we have been reconditioned to be entertained by the most private areas of other people's lives." Rather than directing ire at Setoodeh or boycotting Newsweek, celebrities should "[b]oycott the red carpet instead. You're going to win the Emmy, Ryan, and you're going to get the whole publicity bump that comes with it. You and your cast should proudly walk past every microphone that's shoved in your faces."

Writing for The Hollywood Reporter, Andrew Wallenstein wrote that he could not understand what Setoodeh supposedly did wrong. Asserting that "sexual orientation can distort a performance, and in more ways than one", Wallenstein continues, "there is always the possibility that even the most brilliant closeted actor in the most incredibly scripted heterosexual role could fall short, especially in a romantic lead role". Gay actors, he wrote, should be considered for straight leading roles but they may not be successful in playing them, and it is possible that Setoodeh merely identified two who cannot. Regardless of whether that is true or not, people should not "vilify those who dare to speak their mind even when being unkind".
