= 2016–17 Granada CF season =

Granada CF
2016-17 season
- President: Jiang Lizhang
- Head coach: Paco Jémez (20 June - 28 September); Lucas Alcaraz (3 October 2016 - 10 April 2017); Tony Adams (from 10 April)
- Stadium: Los Cármenes
- La Liga: 20th (relegated)
- Copa del Rey: Round of 32
- Top goalscorer: League: Artem Kravets; Mehdi Carcela (5 each); All: Artem Kravets; Mehdi Carcela (5 each)
Home colours	Away colours	Third colours

The 2016–17 season was Granada CF's sixth season in La Liga following their promotion at the end of the 2010–11 season. Granada were relegated from La Liga, finishing 20th, and returned to the Segunda División for the first time since 2011. Granada also competed in the Copa del Rey, being knocked out in the Round of 32 by Osasuna.

== Season events ==
Prior to the start of the season, Granada appointed Paco Jémez to replace José González on 20 June 2016 Jémez was sacked on 28 September 2016, being replaced by Lucas Alcaraz on 3 October 2016. Alcaraz was then fired on 10 April 2017, with Tony Adams taking charge until the end of the season.

== Squad and statistics ==
=== Squad ===
As of 31 January 2017

Note: Flags indicate national team as defined under FIFA eligibility rules; some limited exceptions apply. Players may hold more than one non-FIFA nationality.

No.	Pos.	Nation	Player
1	GK	POR	Rui Silva
3	DF	URU	Gastón Silva (on loan from Torino)
4	MF	ESP	Sergi Samper (on loan from Barcelona)
5	DF	NGR	Uche (on loan from Watford)
6	DF	ESP	David Lombán (2nd captain)
7	FW	COL	Adrián Ramos (on loan from Borussia Dortmund)
8	MF	GHA	Mubarak Wakaso (on loan from Panathinaikos)
9	FW	ARG	Ezequiel Ponce (on loan from Roma)
10	MF	FRA	Jérémie Boga (on loan from Chelsea)
11	MF	GRE	Panagiotis Kone (on loan from Udinese)
13	GK	MEX	Guillermo Ochoa (on loan from Málaga)
14	DF	FRA	Franck Tabanou (on loan from Swansea City)
15	MF	ISR	Omer Atzili
16	MF	MAR	Mehdi Carcela

No.	Pos.	Nation	Player
17	DF	POR	Rúben Vezo (on loan from Valencia)
18	MF	BRA	Andreas Pereira (on loan from Manchester United)
19	MF	ESP	Isaac Cuenca
20	DF	FRA	Matthieu Saunier
21	MF	SLO	Rene Krhin
22	DF	FRA	Dimitri Foulquier (captain)
23	DF	ESP	Héctor (on loan from Real Sociedad)
24	FW	UKR	Artem Kravets (on loan from Dynamo Kyiv)
25	DF	ISL	Sverrir Ingi Ingason
26	MF	CIV	Victorien Angban (on loan from Chelsea)
29	MF	CMR	Martin Hongla
30	MF	ESP	Juanan Entrena
34	MF	MLI	Aly Mallé (on loan from Watford)
35	DF	ECU	Pervis Estupiñán (on loan from Watford)

==== Out on loan ====
Note: Flags indicate national team as defined under FIFA eligibility rules; some limited exceptions apply. Players may hold more than one non-FIFA nationality.

No.	Pos.	Nation	Player
—	GK	ESP	Oier Olazábal (at Levante until 30 June 2017)
—	DF	CHI	Valber Huerta (at Huachipato until 30 June 2017)
—	DF	ARG	Emanuel Insúa (at Racing Club until 30 June 2017)
—	DF	POR	Luís Martins (at Marítimo until 30 June 2018)
—	DF	ESP	Brian Oliván (at Cádiz until 30 June 2017)
—	DF	MLI	Molla Wagué (at Udinese until 30 June 2019)
—	DF	ESP	Tito (at Leganés until 30 June 2017)

No.	Pos.	Nation	Player
—	MF	ESP	Fran Rico (at Eibar until 30 June 2017)
—	MF	ESP	Rubén Pérez (at Leganés until 30 June 2017)
—	FW	ESP	Sergi Guardiola (at Murcia until 30 June 2017)
—	FW	BRA	Luizinho (at Atibaia until 30 June 2017)
—	FW	VEN	Darwin Machís (at Leganés until 30 June 2017)
—	FW	ECU	Kevin Mercado (at CSKA Sofia until 1 January 2018)

=== Statistics ===
As of Match played 25 April 2017

==== Appearances and goals ====
No.	Pos	Nat	Player	Total		La Liga		Copa del Rey	
No.	Pos	Nat	Player	Apps	Goals	Apps	Goals	Apps	Goals
3	DF	(Uruguay) URU	Gastón Silva	21	0	17+3	0	1	0
4	MF	(Spain) ESP	Sergi Samper	22	0	13+8	0	1	0
5	DF	(Nigeria) NGR	Uche	28	0	26+1	0	1	0
6	DF	(Spain) ESP	David Lombán	20	2	18	2	2	0
7	FW	(Colombia) COL	Adrián Ramos	10	2	9+1	2	0	0
8	MF	(Ghana) GHA	Mubarak Wakaso	11	1	10+1	1	0	0
9	FW	(Argentina) ARG	Ezequiel Ponce	26	2	10+14	2	2	0
10	MF	(France) FRA	Jérémie Boga	24	2	13+10	2	0+1	0
11	MF	(Greece) GRE	Panagiotis Kone	2	0	0+2	0	0	0
13	GK	(Mexico) MEX	Guillermo Ochoa	35	0	34	0	1	0
14	DF	(France) FRA	Franck Tabanou	9	0	7+1	0	1	0
15	MF	(Israel) ISR	Omer Atzili	11	0	3+6	0	2	0
16	MF	(Morocco) MAR	Mehdi Carcela	24	5	20+2	5	0+2	0
17	DF	(Portugal) POR	Rúben Vezo	17	0	15+1	0	0+1	0
18	MF	(Brazil) BRA	Andreas Pereira	33	4	30+1	4	0+2	0
19	MF	(Spain) ESP	Isaac Cuenca	23	2	15+7	2	1	0
20	DF	(France) FRA	Matthieu Saunier	17	0	16	0	1	0
21	MF	(Slovenia) SLO	Rene Krhin	9	0	8+1	0	0	0
22	DF	(France) FRA	Dimitri Foulquier	19	0	18+1	0	0	0
23	DF	(Spain) ESP	Héctor	12	0	10+2	0	0	0
24	FW	(Ukraine) UKR	Artem Kravets	26	5	16+10	5	0	0
25	DF	(Iceland) ISL	Sverrir Ingi Ingason	13	1	13	1	0	0
26	MF	(Ivory Coast) CIV	Victorien Angban	8	0	5+2	0	1	0
29	MF	(Cameroon) CMR	Martin Hongla	6	0	5+1	0	0	0
30	MF	(Spain) ESP	Juanan Entrena	1	0	0	0	0+1	0
34	MF	(Mali) MLI	Aly Mallé	8	0	4+4	0	0	0
35	DF	(Ecuador) ECU	Pervis Estupiñán	2	0	2	0	0	0
Players away from Granada on loan:
1	GK	(Spain) ESP	Oier	1	0	0	0	1	0
2	DF	(Spain) ESP	Tito	12	0	11+1	0	0	0
23	FW	(Spain) ESP	Alberto Bueno	15	1	5+8	1	2	0
Players who left Granada during the season:
7	FW	(Spain) ESP	David Barral	9	0	2+5	0	2	0
8	MF	(Spain) ESP	Javi Márquez	9	0	4+3	0	2	0
11	MF	(Spain) ESP	Jon Toral	5	1	4	0	1	1
12	DF	(Brazil) BRA	Gabriel Silva	13	0	11+1	0	1	0

==== Goalscorers ====
Place	Position	Nation	Number	Name	La Liga	Copa del Rey	Total
1	FW	(Ukraine)	24	Artem Kravets	5	0	5
1	MF	(Morocco)	16	Mehdi Carcela	5	0	5
3	MF	(Brazil)	18	Andreas Pereira	4	0	4
4	DF	(Spain)	6	David Lombán	2	0	2
4	FW	(Colombia)	7	Adrián Ramos	2	0	2
4	MF	(Spain)	19	Isaac Cuenca	2	0	2
4	MF	(France)	10	Jérémie Boga	2	0	2
4	FW	(Argentina)	9	Ezequiel Ponce	2	0	2
9	FW	(Spain)	23	Alberto Bueno	1	0	1
9	MF	(Ghana)	8	Mubarak Wakaso	1	0	1
9	DF	(Iceland)	25	Sverrir Ingi Ingason	1	0	1
9	MF	(Spain)	11	Jon Toral	0	1	1
				TOTALS	27	1	28

==== Disciplinary record ====
Number	Nation	Position	Name	La Liga		Copa del Rey		Total	
Number	Nation	Position	Name	Yellow card	Red card	Yellow card	Red card	Yellow card	Red card
2	(Spain)	DF	Tito	1	0	0	0	1	0
3	(Uruguay)	DF	Gastón Silva	6	0	0	0	6	0
4	(Spain)	MF	Sergi Samper	6	0	0	0	6	0
5	(Nigeria)	DF	Uche	13	2	0	0	13	2
6	(Spain)	DF	David Lombán	6	0	0	0	6	0
7	(Spain)	FW	David Barral	1	0	0	0	1	0
7	(Colombia)	FW	Adrián Ramos	4	0	0	0	4	0
8	(Spain)	DF	Javi Márquez	2	0	0	0	2	0
8	(Ghana)	MF	Mubarak Wakaso	8	1	0	0	8	1
9	(Argentina)	FW	Ezequiel Ponce	5	1	0	0	5	1
11	(Spain)	MF	Jon Toral	2	0	0	0	2	0
12	(Brazil)	DF	Gabriel Silva	3	0	0	0	3	0
13	(Mexico)	GK	Guillermo Ochoa	2	0	0	0	2	0
14	(France)	DF	Franck Tabanou	3	0	0	0	3	0
16	(Morocco)	MF	Mehdi Carcela	6	0	0	0	6	0
17	(Portugal)	DF	Rúben Vezo	4	1	0	0	4	1
18	(Brazil)	MF	Andreas Pereira	11	1	0	0	11	1
19	(Spain)	MF	Isaac Cuenca	4	0	0	0	4	0
20	(Spain)	DF	Matthieu Saunier	4	0	0	0	4	0
22	(France)	DF	Dimitri Foulquier	4	0	0	0	4	0
23	(Spain)	DF	Héctor	2	0	0	0	2	0
24	(Ukraine)	FW	Artem Kravets	2	0	0	0	2	0
25	(Iceland)	DF	Sverrir Ingi Ingason	6	0	0	0	6	0
26	(Ivory Coast)	MF	Victorien Angban	3	0	0	0	3	0
34	(Mali)	MF	Aly Mallé	2	0	0	0	2	0
35	(Ecuador)	DF	Pervis Estupiñán	1	0	0	0	1	0
			TOTALS	111	6	0	0	111	6

== Transfers ==
=== Summer ===
In: Note: Flags indicate national team as defined under FIFA eligibility rules; some limited exceptions apply. Players may hold more than one non-FIFA nationality.

No.	Pos.	Nation	Player
2	DF	ESP	Tito (from Rayo Vallecano)
3	DF	URU	Gastón Silva (on loan from Torino)
4	MF	ESP	Sergi Samper (on loan from Barcelona)
9	FW	ARG	Ezequiel Ponce (on loan from Roma)
10	MF	FRA	Jérémie Boga (on loan from Chelsea)
11	MF	ESP	Jon Toral (on loan from Arsenal, previously on loan at Birmingham City)
12	DF	BRA	Gabriel Silva (on loan from Udinese, previously on loan at Genoa)
13	GK	MEX	Guillermo Ochoa (on loan from Málaga)
14	DF	FRA	Franck Tabanou (on loan from Swansea City)
15	MF	ISR	Omer Atzili (from Beitar Jerusalem)
16	MF	MAR	Mehdi Carcela (from Benfica)
17	DF	POR	Rúben Vezo (on loan from Valencia)
18	MF	BRA	Andreas Pereira (on loan from Manchester United)
20	DF	FRA	Matthieu Saunier (from Troyes)
23	FW	ESP	Alberto Bueno (on loan from Porto)
24	FW	UKR	Artem Kravets (on loan from Dynamo Kyiv, previously on loan at VfB Stuttgart)
26	MF	CIV	Victorien Angban (on loan from Chelsea, previously on loan at Sint-Truiden)
28	DF	POR	Luís Martins (loan return from Osasuna)
—	FW	ECU	José Angulo (from Independiente del Valle)

Out: Note: Flags indicate national team as defined under FIFA eligibility rules; some limited exceptions apply. Players may hold more than one non-FIFA nationality.

No.	Pos.	Nation	Player
3	DF	ITA	Cristiano Biraghi (loan return to Inter Milan, later signed by Pescara)
5	DF	ESP	Diego Mainz
6	DF	MTQ	Jean-Sylvain Babin (to Sporting Gijón)
7	MF	ESP	Robert Ibáñez (loan return to Valencia)
9	FW	MAR	Youssef El-Arabi (to Lekhwiya)
11	FW	NGR	Isaac Success (to Watford)
12	DF	BRA	Dória (loan return to Marseille)
13	GK	ESP	Andrés Fernández (loan return to Porto, later loaned to Villarreal)
14	DF	ESP	Salva Ruiz (loan return to Valencia)
16	MF	FRA	Abdoulaye Doucouré (loan return to Watford)
17	MF	ESP	Édgar Méndez (to Alavés)
18	DF	POR	Miguel Lopes (loan return to Sporting CP)
20	MF	ESP	Rubén Pérez (on loan to Leganés)
23	MF	ESP	Rubén Rochina (to Rubin Kazan)
24	DF	POR	Ricardo Costa (to Luzern)
25	GK	ESP	Jesús Fernández (to Cádiz)
27	FW	VEN	Adalberto Peñaranda (to Watford, later loaned to Udinese)
35	GK	MKD	Stole Dimitrievski (to Gimnàstic)

=== Winter ===
In: Note: Flags indicate national team as defined under FIFA eligibility rules; some limited exceptions apply. Players may hold more than one non-FIFA nationality.

No.	Pos.	Nation	Player
7	FW	COL	Adrián Ramos (loan from (Germany) Borussia Dortmund)
8	MF	GHA	Mubarak Wakaso (loan from (Greece) Panathinaikos)
11	MF	GRE	Panagiotis Kone (loan from (Italy) Udinese)
23	DF	ESP	Héctor (loan from (Spain) Real Sociedad)
25	DF	ISL	Sverrir Ingi Ingason (from (Belgium) Lokeren)

Out: Note: Flags indicate national team as defined under FIFA eligibility rules; some limited exceptions apply. Players may hold more than one non-FIFA nationality.

No.	Pos.	Nation	Player
1	GK	ESP	Oier Olazábal (loan to (Spain) Levante)
2	DF	ESP	Tito (loan to (Spain) Leganés)
7	FW	ESP	David Barral (to (Cyprus) APOEL)
8	MF	ESP	Javi Márquez (to (United States) New York Cosmos)
11	MF	ESP	Jon Toral (loan return to (England) Arsenal)
12	DF	BRA	Gabriel Silva (loan return to (Italy) Udinese)
25	GK	CRO	Ivan Kelava (to (Hungary) Debreceni)
28	DF	POR	Luís Martins (loan to (Portugal) Marítimo)

== Competitions ==
=== La Liga ===
==== Table ====
Pos	Team	Pld	W	D	L	GF	GA	GD	Pts	Qualification or relegation
16	Deportivo La Coruña	38	8	12	18	43	61	−18	36	
17	Leganés	38	8	11	19	36	55	−19	35	
18	Sporting Gijón (R)	38	7	10	21	42	72	−30	31	Relegation to Segunda División
19	Osasuna (R)	38	4	10	24	40	94	−54	22	Relegation to Segunda División
20	Granada (R)	38	4	8	26	30	82	−52	20	Relegation to Segunda División

Source: La Liga, Soccerway
Rules for classification: 1) Points; 2) Head-to-head points; 3) Head-to-head goal difference; 4) Goal difference; 5) Goals scored; 6) Fair-play points; 7) Play-off.
(R) Relegated

==== Results summary ====
Overall								Home						Away					
Pld	W	D	L	GF	GA	GD	Pts	W	D	L	GF	GA	GD	W	D	L	GF	GA	GD
38	4	8	26	30	82	−52	20	4	4	11	17	32	−15	0	4	15	13	50	−37

Last updated: 19 May 2017.
Source: See results

==== Results by matchday ====
Matchday	1	2	3	4	5	6	7	8	9	10	11	12	13	14	15	16	17	18	19	20	21	22	23	24	25	26	27	28	29	30	31	32	33	34	35	36	37	38
Ground	H	A	H	A	H	A	H	A	H	A	H	A	A	H	A	H	A	H	A	A	H	A	H	A	H	A	H	A	H	A	H	H	A	H	A	H	A	H
Result	D	L	L	D	L	L	L	L	D	L	D	D	L	W	D	L	L	D	L	L	W	L	W	L	W	L	L	L	L	D	L	L	L	L	L	L	L	L
Position	20	20	20	20	20	20	20	20	20	20	19	19	19	19	19	19	19	19	19	19	19	19	19	19	18	18	18	19	19	19	19	19	19	19	19	19	20	20

Updated to match(es) played on 19 May 2017. Source: See results
A = Away; H = Home; W = Win; D = Draw; L = Loss

==== Results ====
20 August 2016 1	Granada	1–1	Villarreal	Granada
20:15 CEST (UTC+2)	Lombán (yellow card) 15'; Ponce 65'; Barral (yellow card) 69'	Report	Sansone (yellow card) 28'; N'Diaye (yellow card) 46'; Trigueros (yellow card) 53'; Castillejo 61'	Stadium: Los Cármenes; Attendance: 15,149; Referee: Xavier Estrada Fernández

28 August 2016 2	Las Palmas	5–1	Granada	Las Palmas
18:15 CEST (UTC+2)	Livaja (yellow card) 22'; El Zhar 23', 69', (yellow card) 67'; Boateng (yellow card) 41', (goal) 51'; Momo 72'; Castellano (yellow card) 77'; Mesa (yellow card) 79'; Araujo 85'	Report	Boga 45'; Gas.Silva (yellow card) 63'	Stadium: Gran Canaria; Attendance: 18,529; Referee: Daniel Ocón Arráiz

11 September 2016 3	Granada	1–2	Eibar	Granada
18:15 CEST (UTC+2)	Kravets 76'; Pereira (yellow card) 82'; Vezo (yellow card) 90'	Report	Riesgo (red card) 32'; Pedro León 43'; Enrich 90+4'	Stadium: Los Cármenes; Attendance: 15,916; Referee: Daniel Trujillo Suárez

16 September 2016 4	Real Betis	2–2	Granada	Seville
20:45 CEST (UTC+2)	Alegría 36', 61'; Musonda (yellow card) 63'; Adán (yellow card) 77'; Durmisi (yellow card) 79'; Giménez (yellow card) 85' (yellow-red card) 85'; Gutiérrez (yellow card) 88'	Report	Carcela 13' (yellow card) 81'; Bueno 33'; Vezo (yellow card) 52' (yellow-red card) 54'; Ponce (yellow card) 74'; Angban (yellow card) 80'	Stadium: Benito Villamarín; Attendance: 34,236; Referee: Carlos del Cerro Grande

21 September 2016 5	Granada	1–2	Athletic Bilbao	Granada
22:00 CEST (UTC+2)	Foulquier (yellow card) 17'; Carcela 44'	Report	García 15'; Laporte 77'	Stadium: Estadio Nuevo Los Cármenes; Attendance: 14,662; Referee: Juan Martínez Munuera

26 September 2016 6	Alavés	3–1	Granada	Vitoria-Gasteiz
20:45 CEST (UTC+2)	Alexis (yellow card) 35'; Édgar 52'; Laguardia (yellow card) 63'; Camarasa 66'; Deyverson 90+3', (yellow card) 90+3'	Report	Uche (yellow card) 26'; Márquez (yellow card) 58'; Carcela (yellow card) 64'; Kravets 78'	Stadium: Mendizorrotza; Attendance: 16,371; Referee: José González González

1 October 2016 7	Granada	0–1	Leganés	Granada
13:00 CEST (UTC+2)	Ponce (yellow card) 53'	Report	Szymanowski 76'	Stadium: Los Cármenes; Attendance: 15,196; Referee: Santiago Jaime Latre

15 October 2016 8	Atlético Madrid	7–1	Granada	Madrid
18:30 CEST (UTC+2)	Carrasco 34', 45', 61'; Correa (yellow card) 60', (goal) 85'; Gaitán 63', 81'; Tiago 87'	Report	Cuenca 18'; Uche (yellow card) 64'	Stadium: Vicente Calderón; Attendance: 48,278; Referee: Ricardo de Burgos Bengoetxea

22 October 2016 9	Granada	0–0	Sporting de Gijón	Granada
20:45 CEST (UTC+2)	Angban (yellow card) 71'; Uche (yellow card) 75'; Kravets (yellow card) 90'; Cuenca (yellow card) 90+2'	Report	Álvarez (yellow card) 80'	Stadium: Los Cármenes; Attendance: 14,692; Referee: Iñaki Vicandi Garrido

29 October 2016 10	Barcelona	1–0	Granada	Barcelona
CEST (UTC+2)	Rafinha 48'; Neymar (yellow card) 87'	Report	Gab.Silva (yellow card) 11'; Toral (yellow card) 73'; Lombán (yellow card) 79'; Vezo (yellow card) 87'	Stadium: Camp Nou; Attendance: 82,914; Referee: Juan Martínez Munuera

5 November 2016 11	Granada	1–1	Deportivo La Coruña	Granada
13:00 CET (UTC+1)	Saunier (yellow card) 22'; Lombán 81'	Report	Borges (yellow card) 38'; Luisinho (yellow card) 59'; Andone 64'	Stadium: Los Cármenes; Attendance: 13,328; Referee: Alberto Undiano Mallenco

20 November 2016 12	Valencia	1–1	Granada	Valencia
16:15 CET (UTC+1)	Cancelo (yellow card) 7'; Nani 47'	Report	Pereira (yellow card) 19'; Carcela 45+1'; Toral (yellow card) 49'; Samper (yellow card) 72'; Ochoa (yellow card) 79'; Uche (yellow card) 90+3'	Stadium: Mestalla; Attendance: 34,884; Referee: Alejandro Hernández Hernández

27 November 2016 13	Celta Vigo	3–1	Granada	Vigo
18:30 CET (UTC+1)	Aspas 23'; Bongonda 39'; Diop 90+3'	Report	Pereira (yellow card) 34'; Samper (yellow card) 41'; Tabanou (yellow card) 62'; Kravets 87'	Stadium: Balaídos; Attendance: 15,697; Referee: Daniel Trujillo Suárez

3 December 2016 14	Granada	2–1	Sevilla	Granada
13:00 CET (UTC+1)	Pereira 27', (yellow card) 28'; Gab.Silva (yellow card) 34'; Carcela (yellow card) 40'; Lombán 56', (yellow card) 90+4'; Márquez (yellow card) 81'	Report	Vázquez (yellow card) 44'; Iborra (yellow card) 63'; Ben Yedder 90+5' (pen.)	Stadium: Los Cármenes; Attendance: 15,832; Referee: José González González

9 December 2016 15	Málaga	1–1	Granada	Málaga
20:45 CET (UTC+1)	Camacho 24'; Torres (yellow card) 43'; Fornals (yellow card) 46'; Villanueva (yellow card) 90+2'	Report	Tito (yellow card) 27'; Uche (yellow card) 47'; Saunier (yellow card) 61'; Cuenca (yellow card) 74'; Kravets 81'; Lombán (yellow card) 87'	Stadium: La Rosaleda; Attendance: 20,299; Referee: Alfonso Álvarez Izquierdo

17 December 2016 16	Granada	0–2	Real Sociedad	Granada
18:30 CET (UTC+1)		Report	Granero (yellow card) 53'; Bautista 56'; Juanmi 69'	Stadium: Los Cármenes; Attendance: 12,812; Referee: Daniel Ocón Arráiz

7 January 2017 17	Real Madrid	5–0	Granada	Madrid
13:00 CET (UTC+1)	Isco 12', 31'; Benzema 20'; Ronaldo 27'; Casemiro 58', (yellow card) 71'	Report	Samper (yellow card) 44'; Uche (yellow card) 57'; Gab.Silva (yellow card) 70'; Tabanou (yellow card) 72'	Stadium: Santiago Bernabéu; Attendance: 67,839; Referee: Iñaki Vicandi Garrido

15 January 2017 18	Granada	1–1	Osasuna	Granada
18:30 CET (UTC+1)	Pereira (yellow card) 11'; Kravets 69'; Ponce (yellow card) 72' (yellow-red card) 90+5'; Uche (red card) 73'; Tabanou (yellow card) 83'	Report	Riera 12', (yellow card) 66'; Fausto (yellow card) 13'; García (yellow card) 67'; Berenguer (yellow card) 79'	Stadium: Los Cármenes; Attendance: 14,328; Referee: Daniel Trujillo Suárez

21 January 2017 19	Espanyol	3–1	Granada	Barcelona
13:00 CET (UTC+1)	Reyes 11'; Piatti 32'; Navarro 48'	Report	Ingason (yellow card) 18'; Pereira 23', (yellow card) 90+2'; Foulquier (yellow card) 49'	Stadium: RCDE Stadium; Attendance: 14,813; Referee: Carlos Clos Gómez

28 January 2017 20	Villarreal	2–0	Granada	Villarreal
13:00 CET (UTC+1)	Álvaro (yellow card) 37', (goal) 73'; Soriano (yellow card) 38'; Bruno 42'; José Ángel (yellow card) 88'	Report	Samper (yellow card) 48'; Gas.Silva (yellow card) 75'	Stadium: La Cerámica; Attendance: 14,757; Referee: Alfonso Álvarez Izquierdo

6 February 2017 21	Granada	1–0	Las Palmas	Granada
20:45 CET (UTC+1)	Pereira 17', (yellow card) 31'; Uche (yellow card) 52'; Ramos (yellow card) 73'; Saunier (yellow card) 77'; Gas.Silva (yellow card) 89'	Report	Boateng (yellow card) 66'; Bigas (yellow card) 71'; Lemos (yellow card) 90+4'	Stadium: Los Cármenes; Attendance: 14,001; Referee: Carlos del Cerro Grande

13 February 2017 22	Eibar	4–0	Granada	Eibar
20:45 CET (UTC+1)	Adrián 11' (pen.), (yellow card) 13'; Enrich 39'; Ramis 52'; Pedro León 62'; D. García (yellow card) 72'	Report	Lombán (yellow card) 51'; Uche (yellow card) 68'	Stadium: Ipurua; Attendance: 4,855; Referee: Antonio Mateu Lahoz

17 February 2017 23	Granada	4–1	Real Betis	Granada
20:45 CET (UTC+1)	Carcela 18'; Ramos 28', 64', (yellow card) 62'; Pereira 33', (yellow card) 55' (red card) 66'; Wakaso (yellow card) 40'; Uche (yellow card) 81'	Report	Martin (yellow card) 49'; Matías Nahuel (red card) 66'; Petros 75'	Stadium: Los Cármenes; Attendance: 15,927; Referee: Daniel Ocón Arráiz

26 February 2017 24	Athletic Bilbao	3–1	Granada	Bilbao
18:30 CET (UTC+1)	Susaeta 11'; Lekue 33'; San José 69'; Williams (yellow card) 88'	Report	Carcela 14'; Wakaso (yellow card) 59'; Ramos (yellow card) 61'; Gas.Silva (yellow card) 69'; Ochoa (yellow card) 69'; Samper (yellow card) 80'	Stadium: San Mamés; Attendance: 37,563; Referee: Daniel Trujillo Suárez

1 March 2017 25	Granada	2–1	Alavés	Granada
21:30 CET (UTC+1)	Wakaso 38'; Carcela (yellow card) 45'; Cuenca 53', (yellow card) 90+3'; Uche (yellow card) 78'; Héctor (yellow card) 81'; Gas.Silva (yellow card) 83'; Ingason (yellow card) 90+1'	Report	Vigaray (yellow card) 12'; Romero (yellow card) 24'; Torres (yellow card) 30'; Camarasa 57'; Katai (yellow card) 90+1' (red card) 90+3'; Alexis (yellow card) 90+4' (yellow-red card) 90+4'; Hernandez (yellow card) 90+6'	Stadium: Los Cármenes; Attendance: 14,110; Referee: Ignacio Iglesias Villanueva

4 March 2017 26	Leganés	1–0	Granada	Leganés
13:00 CET (UTC+1)	Morán (yellow card) 82'; Machís 83'; Siovas (yellow card) 90'; Rico (yellow card) 90'	Report	Carcela (yellow card) 44'; Wakaso (yellow card) 64'	Stadium: Butarque; Attendance: 9,472; Referee: Juan Martínez Munuera

12 March 2017 27	Granada	0–1	Atlético Madrid	Granada
17:00 CET (UTC+1)	Saunier (yellow card) 24'; Ingason (yellow card) 48'; Foulquier (yellow card) 68'; Wakaso (yellow card) 72' (yellow-red card) 90+4'	Report	Carrasco (yellow card) 57'; Juanfran (yellow card) 81'; Griezmann 84'; Godín (yellow card) 90+1'	Stadium: Los Cármenes; Attendance: 18,960; Referee: Alejandro Hernández Hernández

19 March 2017 28	Sporting de Gijón	3–1	Granada	Gijón
18:30 CET (UTC+1)	Traoré 60'; Babin 64'; Douglas (yellow card) 65'; Carmona 67'; Meré (yellow card) 90+2'	Report	Angban (yellow card) 37'; Ingason 51', (yellow card) 81'; Foulquier (yellow card) 60'; Mallé (yellow card) 86'	Stadium: El Molinón; Attendance: 24,129; Referee: Xavier Estrada Fernández

2 April 2017 29	Granada	1–4	Barcelona	Granada
20:45 CEST (UTC+2)	Boga 50'; Lombán (yellow card) 59'; Uche (yellow card) 79' (yellow-red card) 82'	Report	Roberto (yellow card) 28'; L. Suárez 44'; Alba (yellow card) 60'; Alcácer 64'; Rakitić (yellow card) 77', (goal) 83'; Neymar 90+1'	Stadium: Los Cármenes; Attendance: 18,717; Referee: Santiago Jaime Latre

5 April 2017 30	Deportivo La Coruña	0–0	Granada	A Coruña
20:30 CEST (UTC+2)	John (yellow card) 90+1'	Report	Héctor (yellow card) 45'; Estupiñán (yellow card) 75'; Pereira (yellow card) 76'; Cuenca (yellow card) 90+31'	Stadium: Riazor; Attendance: 19,303; Referee: Carlos del Cerro Grande

9 April 2017 31	Granada	1–3	Valencia	Granada
12:00 CEST (UTC+2)	Uche (yellow card) 39'; Ponce 65'; Wakaso (yellow card) 70'	Report	Zaza 19', 21'; Soler (yellow card) 46'; Mina 55'; Montoya (yellow card) 74'	Stadium: Los Cármenes; Attendance: 15,159; Referee: Iñaki Vicandi Garrido

16 April 2017 32	Granada	0–3	Celta Vigo	Granada
20:45 CEST (UTC+2)	Ingason (yellow card) 37'; Wakaso (yellow card) 38'; Kravets (yellow card) 41'; Gas.Silva (yellow card) 81'; Ponce (yellow card) 88'	Report	Jozabed 23'; Díaz (yellow card) 58', (goal) 73'; Lemos (yellow card) 59'; Beauvue 76'	Stadium: Los Cármenes; Referee: José María Sánchez Martínez

21 April 2017 33	Sevilla	2–0	Granada	Seville
21:00 CEST (UTC+2)	Ganso 4', 46'; Correa (yellow card) 64'	Report	Pereira (yellow card) 32'; Samper (yellow card) 84'	Stadium: Ramón Sánchez Pizjuán; Referee: Daniel Trujillo Suárez

25 April 2017 34	Granada	0–2	Málaga	Granada
20:30 CEST (UTC+2)	Ingason (yellow card) 10'; Carcela (yellow card) 27'; Ramos (yellow card) 49'; Wakaso (yellow card) 51'; Mallé (yellow card) 72'	Report	Sandro 47', 90+2'	Stadium: Los Cármenes; Attendance: 12,099; Referee: Carlos Clos Gómez

29 April 2017 35	Real Sociedad	2–1	Granada	San Sebastián
13:00 CEST (UTC+2)	Vela 45'; Juanmi 84'	Report	Angban (yellow card) 42'; Ramos 65'; Ponce (yellow card) 80'; Hongla (yellow card) 87'	Stadium: Anoeta; Attendance: 18,003; Referee: Antonio Mateu Lahoz

6 May 2017 36	Granada	0–4	Real Madrid	Granada
20:45 CEST (UTC+2)	Ingason (yellow card) 88'	Report	Rodríguez 3', 11'; Morata 30', 35'	Stadium: Los Cármenes; Attendance: 19,094; Referee: Ignacio Iglesias Villanueva

13 May 2017 37	Osasuna	2–1	Granada	Pamplona
18:30 CEST (UTC+2)	Mondragón 24'; Kodro 75'; León (yellow card) 90+3'	Summary	Ramos 41'; Hongla (yellow card) 55'; Foulquier (yellow card) 67'; Uche (yellow card) 86'	Stadium: El Sadar Stadium; Attendance: 13,301; Referee: Iñaki Vicandi Garrido

19 May 2017 38	Granada	1–2	Espanyol	Granada
20:45 CEST (UTC+2)	Pereira 22'	Summary	Baptistão 3'; Vezo 8' (o.g.); Roca (yellow card) 62'; Piatti (yellow card) 66'; Álvarez (yellow card) 90+1'	Stadium: Los Cármenes; Attendance: 10,503; Referee: Carlos Clos Gómez

=== Copa del Rey ===
30 November 2016 Round of 32 First Leg	Granada	1–0	Osasuna	Granada
21:00 CET (UTC+1)	Toral 52'	Report		Stadium: Los Cármenes; Attendance: 8,872; Referee: Iñaki Vicandi Garrido

21 December 2016 Round of 32 Second Leg	Osasuna	2–0 (2–1 agg.)	Granada	Pamplona
21:00 CET (UTC+1)	Berenguer 45+2'; Romero 59'; U. García (yellow card) 75'; Riera (yellow card) 86'; Fernández (yellow card) 87'	Report		Stadium: El Sadar; Attendance: 9,464; Referee: Carlos del Cerro Grande

=== Trofeo Ciudad de Palma ===
13 August 2016
14:00 CEST

Mallorca	2–3	Granada
Colunga 18'; Sánchez 51'	Report	Ponce 63', 83'; Toral 87'

Estadi Mallorca Son Moix, Palma de Mallorca
Attendance: 3,000-5,000
Referee: Guillermo Cuadra Fernández
