= 2015–16 Granada CF season =

Granada
2015–16 season
- President: John Purdy
- Head coach: José Ramón Sandoval
- Stadium: Estadio Nuevo Los Cármenes
- La Liga: 12th
- Copa del Rey: Round of 32
- Top goalscorer: League: Youssef El-Arabi (16 goals); All: Youssef El-Arabi (17 goals)
Home colours	Away colours	Third colours

The 2015–16 season was the 84th season in Granada's history and the 22nd in the top-tier.

== Players ==
=== Current squad ===
As of 31 August 2015

Note: Flags indicate national team as defined under FIFA eligibility rules; some limited exceptions apply. Players may hold more than one non-FIFA nationality.

No.	Pos.	Nation	Player
1	GK	CRO	Ivan Kelava
2	DF	ESP	David Lombán
3	DF	ITA	Cristiano Biraghi (on loan from Internazionale)
4	MF	ESP	Fran Rico
5	DF	ESP	Diego Mainz (captain)
6	DF	MTQ	Jean-Sylvain Babin
7	MF	ESP	Robert Ibáñez (on loan from Valencia)
8	MF	ESP	Javi Márquez
9	FW	MAR	Youssef El-Arabi
10	MF	ESP	Piti (vice-captain)
11	FW	NGR	Isaac Success
13	GK	ESP	Andrés Fernández (on loan from Porto)
14	DF	ESP	Salva Ruiz (on loan from Valencia)

No.	Pos.	Nation	Player
15	FW	URU	Nico López (on loan from Udinese)
16	FW	CGO	Thievy Bifouma (on loan from Espanyol)
17	MF	ESP	Édgar Méndez
20	MF	ESP	Rubén Pérez
21	MF	SLO	Rene Krhin
22	DF	FRA	Dimitri Foulquier
23	MF	ESP	Rubén Rochina
24	DF	GAB	Yrondu Musavu-King
25	DF	POR	Miguel Lopes (on loan from Sporting CP)
35	GK	MKD	Stole Dimitrievski
—	DF	BRA	Neuton (on loan from Udinese)
—	DF	BRA	Dória (on loan from Marseille)

=== Out on loan ===
Note: Flags indicate national team as defined under FIFA eligibility rules; some limited exceptions apply. Players may hold more than one non-FIFA nationality.

No.	Pos.	Nation	Player
—	GK	ESP	Oier Olazábal (on loan at Real Sociedad)
—	DF	ESP	Aridane Hernández (on loan at Cádiz)
—	DF	ESP	Juanpe (on loan at Valladolid)
—	DF	ARG	Emanuel Insúa (on loan at Udinese)
—	DF	POR	Luís Martins (on loan at Osasuna)
—	MF	ESP	Álvaro García (on loan at Cádiz)
—	MF	ESP	Christian Arco (on loan at Algeciras)

No.	Pos.	Nation	Player
—	MF	GHA	Mohammed Fatau (on loan at Almería)
—	MF	PER	Sergio Peña (on loan at Alianza Lima)
—	FW	COL	Jhon Córdoba (on loan at Mainz 05)
—	FW	COL	Wilson Cuero (on loan at Cádiz)
—	FW	VEN	Darwin Machís (on loan at Huesca)
—	FW	ECU	Kevin Mercado (on loan at Godoy Cruz)

== Competitions ==
=== Overall ===
Competition	Started round	Final position / round	First match	Last match
La Liga	–			
Copa del Rey	Round of 32			

Updated to match played 8 September 2015
Source: Competitions

=== Overview ===
Competition	Record							
Competition	Pld	W	D	L	GF	GA	GD	Win %
La Liga	38	10	9	19	46	69	−23	26.32
Copa del Rey	4	1	0	3	2	9	−7	25.00
Total	42	11	9	22	48	78	−30	26.19

Last updated: 14 May 2016
Source: Competitions

=== La Liga ===
==== League table ====
Pos	Team	Pld	W	D	L	GF	GA	GD	Pts	Qualification or relegation
14	Eibar	38	11	10	17	49	61	−12	43 (Note: Espanyol finished ahead of Eibar on head-to-head goal difference; Eibar 2–1 Espanyol, Espanyol 4–2 Eibar.)	
15	Deportivo La Coruña	38	8	18	12	45	61	−16	42	
16	Granada	38	10	9	19	46	69	−23	39 (Note: Granada finished ahead of Sporting Gijón on head-to-head record; Granada 2–0 Sporting Gijón, Sporting Gijón 3–3 Granada.)	
17	Sporting Gijón	38	10	9	19	40	62	−22	39	
18	Rayo Vallecano (R)	38	9	11	18	52	73	−21	38	Relegation to Segunda División

Source: La Liga, Soccerway
Rules for classification: 1) Points; 2) Head-to-head points; 3) Head-to-head goal difference; 4) Goal difference; 5) Goals scored; 6) Fair-play points; 7) Play-off.
(R) Relegated

==== Results summary ====
Overall								Home						Away					
Pld	W	D	L	GF	GA	GD	Pts	W	D	L	GF	GA	GD	W	D	L	GF	GA	GD
38	10	9	19	46	69	−23	39	6	5	8	26	31	−5	4	4	11	20	38	−18

Last updated: 14 May 2016.

==== Result round by round ====
Round	1	2	3	4	5	6	7	8	9	10	11	12	13	14	15	16	17	18	19	20	21	22	23	24	25	26	27	28	29	30	31	32	33	34	35	36	37	38
Ground	H	A	H	A	H	A	H	A	H	A	A	H	A	H	A	H	A	H	A	A	H	A	H	A	H	A	H	A	H	H	A	H	A	H	A	H	A	H
Result	L	W	L	L	L	L	D	D	D	D	L	W	D	L	W	L	L	W	L	L	W	L	L	L	L	W	W	L	D	D	D	D	L	W	L	W	W	L
Position	20	7	11	15	18	20	20	20	19	18	19	17	17	18	17	17	18	17	17	17	16	18	19	19	20	19	18	18	17	17	17	17	17	17	17	16	16	16

Updated to match(es) played on 9 May 2016. Source:
A = Away; H = Home; W = Win; D = Draw; L = Loss

==== Matches ====
Win Draw Loss

24 August 2015 1	Granada	1–3	Eibar	Granada
20:30 (UTC+2)	Rochina 50'; Salva Ruiz (red card) 56'; Mainz (yellow card) 89'	Report	Keko (yellow card) 21'; Adrián 22', (yellow card) 45'; Escalante 35', (yellow card) 64'; García (yellow card) 55'; Luna (yellow card) 61'; Arruabarrena 67'; Capa (yellow card) 90+4'	Stadium: Nuevo Los Cármenes; Attendance: 14,833; Referee: Ignacio Iglesias Villanueva

28 August 2015 2	Getafe	1–2	Granada	Madrid
22:30 (UTC+2)	Rochina 50'; Ruiz (red card) 56'; Mainz (yellow card) 89'	Report	Keko (yellow card) 21'; Adrián 22', (yellow card) 45'; Escalante 35', (yellow card) 64'; García (yellow card) 55'; Luna (yellow card) 61'; Arruabarrena 67'; Capa (yellow card) 90+4'	Stadium: Alfonso Pérez; Attendance: 4,532; Referee: Prieto Iglesias

13 September 2015 3	Granada	1–3	Villarreal	Granada
12:00 (UTC+2)	Babin (yellow card) 11'; Lopes (yellow card) 65'; Rico 74'	Report	Pina (yellow card) 14'; Trigueros 49'; Bakambu 51'; Soldado (yellow card) 67'; Baily (yellow card) 81'; Areola (yellow card) 90'; Samu 90+1'	Stadium: Nuevo Los Cármenes; Attendance: 13,954; Referee: Gil Manzano

19 September 2015 4	Real Madrid	1–0	Granada	Madrid
16:00 CEST (UTC+02:00)	Isco (yellow card) 43'; Benzema 55'	Report	Édgar (yellow card) 35'; Márquez (yellow card) 70'; Krhin (yellow card) 80'	Stadium: Santiago Bernabéu; Attendance: 71,786; Referee: Juan Martínez Munuera

22 September 2015 5	Granada	0–3	Real Sociedad	Granada
22:00 CEST (UTC+02:00)	Krhin (yellow card) 38'; Dória (yellow card) 40'; Success (yellow card) 46'; Fernández (yellow card) 62'; Lopes (yellow card) 81'	Report	Agirretxe 7', 33', 79'; Granero (yellow card) 37'; De la Bella (yellow card) 60'; Vela (yellow card) 66'; Pardo (yellow card) 90+3'	Stadium: Nuevo Los Cármenes; Attendance: 12,711; Referee: Estrada Fernández

25 September 2015 6	Valencia	1–0	Granada	Valencia
20:30 CEST (UTC+02:00)	Mustafi 26', (yellow card) 34'; Pérez (yellow card) 30'; Orbán (yellow card) 71'	Report	Dória (yellow card) 31'; Lopes (yellow card) 38'; Uche (yellow card) 72'	Stadium: Mestalla; Attendance: 37,158; Referee: Clos Gómez

3 October 2015 7	Granada	1–1	Deportivo La Coruña	Granada
18:15 CEST (UTC+02:00)	Piti 65'; Success (yellow card) 90+2'	Report	Fajr 25'; Gutiérrez (yellow card) 62'; Arribas (yellow card) 87'; Riera (yellow card) 90'	Stadium: Nuevo Los Cármenes; Attendance: 14,228; Referee: Vicandi Garrido

19 October 2015 8	Sporting Gijón	3–3	Granada	Gijón
20:30 CEST (UTC+02:00)	Bernardo 8'; Cases (yellow card) 71'; Halilović (yellow card) 71'; Álvarez (yellow card) 72'	Report	Piti (yellow card) 7', (goal) 21'; Biraghi (yellow card) 39'; Success 41', (yellow card) 64'; Lopes (yellow card) 53' (yellow-red card) 81'; Pérez (yellow card) 59'; El-Arabi 73'; Dória (yellow card) 89' (yellow-red card) 90+2'	Stadium: El Molinón; Attendance: 19,749; Referee: Álvarez Izquierdo

24 October 2015 9	Granada	1–1	Real Betis	Granada
18:15 CEST (UTC+02:00)	Foulquier 3'; Márquez (yellow card) 33'; Pérez (yellow card) 39'; Biraghi (yellow card) 78'	Report	Castro 40' (pen.); Varela (yellow card) 69'; Portillo (yellow card) 78'; Digard (yellow card) 84'	Stadium: Nuevo Los Cármenes; Attendance: 18,358; Referee: Mateu Lahoz

1 November 2015 10	Espanyol	1–1	Granada	Barcelona
16:00 CET (UTC+01:00)	Rober (yellow card) 57' (yellow-red card) 68'; Roco (yellow card) 83'; Caicedo 90+4'	Report	Márquez (yellow card) 35'; Lombán (yellow card) 36'; Babin 58', (yellow card) 87'; Biraghi (yellow card) 62'; Rochina (yellow card) 70'; Pérez (yellow card) 84'	Stadium: Cornellà-El Prat; Attendance: 16,684; Referee: Hernández Hernández

7 November 2015 11	Rayo Vallecano	2–1	Granada	Madrid
20:30 CET (UTC+01:00)	Guerra 3', 10'; Castro (yellow card) 13' (yellow-red card) 19'; Tito (yellow card) 46'; Trashorras (yellow card) 90+3'	Report	Piti (yellow card) 45+2'; Babin 53'; Krhin (yellow card) 63'; Pérez (yellow card) 70'	Stadium: Vallecas; Attendance: 9,921; Referee: Gil Manzano

22 November 2016 12	Granada	2–0	Athletic Bilbao	Granada
18:15 CET (UTC+01:00)	Laporte 5' (o.g.); Peñaranda (yellow card) 6'; Robert (yellow card) 59'; Success 59', (yellow card) 60'; Pérez (yellow card) 86'; Fernández (yellow card) 90+1'	Report	Susaeta (yellow card) 23'; Aduriz (yellow card) 24'; Etxeita (yellow card) 36'	Stadium: Nuevo Los Cármenes; Attendance: 13,031; Referee: Carlos del Cerro (Madrid)

28 November 2015 13	Málaga	2–2	Granada	Málaga
20:30 CET (UTC+01:00)	Tissone (yellow card) 37' (yellow-red card) 53'; Charles 45'; Rosales (yellow card) 51'; Fornals 57'; Torres (yellow card) 65'	Report	Lombán (yellow card) 27'; Lopes (yellow card) 56'; Ibáñez (yellow card) 65'; Márquez (yellow card) 75'; El-Arabi 83'; Rochina 86', (yellow card) 90+2'; Foulquier (yellow card) 90'	Stadium: La Rosaleda; Attendance: 22,931; Referee: Estrada Fernández

5 December 2015 14	Granada	0–2	Atlético Madrid	Granada
18:15 CET (UTC+01:00)	Foulquier (yellow card) 19'; Rico (yellow card) 28'	Report	Godín 20'; Saúl (yellow card) 40'; Griezmann 76'	Stadium: Los Cármenes; Attendance: 15,872; Referee: Eduardo Prieto Iglesias

12 December 2015 15	Levante	1–2	Granada	Valencia
18:15 (UTC+1)	Simão Mate (yellow card) 59', (goal) 66'; Verza (yellow card) 72'	Report	Peñaranda 50', 88'; Rico (yellow card) 65'; Fernández (yellow card) 78'	Stadium: Ciutat de València; Attendance: 12,284; Referee: Vicandi Garrido

20 December 2015 16	Granada	0–2	Celta Vigo	Granada
18:15 CET (UTC+01:00)	Rochina (yellow card) 44'; Success (yellow card) 54'; Pérez (yellow card) 56'; Uche (yellow card) 90+1'	Summary	Aspas (yellow card) 18', (goal) 45'; Orellana 21'; Planas (yellow card) 54'	Stadium: Los Cármenes; Attendance: 14,537; Referee: Juan Martínez Munuera

30 December 2015 17	Las Palmas	4–1	Granada	Las Palmas
21:00 CET (UTC+01:00)	Tana 32'; Araujo 50'; Mesa (yellow card) 63'; Gómez (yellow card) 72'; Viera 80' (pen.); Wakaso (yellow card) 87'	Report	Peñaranda (yellow card) 41', (goal) 56'; Márquez (yellow card) 63'; Biraghi (yellow card) 67' (yellow-red card) 86'; Ibáñez (yellow card) 78'; Rochina (yellow card) 85'	Stadium: Estadio Gran Canaria; Attendance: 18,932; Referee: Jaime Latre

3 January 2016 18	Granada	2–1	Sevilla	Granada
16:00 CET (UTC+01:00)	Success 17', (yellow card) 89'; Peñaranda 37'; Édgar (yellow card) 43'	Report	Vitolo 45+1'; Rami (yellow card) 56' (yellow-red card) 86'; Mariano (yellow card) 59'	Stadium: Los Cármenes; Attendance: 13,469; Referee: Undiano Mallenco

9 January 2016 19	Barcelona	4–0	Granada	Barcelona
16:00 CET (UTC+01:00)	Messi 8', 14', 58'; Vidal (yellow card) 63'; Neymar 83'	Report	Rochina (yellow card) 29'; Méndez (yellow card) 56'; Lombán (yellow card) 57'; Dória (yellow card) 60'	Stadium: Camp Nou; Attendance: 70,720; Referee: Carlos Velasco Carballo

18 January 2016 20	Eibar	5–1	Granada	Eibar
20:30 CET (UTC+01:00)	Capa (yellow card) 22'; Inui 35'; Enrich 38', 68'; Borja 74', 79'	Report	Pérez (yellow card) 9'; Uche (yellow card) 10'; Peñaranda (yellow card) 14'; El-Arabi 65'; Biraghi (yellow card) 86'	Stadium: Ipurua; Referee: José María Sánchez Martínez

23 January 2016 21	Granada	3–2	Getafe	Granada
20:30 CET (UTC+01:00)	Rico 27', (yellow card) 77'; El-Arabi 36'; Kelava (yellow card) 76'; Rochina 77', (yellow card) 79'	Report	Šćepović 71', (yellow card) 89'; Gómez 74'; Wanderson (yellow card) 81'; Lacen (yellow card) 89'	Stadium: Los Cármenes; Attendance: 15,448; Referee: Ricardo de Burgos Bengoetxea

30 January 2016 22	Villarreal	1–0	Granada	Villarreal
20:30 CET (UTC+01:00)	Costa (yellow card) 8'; Bruno 55' (pen.); Mario (yellow card) 85'; Castillejo (yellow card) 89'	Report	Rico (yellow card) 11'; Lombán (yellow card) 16'; Babin (yellow card) 54'	Stadium: El Madrigal; Referee: Carlos del Cerro Grande

7 February 2016 23	Granada	1–2	Real Madrid	Granada
20:30 CET (UTC+01:00)	Lopes (yellow card) 19'; Pérez (yellow card) 32'; El-Arabi 60', (yellow card) 61'	Report	Benzema 30'; Ramos (yellow card) 62'; Carvajal (yellow card) 83'; Modrić 85'	Stadium: Nuevo Los Cármenes; Attendance: 17,052; Referee: Jesús Gil Manzano

14 February 2016 24	Real Sociedad	3–0	Granada	San Sebastián
12:00 (UTC+1)	Oyarzabal 21', 61'; Jonathas 45'	Report	Foulquier (yellow card) 18'; Doucouré (yellow card) 85'	Stadium: Anoeta; Attendance: 19,591; Referee: José Luis González González

21 February 2016 25	Granada	1–2	Valencia	Granada
18:15 CET (UTC+01:00)	Pérez (yellow card) 52'; Success (yellow card) 86'; Édgar 90+3'	Report	Parejo (yellow card) 22', (goal) 55'; Cancelo (yellow card) 84'; Alves (yellow card) 86'; Mina 90'	Stadium: Los Cármenes; Attendance: 14,197; Referee: Iñaki Vicandi Garrido

28 February 2016 26	Deportivo	0–1	Granada	A Coruña
18:00 CET (UTC+01:00)	Juanfran (yellow card) 23'; Navarro (yellow card) 32'; Lux (red card) 90+3'	Report	El-Arabi 24' (pen.); Édgar (yellow card) 85'; Costa (yellow card) 88'; Fernández (yellow card) 90+3'	Stadium: Riazor; Attendance: 23,616; Referee: Juan Martínez Munuera

3 March 2016 27	Granada	2–0	Sporting Gijón	Granada
20:00	Costa (yellow card) 33'; Lopes (yellow card) 47'; Peñaranda (yellow card) 67'; El-Arabi 72' (pen.), (yellow card) 90'; Babin (yellow card) 85'; Pérez (yellow card) 90+2'; Success 90+3', (yellow card) 90+4'	Report	Meré (yellow card) 15'; Lora (yellow card) 24'; Mascarell (yellow card) 45+1'; Álvarez (yellow card) 78' (yellow-red card) 84'	Stadium: Nuevo Los Cármenes; Attendance: 15,441; Referee: Estrada Fernández

3 March 2016 28	Real Betis	2–0	Granada	Seville
20:00 (UTC+1)	Pezzella (yellow card) 12'; Vargas (yellow card) 41' (yellow-red card) 53'; Bruno (yellow card) 71'; Molina (yellow card) 79'; N'Diaye 85'; Castro 90+5'	Report	Peñaranda (yellow card) 20'; Pérez (yellow card) 40'; Success (yellow card) 47'; Lopes (yellow card) 47'; Barral (yellow card) 69'; Costa (yellow card) 76'; Rochina (yellow card) 87'; Fernández (red card) 90+3'	Stadium: Benito Villamarín; Attendance: 43,174; Referee: Iglesias Villanueva

13 March 2016 29	Granada	1–1	Espanyol	Granada
20:30 CET (UTC+01:00)	Barral (yellow card) 5' (yellow-red card) 28'; Rochina 40', (yellow card) 79'; Biraghi (yellow card) 45'; Lombán (yellow card) 54'; Fernández (yellow card) 80'; Pérez (yellow card) 89'	Report	Ó. Duarte (yellow card) 50'; R. Duarte (yellow card) 58'; Pérez (yellow card) 68'; Lopes 82' (o.g.)	Stadium: Los Cármenes; Attendance: 15,213; Referee: José Luis González González

19 March 2016 30	Granada	2–2	Rayo Vallecano	Granada
18:15 (UTC+1)	El-Arabi 11', 54' (pen.); Success (yellow card) 17' (yellow-red card) 70'; Costa (yellow card) 84'	Report	Crespo (yellow card) 24'; Quini (yellow card) 38'; Hernández 45'; Juan Carlos (yellow card) 52'; Castro (yellow card) 78', (goal) 87'; Embarba (yellow card) 90'	Stadium: Los Cármenes; Attendance: 18,848; Referee: Hernández Hernández

3 April 2016 31	Athletic Bilbao	1–1	Granada	Bilbao
12:00 (UTC+1)	Aduriz (yellow card) 17'; Lekue 28'; Gurpegui (yellow card) 48'	Report	Foulquier (yellow card) 26'; Pérez (yellow card) 41'; Lombán (yellow card) 44'; Peñaranda (yellow card) 46', (goal) 77'; Rico (yellow card) 86'	Stadium: San Mamés; Attendance: 40,497; Referee: Carlos Velasco Carballo

9 April 2016 32	Granada	0–0	Málaga	Granada
20:30 (UTC+1)	Success (yellow card) 89'	Report	Albentosa (yellow card) 20'; Ricca (yellow card) 49'; Rosales (yellow card) 90+2'	Stadium: Los Cármenes; Attendance: 18,979; Referee: Estrada Fernández

17 April 2016 33	Atlético Madrid	3–0	Granada	Madrid
16:00 CEST (UTC+02:00)	Koke 15'; Gabi (yellow card) 50'; Torres 59'; Fernández (yellow card) 81'; Correa 83'; Óliver (yellow card) 88'	Report	Doucouré (yellow card) 28'; Peñaranda (yellow card) 38'; Biraghi (yellow card) 46'; Barral (yellow card) 73'; Rochina (yellow card) 74'	Stadium: Vicente Calderón; Attendance: 47,656; Referee: Eduardo Prieto Iglesias

20 April 2016 34	Granada	5–1	Levante	Granada
20:45 CET (UTC+01:00)	Success 25'; El-Arabi 35' (pen.), 85' (pen.), 90', (yellow card) 86'; Rochina 44', (yellow card) 57'; Doucouré (yellow card) 58'; Biraghi (yellow card) 63'; Pérez (yellow card) 64'; Costa (yellow card) 89'	Report	Rossi (yellow card) 15'; Verza (yellow card) 34'; Deyverson (yellow card) 42'; Camarasa (yellow card) 84'; Mariño (yellow card) 85'; Simão Mate (yellow card) 85' (yellow-red card) 90'	Stadium: Los Cármenes; Attendance: 19,843; Referee: Santiago Jaime Latre

24 April 2016 35	Celta Vigo	2–1	Granada	Vigo
20:30 CET (UTC+01:00)	Aspas 16' (pen.), 76', (yellow card) 77'; Planas (yellow card) 70'	Report	Lopes (yellow card) 29'; El-Arabi 69'; Ibáñez (yellow card) 79'	Stadium: Balaídos; Attendance: 18,241; Referee: Jesús Gil Manzano

30 April 2016 36	Granada	3–2	Las Palmas	Granada
22:05 (UTC+1)	Rochina 13'; El-Arabi 22'; Peñaranda (yellow card) 52'; Costa 70', (yellow card) 72'; Pérez (yellow card) 75'	Report	Viera 3', 12'; Wakaso (yellow card) 20'; Tana (yellow card) 85'	Stadium: Los Cármenes; Attendance: 21,291; Referee: José Luis González González

8 May 2016 37	Sevilla	1–4	Granada	Seville
17:00 CEST (UTC+02:00)	Curro (yellow card) 40'; Kolodziejczak (yellow card) 58'; González 73'; Carriço (yellow card) 79'; Figueiras (yellow card) 85'	[www.laliga.es/directo/temporada-2015-2016/liga-bbva/37/sevilla_granada Report]	Doucouré (yellow card) 40'; Cuenca 45', 89'; Babin 79'; El-Arabi 86'	Stadium: Ramón Sánchez Pizjuán; Attendance: 21,915; Referee: Undiano Mallenco

14 May 2016 38	Granada	0–3	Barcelona	Granada
17:00 CEST (UTC+02:00)	Doucouré (yellow card) 54'; Pérez (yellow card) 62'; Rico (yellow card) 65'; Fernández (yellow card) 74'	Report	Busquets (yellow card) 19'; Suárez 22', 38', 86'; Piqué (yellow card) 74'	Stadium: Nuevo Los Cármenes; Attendance: 21,692; Referee: Alejandro Hernández

== See also ==
- 2015–16 La Liga
