= Mayola (name) =

- Pronunciation: MEY-OW-LAH
- Gender: Female
- Language: English

Origin
- Origin: Latin

Other names
- Nickname: May
- Related names: May

The name Mayola, a variant of the name 'May', is a female name which means 'born in the month of May'. The name 'May' derives from Maia, the name of a Roman goddess. The name could also refer to hawthorn flower that blossoms in the month of May. The month May is also known as 'Marian Month' for Roman Catholics which is dedicated to Mother Mary. The name is likely of a Latin origin. The name is very rare and unique in present times.

== As given name ==
- Mayola Biboko (born 1985), Congolese-Belgian footballer
- Mayola Williams, respondent in the US Supreme Court case in 2007 Philip Morris USA v. Williams

== As family name ==
- Freddy Mayola (born 1977), Cuban sprinter

== See also ==
- Maiola Kalili, American swimmer
- Mariola (disambiguation)
- Moyola (disambiguation)
- Myola
- Maloya
