= Uche Henry Agbo =

Nigerian footballer (born 1995)

Uche Agbo
Personal information
- Full name: Uche Henry Agbo
- Date of birth: 4 December 1995 (age 30)
- Place of birth: Kano, Nigeria
- Height: 1.85 m (6 ft 1 in)
- Positions: Defensive midfielder; centre-back

Team information
- Current team: Aktobe
- Number: 4

Youth career
- Bai Boys

Senior career*
Years	Team	Apps	(Gls)
2010–2011	Taraba	?	(1)
2011–2012	JUTH	?	(1)
2012–2013	Enyimba	1	(0)
2013–2016	Udinese	0	(0)
2014–2015	→ Granada B (loan)	57	(4)
2015–2016	→ Granada (loan)	7	(0)
2016–2017	Watford	0	(0)
2016–2017	→ Granada (loan)	31	(0)
2017–2020	Standard Liège	45	(1)
2019	→ Rayo Vallecano (loan)	6	(0)
2019	→ Braga (loan)	1	(0)
2020	→ Deportivo La Coruña (loan)	9	(0)
2020–2021	Deportivo La Coruña	18	(0)
2021–2023	Slovan Bratislava	40	(1)
2024–	Aktobe	37	(5)

International career^{‡}
2013	Nigeria U20	3	(0)
2017	Nigeria	1	(0)
- * Club domestic league appearances and goals as of 2 November 2025 ‡ National team caps and goals as of 22:14 21 May 2018 (UTC)

Uche Henry Agbo (born 4 December 1995) is a Nigerian professional footballer who plays as either a centre-back or a defensive midfielder for Kazakhstan Premier League club FC Aktobe.

== Club career ==
Born in Kano, Uche started playing for local lowly Bai Boys, and moved to Taraba in 2010. In May 2011 he signed for JUTH, and appeared regularly for the side, scoring once.

In January 2012 Uche joined Enyimba International along with teammate James Amankwei. He made his debut for the club on 28 April 2013, coming on as a second-half substitute in a 2–0 win against Dolphins.

In October 2013, Uche went on a trial at Udinese, signing a four-year deal in the following month. In March 2014 he moved to Granada CF, linking up with the Andalusians also until 2018 and being assigned to the reserves in Segunda División B.

On 23 February 2015, Uche made his first team – and La Liga – debut, replacing Javi Márquez in the dying minutes of a 2–1 away loss against Levante UD. On 25 July of the following year, he signed a five-year contract with Premier League club Watford, being immediately loaned back to Granada for one year.

On 11 July 2017, Uche joined Belgian club Standard de Liège. On 31 January 2019, he returned to Spain and its first division after agreeing to a six-month loan at Rayo Vallecano, with an option to buy. In doing so, he said that he had turned down a big-money move to China, as his career development was more important.

On 21 January 2020, after a six-month loan spell at S.C. Braga, Uche agreed to a deal with Deportivo de La Coruña, still owned by Standard.

On 1 September 2021, following mass exodus from La Coruña, Agbo was announced as a signing of reigning Slovak champions Slovan Bratislava on a three-year contract. His performance against Slovan from the Europa League was recalled in his introduction.

== International career ==
Uche got his first call up to the senior Nigeria side to replace the injured Leon Balogun for a 2018 FIFA World Cup qualifier against Zambia in October 2016. On 1 June 2017, he made his international debut for Nigeria in a 3–0 win against Togo in a friendly replacing Wilfred Ndidi.

Uche was included in Nigeria's preliminary 30-man squad for the 2018 FIFA World Cup in Russia, but he did not make the final 23-man squad.

== Career statistics ==
=== Club ===
As of match played 13 October 2023

Appearances and goals by club, season and competition
Club	Season	League			National Cup		League Cup		Continental		Other		Total	
Club	Season	Division	Apps	Goals	Apps	Goals	Apps	Goals	Apps	Goals	Apps	Goals	Apps	Goals
Granada B (loan)	2013–14	Segunda División B	4	1	—		—		—		—		4	1
Granada B (loan)	2014–15	Segunda División B	29	1	—		—		—		—		29	1
Granada B (loan)	2015–16	Segunda División B	24	2	—		—		—		—		24	2
Granada B (loan)	Total		57	4	0	0	0	0	0	0	0	0	57	4
Granada (loan)	2014–15	La Liga	1	0	0	0	—		—		—		1	0
Granada (loan)	2015–16	La Liga	6	0	4	0	—		—		—		10	0
Granada (loan)	2016–17	La Liga	31	0	1	0	—		—		—		32	0
Granada (loan)	Total		38	0	5	0	0	0	0	0	0	0	43	5
Standard Liège	2017–18	Belgian First Division A	35	1	5	0	—		6 (Note: Four appearances in UEFA Europa League, two appearances in UEFA Champions League)	0	—		46	1
Standard Liège	2018–19	Belgian First Division A	10	0	1	0	—		—		1 (Note: Appearance(s) in Belgian Super Cup)	0	12	0
Standard Liège	Total		45	1	6	0	0	0	6	0	1	0	58	1
Rayo Vallecano (loan)	2018–19	La Liga	6	0	0	0	—		—		—		6	0
Braga (loan)	2019–20	Primeira Liga	1	0	0	0	2	0	2 (Note: Appearance(s) in UEFA Europa League)	0	—		5	0
Deportivo La Coruña (loan)	2019–20	Segunda División	9	0	0	0	—		—		—		9	0
Deportivo La Coruña	2020–21	Segunda División B	14	0	1	0	—		—		—		15	0
Deportivo La Coruña	Total		23	0	1	0	0	0	0	0	0	0	24	0
Slovan Bratislava	2021–22	Slovak First League	20	0	4	1	—		6 (Note: Appearances in UEFA Europa Conference League)	0	—		30	1
Slovan Bratislava	2022–23	Slovak First League	16	1	5	0	—		10 (Note: 2 appearances in UEFA Champions League, 2 appearances in UEFA Europa League and 6 appearances in UEFA Europa Conference League)	0	—		31	1
Slovan Bratislava	2023–24	Slovak First League	2	0	0	0	—		0	0	—		2	0
Slovan Bratislava	Total		38	1	9	1	0	0	16	0	0	0	63	2
Slovan Bratislava II	2021–22	Slovak Second League	2	0	—		—		—		—		2	0
Slovan Bratislava II	2022–23	Slovak Second League	5	0	—		—		—		—		5	0
Slovan Bratislava II	2023–24	Slovak Second League	2	0	—		—		—		—		2	0
Slovan Bratislava II	Total		9	0	0	0	0	0	0	0	0	0	9	0
Career total			170	5	12	0	2	0	8	0	1	0	193	5

== Honours ==
Slovan Bratislava

- Fortuna Liga: 2021–22, 2022–23
