= Abdoulaye Diarra =

Abdoulaye Diarra may refer to:

- Abdoulaye Diarra (footballer, born 1986), Ivorian football midfielder
- Abdoulaye Diarra (footballer, born 1994), Malian football striker
- Oxmo Puccino (Abdoulaye Plea Diarra, born 1974), Malian-French rapper
