= Abdoulaye Diarra (footballer, born 1986) =

Ivorian footballer

Personal information
- Date of birth: 12 October 1986 (age 40)
- Place of birth: Divo, Ivory Coast
- Height: 1.74 m (5 ft 9 in)
- Position: Midfielder

Team information
- Current team: Vladimirescu (player-assistant)

Youth career
- 2001–2002: ACD Valnure
- 2002–2006: Inter Milan

Senior career*
Years	Team	Apps	(Gls)
2006–2007	Inter Milan	0	(0)
2007	→ Maribor (loan)	7	(0)
2007–2008	Maribor	1	(0)
2008–2010	Bohemians Prague	2	(0)
2008–2009	→ Viktorie Jirny (loan)		
2010–2011	UTA Arad	19	(0)
2011–2013	Bihor Oradea	23	(2)
2013–2014	UTA Arad	6	(0)
2014–2016	Millenium Giarmata		
2016–2018	Gloria LT Cermei		
2018–	Vladimirescu		

International career
2007	Ivory Coast U-23		
- * Club domestic league appearances and goals as of 22:33, 6 January 2025 (UTC)

Abdoulaye Diarra (born 12 October 1986) is an Ivorian footballer who currently plays as a midfielder for Liga IV side CS Vladimriescu. Diarra grew up at Inter Milan and played at senior level for Maribor, Bohemians Prague and Viktorie Jirny before moving in 2011 to Romania where he played in the second and third tier for UTA Arad, FC Bihor, Millenium Giarmata and Gloria Lunca-Teuz Cermei.

== Club career ==
=== Internazionale ===
At age 14, Diarra arrived in Italy. He began his career in Italy with Associazone Calcio Dilettanti Valnure Podenzano Vigolzone Bettola and was in July 2002 scouted from Internazionale. After five years with F.C. Internazionale Milano, in January 2007 on loan to NK Maribor until 30 June 2007 as part of Rene Krhin deal. He played at both legs of UEFA Intertoto Cup 2007 first round which is on 24 and 30 June.

As part of the deal of David Suazo, he was transferred to Cagliari in July 2007, along with Robert Acquafresca. Few weeks later he signed a 2-year deal with Maribor.

=== Bohemians Prague ===
On 1 July 2008 he was signed by Bohemians (Střížkov) Prague. In 2008–09 season he left on loan to SK Viktorie Jirny of Czech Republic Fourth Division Divize B (Group B), along with Mayola Biboko. He played two league match and 1 cup match before left on loan.

=== UTA ===
In September 2010 he was signed by UTA Arad.

== International career ==
He was call-up to Ivory Coast national under-23 football team in 2007.
