= Petr Pižanowski =

Czech footballer (born 1974)

Personal information
- Date of birth: 13 April 1974 (age 52)
- Place of birth: Olomouc, Czechoslovakia
- Position: Goalkeeper

Youth career
- 1984–1986: SK Chválkovice
- 1986–1993: Sigma Olomouc

Senior career*
Years	Team	Apps	(Gls)
1993–1999	Sigma Olomouc	51	(0)
1993–1994	→ Znojmo (loan)		
1999–2000	Jablonec	16	(0)
2000–2005	Viktoria Žižkov	120	(0)
2005–2006	Xanthi	45	(0)
2007–2009	Mladá Boleslav	6	(0)
2009–2012	Bohemians Prague	4	(0)
- * Club domestic league appearances and goals

Petr Pižanowski (born 13 April 1974) is a Czech former footballer who played as a goalkeeper.

== Life ==
Pižanowski was born on 13 April 1974 in Olomouc, Czechoslovakia. He was raised in Chválkovice part of Olomouc.

== Career ==
Pižanowski started his professional career in 1993 in SK Sigma Olomouc, but due to military service, he spent his first professional season in 1. SC Znojmo FK. In 1994, he returned to SK Sigma Olomouc. In 1999, he signed for FK Jablonec. In 2000, he signed for FK Viktoria Žižkov. In 2005, he signed for Greek side Xanthi FC. In 2007, he returned to the Czech Republic, playing in lower amateur competitions for SK Viktorie Jirny. In November 2007, he returned to professional football and signed for FK Mladá Boleslav. He was described as "stood above the others, showing his qualities". In 2009, he signed for Bohemians Prague. In 2012, he ended his professional career.

After retiring from professional football, he worked as a goalkeeper coach.
