= Jícha =

Jícha (Czech feminine: Jíchová) is a Czech surname. Notable people with the surname include:

- Filip Jícha (born 1982), Czech handballer
- Martin Jícha (born 1990), Czech footballer
- Nikoleta Jíchová (born 2000), Czech track and field athlete
