= Isaac Cuenca =

Spanish footballer (born 1991)

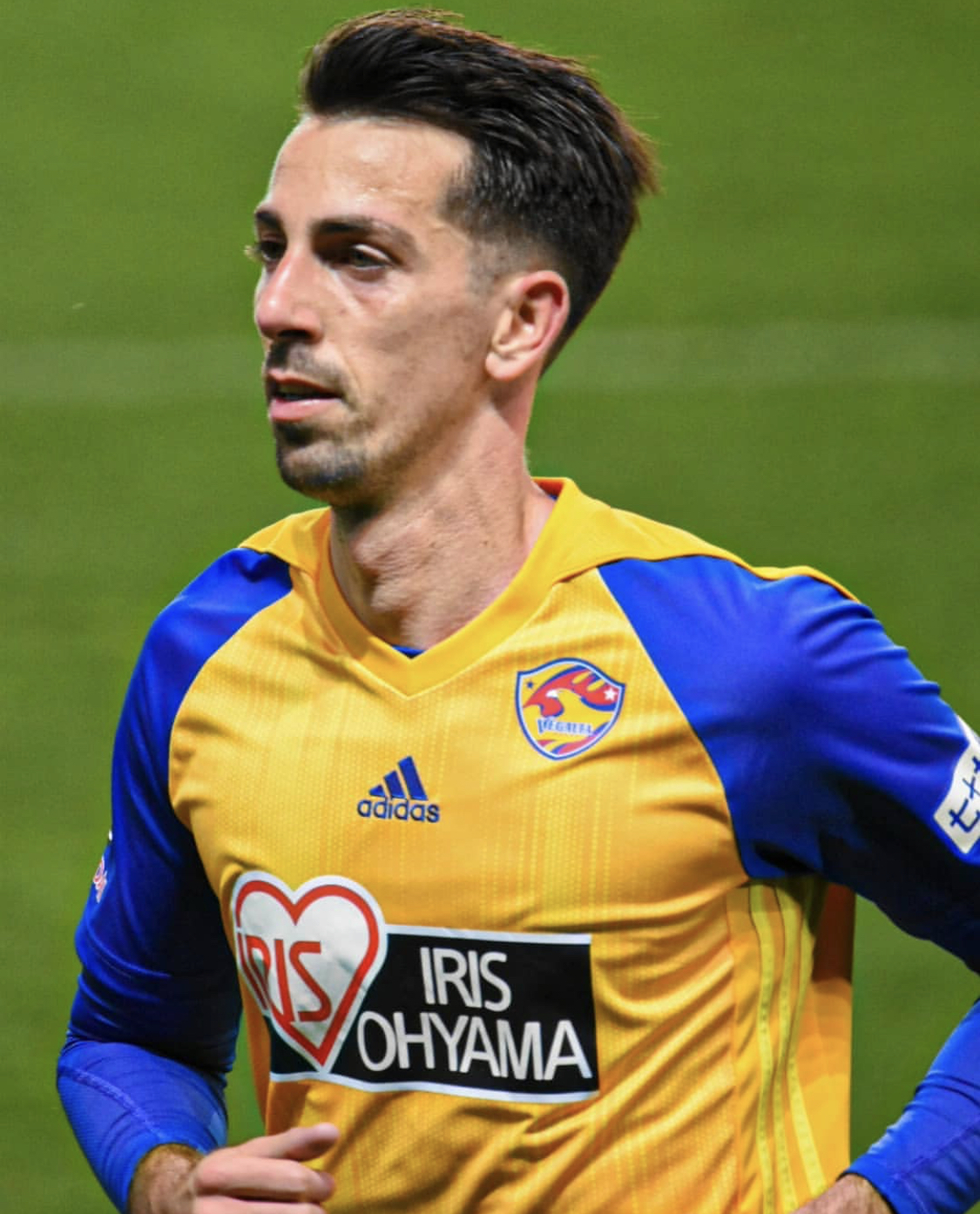
- Cuenca with Vegalta Sendai in 2020

Personal information
- Full name: Joan Isaac Cuenca López
- Date of birth: 27 April 1991 (age 35)
- Place of birth: Reus, Spain
- Height: 1.81 m (5 ft 11 in)
- Position: Winger

Youth career
- 1998–2001: Juroca
- 2001–2002: Espanyol
- 2002–2005: Barcelona
- 2005–2007: Santes Creus
- 2007–2008: Reus
- 2008–2009: Damm
- 2009–2010: Barcelona

Senior career*
Years	Team	Apps	(Gls)
2010–2012	Barcelona B	6	(2)
2010–2011	→ Sabadell (loan)	28	(4)
2011–2014	Barcelona	16	(2)
2013	→ Ajax (loan)	4	(0)
2014–2015	Deportivo La Coruña	27	(2)
2015–2016	Bursaspor	12	(1)
2016–2017	Granada	37	(4)
2017–2018	Hapoel Be'er Sheva	10	(2)
2019	Sagan Tosu	29	(6)
2020–2021	Vegalta Sendai	15	(0)
Total		183	(23)

International career
2011	Spain U21	2	(0)
2012	Spain U23	1	(0)
2011	Catalonia	1	(0)
- * Club domestic league appearances and goals

Joan Isaac Cuenca López (born 27 April 1991) is a Spanish former professional footballer who played as a winger.

Formed at Barcelona, where he made 30 total appearances, he also represented Deportivo and Granada in La Liga, additionally playing top-flight football in the Netherlands, Turkey, Israel and Japan.

== Club career ==
=== Early years ===
Born in Reus, Tarragona, Catalonia, Cuenca began playing football with local Unió Barri Juroca, going on to have spells with RCD Espanyol, FC Barcelona, UE Barri Santes Creus, CF Reus Deportiu and CF Damm before return to La Masia in 2009. He made his senior debut in the 2010–11 season, being loaned to another club in his native region, CE Sabadell FC of the Segunda División B; he made an immediate impact, starting in 24 of his appearances and totalling 2,288 minutes as the Arlequinats returned to Segunda División after an 18-year absence.

In July 2011, Cuenca returned to Barcelona and joined its B team, alongside Martí Riverola. Shortly after, he was called by first-team manager Pep Guardiola to the preseason, and made his debut on 23 July against HNK Hajduk Split.

=== Barcelona ===
Cuenca made his official debut for Barça B on 4 September 2011, playing the last 29 minutes in a 4–0 away win against FC Cartagena and scoring the last goal of the match. On 19 October he made his first official appearance for the main squad, coming on as a substitute for David Villa in the dying minutes of the 2–0 home victory over FC Viktoria Plzeň in the group stage of the UEFA Champions League.

On 25 October 2011, after another game on the bench, Cuenca made his La Liga debut, playing the full 90 minutes and being booked in a 1–0 away defeat of Granada CF. Four days later, again as a starter, he scored in a 5–0 home rout of RCD Mallorca, assisted by Adriano.

On 3 December 2011, Cuenca netted his second league goal, playing the entire 5–0 home win over Levante UD. On 31 January 2012 he signed a contract extension, keeping him at the club until June 2015, and also switched permanently to the first team.

Cuenca spent the first half of 2012–13 nursing a knee injury. On 31 January 2013, he was loaned to Eredivisie side AFC Ajax until 30 June. He was given the number 11 shirt, which was previously worn by Lorenzo Ebecilio; that jersey, however, was reserved for league and Dutch Cup matches, while he wore number 28 in the team run in the UEFA Europa League, as Ebecilio had already made continental appearances with the club wearing the former number during the campaign.

Cuenca made his debut for his new team 10 February 2013, against Roda JC Kerkrade at the Amsterdam Arena, assisting Daley Blind in his first ever goal for Ajax as the match ended in a 1–1 draw. However, in March, he suffered another knee injury, being sidelined for a further four months; he underwent surgery in early June, returning to training in October.

=== Deportivo ===
On 9 July 2014, Cuenca and Barcelona reached an agreement to terminate the player's contract, due to expire in June 2015, due to technical reasons. Later that day, he signed a one-year deal with Deportivo de La Coruña in the same league.

Cuenca made his debut for the club on 23 August 2014, replacing Toché in a 2–1 away loss to Granada, and scored his first goal eight days later, a last-minute equaliser in the 2–2 home draw against Rayo Vallecano. The Galicians went on to narrowly avoid relegation, with him starting in 14 of his appearances.

=== Later career ===
On 7 August 2015, Cuenca signed a three-year deal with Turkish Süper Lig side Bursaspor. He scored his first competitive goal on 28 October, the game's only in a victory over Sivasspor at the Bursa Atatürk Stadium.

On 1 February 2016, Cuenca returned to his country and signed with Granada until the end of the season. In June 2017, after the Andalusians' relegation, he joined Israeli Premier League champions Hapoel Be'er Sheva F.C. on a two-year contract. He won the league in his only year in the Middle East, though he was not a regular part of manager Barak Bakhar's plans.

Cuenca returned to his first senior club Reus ahead of the 2018–19 campaign. After playing the whole preseason on trial, he could not be registered; Reus claimed that the Liga Nacional de Fútbol Profesional rejected his registration due to his low salary, while the organisation claimed that the club had breached the wage limits.

In January 2019, Cuenca went back abroad and signed a three-year contract with the option of a fourth at Sagan Tosu in Japan's J1 League. He joined compatriots Fernando Torres and Lluís Carreras, his teammate and manager respectively.

For the following year, Cuenca joined Vegalta Sendai in the same competition. In February 2020, he suffered a right knee meniscus injury that ruled him out for six months. He rescinded his contract in April 2021 to return home for treatment.

== International career ==
Cuenca had his first international call-up in November 2011, when Spain under-21 manager Luis Milla named him in a 20-man squad for European qualifiers against Estonia and Switzerland. He made his debut against the former on the 10th at the Estadio Álvarez Claro in Melilla, starting in a 6–0 win.

On 30 December the same year, Cuenca earned his only cap for the non-FIFA Catalonia side, in a goalless draw against Tunisia for the Catalonia International Trophy.

== Style of play ==
Cuenca was capable of playing as a winger on either flank, being likened to former Barcelona teammate Pedro. A 2011 Bleacher Report profile described him as a promising young prospect, with good all-round abilities and above average dribbling skills, noting that his strengths were his tactical intelligence, technique and positioning, while his weaknesses were his defensive work-rate, physique, ability in the air and lack of end product or "killer instinct."

== Career statistics ==
Appearances and goals by club, season and competition
Club	Season	League			National cup (Note: Includes Copa del Rey, Turkish Cup, Israel State Cup)		League cup (Note: Includes Toto Cup, J.League Cup)		Continental		Other		Total	
Club	Season	Division	Apps	Goals	Apps	Goals	Apps	Goals	Apps	Goals	Apps	Goals	Apps	Goals
Sabadell (loan)	2010–11	Segunda División B	28	4	—		—		—		4 (Note: Appearances in Segunda División B play-offs)	1	32	5
Barcelona B	2011–12	Segunda División	6	2	—		—		—		—		6	2
Barcelona	2011–12	La Liga	16	2	6	2	—		7 (Note: Appearances in UEFA Champions League)	0	1 (Note: Appearance in FIFA Club World Cup)	0	30	4
Barcelona	2013–14	La Liga	0	0	0	0	—		0	0	0	0	0	0
Barcelona	Total		16	2	6	2	—		7	0	1	0	30	4
Ajax (loan)	2012–13	Eredivisie	3	0	0	0	—		2 (Note: Appearances in UEFA Europa League)	0	0	0	5	0
Deportivo La Coruña	2014–15	La Liga	27	2	2	0	—		—		—		29	2
Bursaspor	2015–16	Süper Lig	12	1	7	0	—		—		—		19	1
Granada	2015–16	La Liga	12	2	0	0	—		—		—		12	2
Granada	2016–17	La Liga	25	2	1	0	—		—		—		26	2
Granada	Total		37	4	1	0	—		—		—		38	4
Hapoel Be'er Sheva	2017–18	Israeli Premier League	10	2	2	0	2	0	6 (Note: One appearances in UEFA Champions League, five appearances and one goal in UEFA Europa League)	1	—		20	3
Sagan Tosu	2019	J1 League	29	6	0	0	3	0	—		—		32	6
Vegalta Sendai	2020	J1 League	15	0	0	0	0	0	—		—		15	0
Career total			183	23	18	2	5	0	15	1	5	1	226	27

== Honours ==
Barcelona

- Copa del Rey: 2011–12
- FIFA Club World Cup: 2011

Ajax

- Eredivisie: 2012–13

Hapoel Be'er Sheva

- Israeli Premier League: 2017–18
