= Héctor Hernández (footballer, born 1991) =

Spanish footballer

Personal information
- Full name: Héctor Hernández Ortega
- Date of birth: 23 May 1991 (age 35)
- Place of birth: Valladolid, Spain
- Height: 1.73 m (5 ft 8 in)
- Position: Left-back

Youth career
- 2003–2008: Victoria Valladolid
- 2008–2009: Betis Valladolid
- 2009–2010: Zaragoza

Senior career*
| Years | Team | Apps | (Gls) |
| 2010–2013 | Zaragoza B | 69 | (2) |
| 2013 | Zaragoza | 1 | (0) |
| 2013–2015 | Real Sociedad B | 42 | (2) |
| 2015–2018 | Real Sociedad | 17 | (0) |
| 2017 | → Granada (loan) | 13 | (0) |
| 2017–2018 | → Alavés (loan) | 1 | (0) |
| 2018–2019 | Tenerife | 15 | (0) |
| 2019–2020 | Numancia | 31 | (0) |
| 2020–2022 | Deportivo La Coruña | 43 | (1) |
| 2023 | Rayo Majadahonda | 11 | (0) |
| 2024–2025 | Pontevedra | 21 | (0) |
| 2025–2026 | Palencia | 3 | (0) |
- * Club domestic league appearances and goals as of 20:07, 26 December 2025 (UTC)

Héctor Hernández Ortega (born 23 May 1991), sometimes known as Litri, is a Spanish professional footballer who plays as a left-back.

== Club career ==
Born in Valladolid, Castile and León, Hernández finished his development with Real Zaragoza after previous stints at CD Victoria CF and CD Betis de Valladolid CF. He made his debut as a senior with the reserves in the 2010–11 season, in the Tercera División.

Hernández made his first-team debut on 23 January 2013, coming on as a second-half substitute for Víctor Rodríguez in a 4–0 away loss against Sevilla FC in the quarter-finals of the Copa del Rey. He first appeared in La Liga on 10 February, starting and being sent off in the 1–2 home defeat to Real Sociedad.

On 15 July 2013, Hernández moved to another reserve team, Real Sociedad B from Segunda División B. He signed a new two-year contract with the club on 13 May 2015, being promoted to the main squad on 20 August.

Hernández made his competitive debut for the Txuri-urdin on 28 November 2015, replacing Imanol Agirretxe in a 4–0 loss at FC Barcelona. On 18 June of the following year, he agreed to a two-year extension until 2019.

On 30 January 2017, Hernández was loaned to fellow top-flight side Granada CF until June. On 17 February, he was the only national player fielded by manager Lucas Alcaraz in a 4–1 home win over Real Betis as the Nazaríes lined up with 11 different nationalities.

On 11 June 2017, Hernández joined Deportivo Alavés of the same league on loan for one year. Having totalled just 15 minutes due to a serious knee injury, he terminated his contract with Real on 30 August 2018 and signed with Segunda División's CD Tenerife just hours later.

On 15 July 2019, Hernández joined CD Numancia. On 12 September 2020, after suffering relegation, he signed a two-year deal with Deportivo de La Coruña, also relegated to division three.

Hernández remained in the lower leagues subsequently, with CF Rayo Majadahonda and Pontevedra CF.

== Career statistics ==
As of match played 2 May 2021

Appearances and goals by club, season and competition
| Club | Season | League | | | National Cup | | Other | | Total | |
| Club | Season | Division | Apps | Goals | Apps | Goals | Apps | Goals | Apps | Goals |
|---|---|---|---|---|---|---|---|---|---|---|
| Zaragoza B | 2010–11 | Tercera División | ? | ? | — | | — | | ? | ? |
| Zaragoza B | 2011–12 | Segunda División B | 14 | 1 | — | | — | | 14 | 1 |
| Zaragoza B | 2012–13 | Segunda División B | 31 | 1 | — | | 2 (Note: Appearances in Segunda División B play-offs) | 0 | 33 | 1 |
| Zaragoza B | Total | | ? | ? | 0 | 0 | ? | ? | ? | ? |
| Zaragoza | 2012–13 | La Liga | 1 | 0 | 1 | 0 | — | | 2 | 0 |
| Real Sociedad B | 2013–14 | Segunda División B | 7 | 0 | — | | — | | 7 | 0 |
| Real Sociedad B | 2014–15 | Segunda División B | 35 | 2 | — | | — | | 35 | 2 |
| Real Sociedad B | Total | | 42 | 2 | 0 | 0 | 0 | 0 | 42 | 2 |
| Real Sociedad | 2015–16 | La Liga | 13 | 0 | 1 | 0 | — | | 14 | 0 |
| Real Sociedad | 2016–17 | La Liga | 4 | 0 | 0 | 0 | — | | 4 | 0 |
| Real Sociedad | Total | | 17 | 0 | 1 | 0 | 0 | 0 | 18 | 0 |
| Granada (loan) | 2016–17 | La Liga | 13 | 0 | 0 | 0 | — | | 13 | 0 |
| Alavés (loan) | 2017–18 | La Liga | 1 | 0 | 0 | 0 | — | | 1 | 0 |
| Tenerife | 2018–19 | Segunda División | 15 | 0 | 1 | 0 | — | | 16 | 0 |
| Numancia | 2019–20 | Segunda División | 31 | 0 | 0 | 0 | — | | 31 | 0 |
| Deportivo La Coruña | 2020–21 | Segunda División B | 12 | 1 | 2 | 1 | — | | 14 | 2 |
| Career total | | | 177 | 5 | 5 | 1 | 2 | 0 | 184 | 6 |
