= Dimitri Foulquier =

Guadeloupean footballer (born 1993)

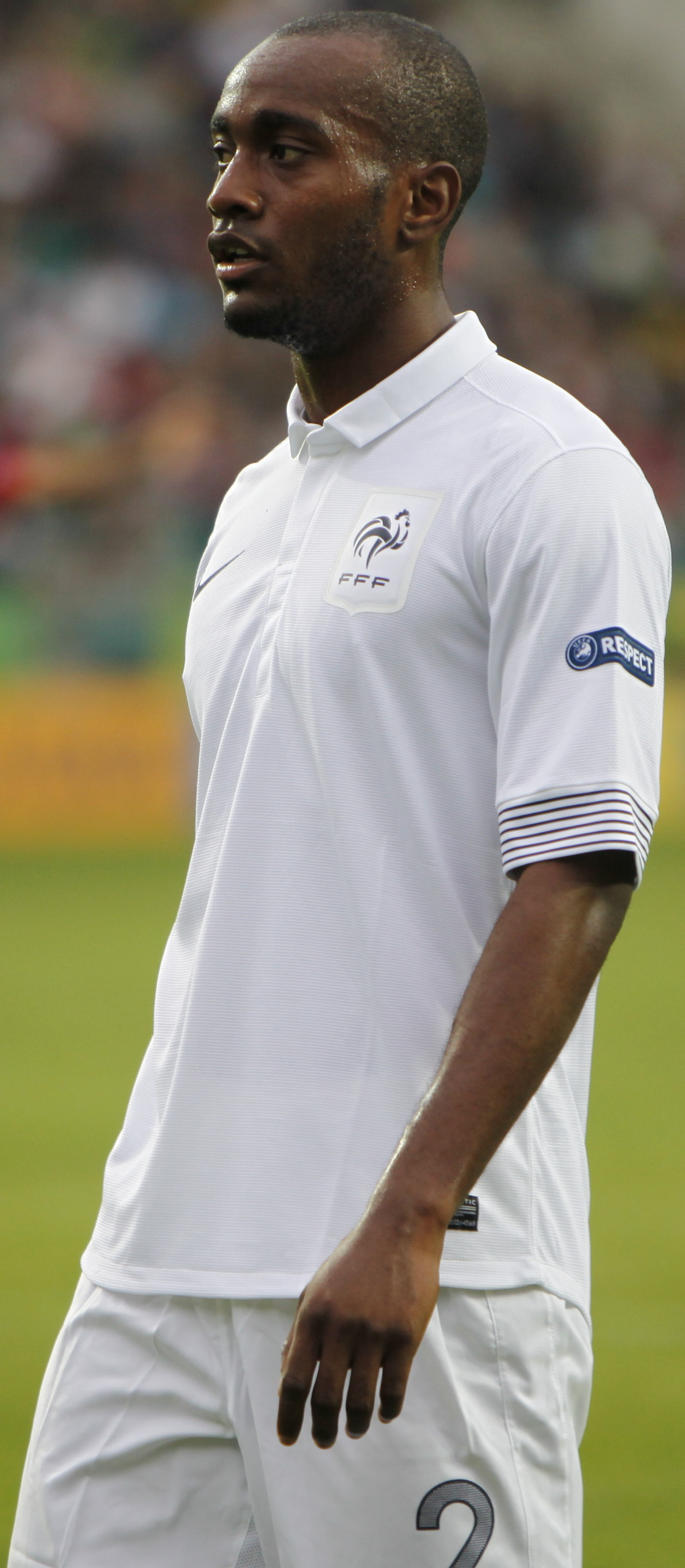
- Foulquier with France U19 in 2012

Personal information
- Full name: Dimitri Christophe Foulquier
- Date of birth: 23 March 1993 (age 33)
- Place of birth: Sarcelles, France
- Height: 1.83 m (6 ft 0 in)
- Position: Right back

Team information
- Current team: Valencia
- Number: 20

Youth career
- 2000–2001: Capesterre Belle-Eau
- 2001–2007: Marquisat Capesterre
- 2007–2011: Rennes

Senior career*
Years	Team	Apps	(Gls)
2011–2013	Rennes B	19	(1)
2011–2013	Rennes	19	(0)
2013–2017	Granada	92	(1)
2017–2020	Watford	3	(0)
2017–2018	→ Strasbourg (loan)	16	(0)
2018–2019	→ Getafe (loan)	25	(3)
2020	→ Granada (loan)	17	(1)
2020–2021	Granada	34	(0)
2021–	Valencia	139	(0)

International career^{‡}
2010–2011	France U18	7	(0)
2011–2012	France U19	10	(1)
2012–2013	France U20	13	(0)
2013–2014	France U21	13	(0)
2018–	Guadeloupe	2	(0)
Medal record
Representing France
Men's football
FIFA U-20 World Cup
Winner	2013 Turkey
- * Club domestic league appearances and goals as of 27 May 2026 ‡ National team caps and goals as of 25 May 2023

Dimitri Christophe Foulquier (born 23 March 1993) is a professional footballer who plays as a right back for La Liga club Valencia. Born in metropolitan France, he plays for the Guadeloupe national team.

He spent most of his career in Spain, playing in La Liga for Granada, Getafe and Valencia, having also played in Ligue 1 for Rennes and Strasbourg. He also made three Premier League appearances for Watford.

Foulquier previously represented France up to the under-21 team, before switching to represent Guadeloupe at senior international level.

== Club career ==
=== Rennes ===
Born in Sarcelles, Île-de-France, Foulquier was raised in Capesterre, a commune in the overseas region and department of Guadeloupe. After excelling with local clubs in the commune, he was spotted by Rennes scout Patrick Rampillon and, subsequently, joined the professional club in July 2007.

Foulquier was awarded the Best Academy Player award for the 2009–10 season. After appearing on the bench in matches during the 2010–11 season, he was promoted to the senior team by manager Frédéric Antonetti for the 2011–12 season. He was assigned the number 24 shirt and made his professional debut on 2 October 2011 in a league match against Lille, starting but being replaced at half-time in a 2–0 away loss. He made 22 total appearances, including his UEFA Europa League debut in a 3–1 loss at Atlético Madrid on 15 December, and was sent off on 11 May 2013 in a 4–1 loss at Valenciennes for two yellow cards in the space of three minutes.

=== Granada ===
On 27 August 2013, Foulquier was loaned to La Liga side Granada. He made his debut in the competition on 30 September, replacing Michael Pereira in a 2–0 home win against Athletic Bilbao.

On 25 May 2014, the Andalusians bought Foulquier outright, for a €2 million fee, with the player signing a five-year deal. He scored the only goal of his spell on 24 October 2015, in the third minute of a 1–1 draw with Real Betis at the Nuevo Estadio de Los Cármenes.

=== Watford ===
Foulquier signed for Watford on 25 August 2017, with the club also being owned by the Pozzo family. He was immediately loaned back to his birth country's top league, joining Strasbourg for the season. The early part of his spell was affected by injury.

On 23 August 2018, Foulquier returned to Spain and its first division after agreeing to a one-year loan deal with Getafe. He played 25 times in a 5th-place season that secured Europa League qualification, scoring in consecutive wins at Rayo Vallecano and at home to Betis in October.

Foulquier made his Watford debut on 27 August 2019 in the second round of the EFL Cup, a 3–0 home win over Coventry City. On 21 September he made his Premier League bow, being replaced by Roberto Pereyra after 33 minutes of an 8–0 loss at reigning champions Manchester City; it was 5–0 after 18 minutes.

=== Granada return ===
On 2 January 2020, Foulquier returned to Granada on loan for the rest of the season with the option to buy. He played regularly as the campaign ended in 7th place and European qualification, and scored in a 3–0 win at Osasuna on 23 February. His move was made permanent through a buying option on 24 July, signing him to a three-year contract.

=== Valencia ===
On 30 August 2021, Foulquier signed a four-year deal with Valencia, also in the top tier, for a fee of €2.5 million. He made seven appearances as they finished runners-up in the Copa del Rey, being substituted for Yunus Musah in the 100th minute of the final 1–1 draw with Betis in which his replacement was the only one to miss in the penalty shootout.

== International career ==
Foulquier was a France youth international, having represented his country at under-18 through under-21 levels, including winning the 2013 FIFA U-20 World Cup, in which he scored in the penalty shoot-out in the final against Uruguay.

Foulquier was called up to the Guadeloupe national team for CONCACAF Nations League match against Curaçao on 19 November 2018. He made his debut as a starter in that game, which Guadeloupe lost 6–0.

== Career statistics ==
=== Club ===
As of match played 17 August 2024

Appearances and goals by club, season and competition
Club	Season	League			National cup (Note: Includes Coupe de France, Copa del Rey)		League cup (Note: Includes Coupe de la Ligue, EFL Cup)		Europe		Other		Total	
Club	Season	Division	Apps	Goals	Apps	Goals	Apps	Goals	Apps	Goals	Apps	Goals	Apps	Goals
Rennes	2011–12	Ligue 1	2	0	0	0	0	0	1 (Note: Appearance(s) in UEFA Europa League)	0	—		3	0
Rennes	2012–13	Ligue 1	15	0	0	0	2	0	—		—		17	0
Rennes	2013–14	Ligue 1	2	0	0	0	0	0	—		—		2	0
Rennes	Total		19	0	0	0	2	0	1	0	0	0	22	0
Granada	2013–14	La Liga	24	0	1	0	—		—		—		25	0
Granada	2014–15	La Liga	25	0	2	0	—		—		—		27	0
Granada	2015–16	La Liga	21	1	3	0	—		—		—		24	1
Granada	2016–17	La Liga	22	0	0	0	—		—		—		22	0
Granada	Total		92	1	6	0	0	0	0	0	0	0	98	1
Watford	2019–20	Premier League	3	0	0	0	2	0	—		—		5	0
Strasbourg (loan)	2017–18	Ligue 1	16	0	2	0	1	0	–		—		19	0
Getafe (loan)	2018–19	La Liga	25	3	4	0	—		—		—		29	3
Granada (loan)	2019–20	La Liga	17	1	5	0	—		—		—		22	1
Granada	2020–21	La Liga	32	0	4	1	—		10	0	—		46	1
Valencia	2021–22	La Liga	29	0	7	0	—		—		—		36	0
Valencia	2022–23	La Liga	30	0	2	0	—		—		1 (Note: Appearance in Supercopa de España)	0	33	0
Valencia	2023–24	La Liga	33	0	1	0	—		—		—		34	0
Valencia	2024–25	La Liga	13	0	0	0	—		—		—		1	0
Valencia	Total		105	0	10	0	0	0	0	0	1	0	116	0
Career total			309	5	31	1	5	0	11	0	1	0	357	6

== Honours ==
France U20

- FIFA U-20 World Cup: 2013

Individual

- UEFA European Under-19 Championship Team of the Tournament: 2012
