= Mayola Biboko =

Congolese-Belgian footballer

Personal information
- Date of birth: 22 March 1985 (age 41)
- Place of birth: N'dalatando, Angola
- Height: 1.88 m (6 ft 2 in)
- Position: Forward

Team information
- Current team: RCS Verviétois
- Number: 5

Youth career
- Pierreuse

Senior career*
Years	Team	Apps	(Gls)
2004–2008	Visé	14+	(2+)
2006	→ Spa (loan)	?	(?)
2006–2007	→ Bas-Oha (loan)	?	(?)
2008–2010	Bohemians Střížkov	6	(0)
2008–2009	→ Viktorie Jirny (loan)	1	(1)
2010–2011	FCM Young Boys Diekirch	3	(0)
2011–2012	RFC Seraing	16	(8)
2012–	RCS Verviétois	46	(5)
- * Club domestic league appearances and goals as of 10 November 2013

Mayola Biboko (born 22 March 1985) is a Congolese-Belgian footballer. He was born in N'dalatando, Cuanza Norte.

== Career ==
=== Belgium ===
Biboko began his career with "Le Club Social" in Liège He then left for JS Pierreuse and played with players likes Rachid Tiberkanine.

He then played for C.S. Visé (or spells as Wezet) and scored 2 goals in 13 appearances in 2004-05 Belgian Second Division season. The club then relegated. He played once in 2005–06 season and was left on loan to Royal Spa F.C. in January 2006, then R.U.S. Bas–Oha in 2006–07 season. Biboko returned to Visé in 2007–08 season. and was released by Visé in the summer 2008.

=== Czech Republic ===
On 10 July 2008 sold to Bohemians Střížkov. He played only five league matches in his first season before going on loan to SK Viktorie Jirny of Czech Republic Fourth Division Divize B (Group B) along with Abdoulaye Diarra during the season. He scored a goal against FK Teplice B.

He then returned to Bohemians and played once in March 2009, a 1–1 draw with 1. FC Brno. He replaced Stanley Ibe in the last minutes.

=== Luxembourg ===
As of first half of 2009–10 season, he played for Bohemians Střížkov and joined in summer 2010 to FCM Young Boys Diekirch.

=== Return to Belgium ===
After one season was released by FCM Young Boys Diekirch and he returned to Belgium, who signed now with RFC Seraing. Biboko played a year with the club from Liége, before signed for RCS Verviétois.

=== Position ===
It was reported Biboko can also plays defender role but his usual position is forward.
