= Martin Jícha =

Czech footballer

Martin Jicha
Personal information
- Date of birth: 15 August 1990 (age 36)
- Place of birth: Czech Republic
- Height: 1.91 m (6 ft 3 in)
- Position: Goalkeeper

Senior career*
Years	Team	Apps	(Gls)
2010	FC Sellier & Bellot Vlašim	4	(0)
2011	UB Conquense	0	(0)
2012–2013	CSM Ceahlăul Piatra Neamț	1	(0)
2014–2015	SK Viktorie Jirny		
2015–2016	FK Chmel Blšany		
2016–	FSC Stará Říše		
- * Club domestic league appearances and goals

Martin Jicha (born 15 August 1990 in the Czech Republic) is a Czech footballer who plays for FSC Stará Říše in his home country.

== Career ==
Jicha started his senior career with Sellier & Bellot Vlašim in the Czech National Football League, where he made four league appearances and scored zero goals. After that, he played for UB Conquense and CSM Ceahlăul Piatra Neamț in the Romanian Liga I, where he made one league appearance and scored zero goals.
