= Isaac Success =

Nigerian footballer (born 1996)

Personal information
- Full name: Isaac Success Ajayi
- Date of birth: 7 January 1996 (age 30)
- Place of birth: Benin City, Nigeria
- Height: 1.86 m (6 ft 1 in)
- Position: Forward

Youth career
- BJ Foundation

Senior career*
Years	Team	Apps	(Gls)
2014–2015	Granada B	20	(9)
2014–2016	Granada	49	(7)
2016–2021	Watford	64	(3)
2018	→ Málaga (loan)	9	(0)
2021–2024	Udinese	79	(4)
2024–2025	Al Wasl	0	(0)
2025–2026	Al Ta'awon	14	(6)
2026–	Al-Bukiryah	1	(0)

International career
2013	Nigeria U17	7	(7)
2015–2016	Nigeria U20	4	(2)
2017–2022	Nigeria	4	(0)
- * Club domestic league appearances and goals as of 20 September 2026

Isaac Success Ajayi (born 7 January 1996) is a Nigerian professional footballer who plays as a forward. He is currently a free agent.

== Early and personal life ==
Isaac Success Ajayi was born on 7 January 1996 in Benin City, Nigeria. He started his football career with local youth side BJ Foundation Academy, and appeared regularly for the team as a young player.

== Club career ==
In November 2013, Success signed a pre-contract agreement with Italian side Udinese, which would be effective from January 2014, for a €400,000 fee. However, he was only granted a work permit in March of the following year, and immediately joined Spanish club Granada, being assigned to the reserves in Segunda División B.

On 31 August 2014, Success made his first-team debut, starting in a 1–1 away draw against Elche at the age of 18 years and seven months, being their youngest player ever to appear in a La Liga match. He scored his first professional goal on 7 December, netting his side's only goal in a home draw against Valencia, for the same scoreline. On 7 August 2015, Success extended his contract with the club, signing a four-year deal until 2019 and being subsequently promoted to the main squad.

On 1 July 2016, Success agreed a five-year deal with English Premier League side Watford in a record transfer fee, estimated around £12.5 million from Granada. He scored just once in 19 appearances in the 2016–17 season and, after just one appearance for the team in the 2017–18 season, was loaned back to Spain, joining Málaga on 31 January 2018 until the remainder of the season.

On 26 August 2021, Success left Watford after a five-year spell, signing for Italian club Udinese on a three-year deal, the club he was previously linked to years before.

On 27 August 2024, Udinese terminated Success's contract by mutual consent, making him a free agent.

In October 2024, two months after leaving Udinese as a free agent, it was announced that Success had signed for highly decorated Emirati club Al-Wasl on a free transfer.

== International career ==
In 2013 Success was called up to Nigeria under-17's for the year's FIFA U-17 World Cup, being also named vice-captain. He appeared in the first two games, but was sidelined during the rest of the tournament due to an injury. Success got his first call up to the senior Nigeria side for a 2018 FIFA World Cup qualifier against Zambia in October 2016. On 23 March 2017, Success made his debut for Nigeria, coming on as a substitute in a 1–1 draw against Senegal at The Hive Stadium in London.

== Career statistics ==
=== Club ===
As of match played 19 May 2024

Appearances and goals by club, season and competition
Club	Season	League			National cup		League cup		Other		Total	
Club	Season	Division	Apps	Goals	Apps	Goals	Apps	Goals	Apps	Goals	Apps	Goals
Granada B	2013–14	Segunda División B	5	3	—		—		—		5	3
Granada B	2014–15	Segunda División B	15	6	—		—		—		15	6
Granada B	Total		20	9	—		—		—		20	9
Granada	2014–15	La Liga	19	1	4	0	—		—		23	1
Granada	2015–16	La Liga	30	6	3	0	—		—		33	6
Granada	Total		49	7	7	0	—		—		56	7
Watford	2016–17	Premier League	19	1	0	0	0	0	—		19	1
Watford	2017–18	Premier League	0	0	0	0	1	0	—		1	0
Watford	2018–19	Premier League	30	1	3	1	2	2	—		35	4
Watford	2019–20	Premier League	5	0	1	0	1	0	—		7	0
Watford	2020–21	Championship	10	1	0	0	0	0	—		10	1
Watford	Total		64	3	4	1	4	2	—		72	6
Málaga (loan)	2017–18	La Liga	9	0	0	0	—		—		9	0
Udinese	2021–22	Serie A	22	2	2	1	—		—		24	3
Udinese	2022–23	Serie A	30	1	2	1	—		—		32	2
Udinese	2023–24	Serie A	27	1	0	0	—		—		27	1
Udinese	Total		79	4	4	2	—		—		83	6
Career total			220	23	15	3	4	2	0	0	239	28

== Honours ==
Watford

- FA Cup runner-up: 2018–19
