= Moyola =

Moyola may refer to:

- River Moyola, Northern Ireland
- Moyola Park, estate on the river
- Baron Moyola, title of James Chichester-Clark
- Maigh Seóla, a plain in County Galway, Ireland
