= Mariola =

Mariola may refer to:

- Mariola (district), a district in Lleida, Catalonia, Spain
- Mariola (manufacturer), a bass amplifier and loudspeaker manufacturer
- Mariola (plant), a common name for Parthenium incanum, a plant species in the family Asteraceae
- Mariola (wasp), a wasp genus in the subfamily Encyrtinae
