= David Lombán =

Spanish footballer

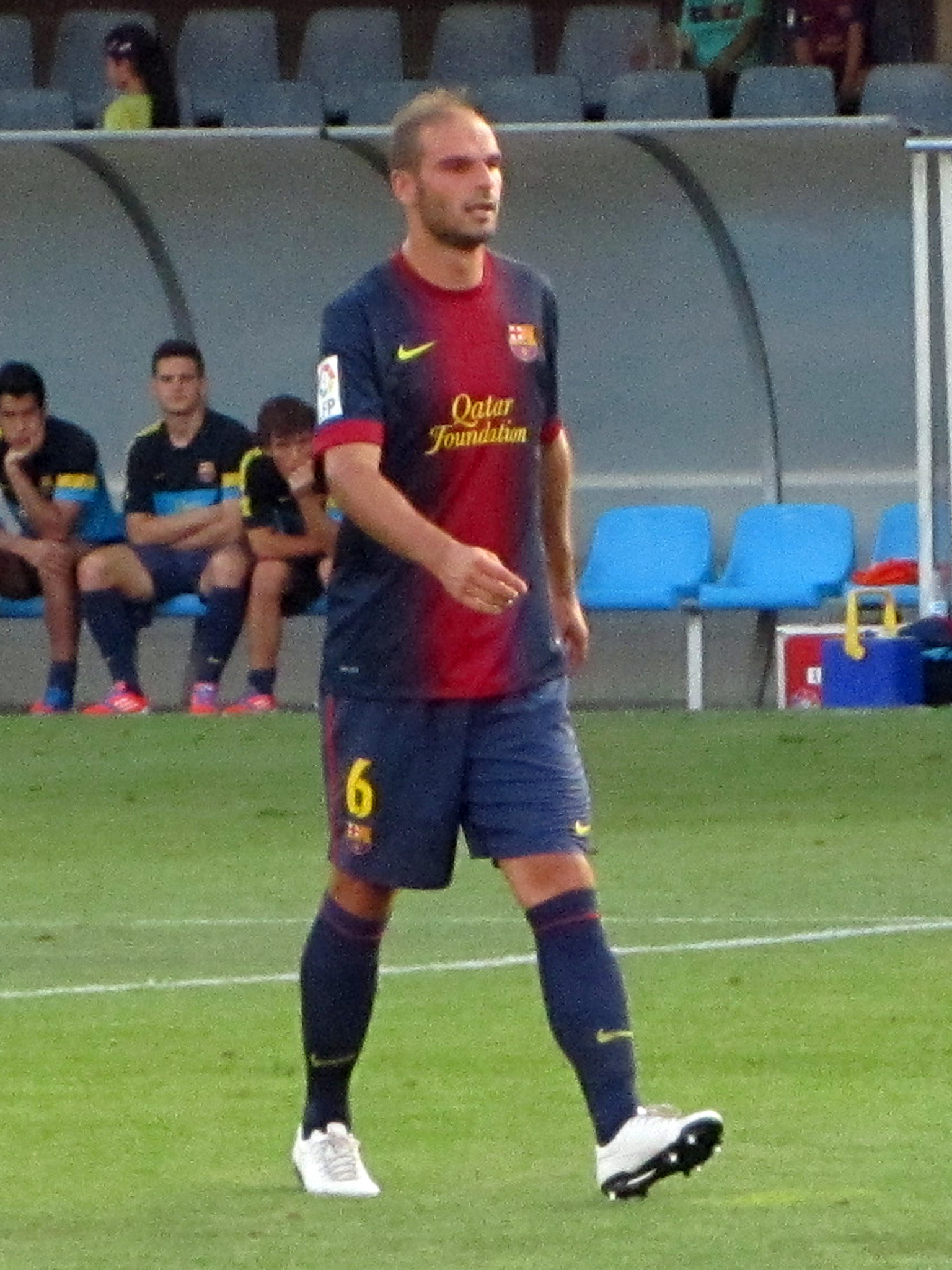
- Lombán with Barcelona B in 2012

Personal information
- Full name: David Rodríguez Lombán
- Date of birth: 5 June 1987 (age 39)
- Place of birth: Avilés, Spain
- Height: 1.85 m (6 ft 1 in)
- Position: Centre-back

Youth career
- Hispano
- Oviedo
- Valencia

Senior career*
Years	Team	Apps	(Gls)
2006–2009	Valencia B	37	(1)
2007–2010	Valencia	3	(0)
2009–2010	→ Salamanca (loan)	21	(0)
2010–2012	Xerez	75	(4)
2012–2013	Barcelona B	33	(3)
2013–2015	Elche	62	(6)
2015–2017	Granada	52	(2)
2017–2018	Eibar	13	(1)
2018–2022	Málaga	86	(5)
Total		382	(22)

International career
2004–2005	Spain U17	11	(1)
2007	Spain U20	1	(0)
Medal record
Men's football
Representing Spain
UEFA European Under-17 Championship
Runner-up	2004 France
- * Club domestic league appearances and goals

David Rodríguez Lombán (born 5 June 1987) is a Spanish former professional footballer who played as a central defender.

== Club career ==
Born in Avilés, Asturias, Lombán finished his development at Valencia CF, and made his senior debut with the reserves in the 2006–07 season, in the Segunda División B. On 15 December 2007 he appeared in his first official game with the main squad, coming on as a second-half substitute in a 0–3 La Liga home loss against FC Barcelona. In October of the following year, he suffered a knee injury which kept him sidelined for six months.

On 2 July 2009, Lombán joined Segunda División club UD Salamanca in a season-long loan deal. In summer 2010, the free agent moved to Xerez CD of the same league.

Lombán signed for FC Barcelona B still in the second tier on 11 July 2012. On 8 July of the following year he terminated his contract with the Catalans and moved to Elche CF, recently promoted to the top flight.

On 10 August 2015, after his team suffered administrative relegation, Lombán joined Granada CF also of the top division after agreeing to a three-year deal. After again dropping down a level in 2017, he signed a one-year contract with SD Eibar on 2 September that year.

== Honours ==
Valencia

- Copa del Rey: 2007–08
