= Rene Krhin =

Slovenian footballer (born 1990)

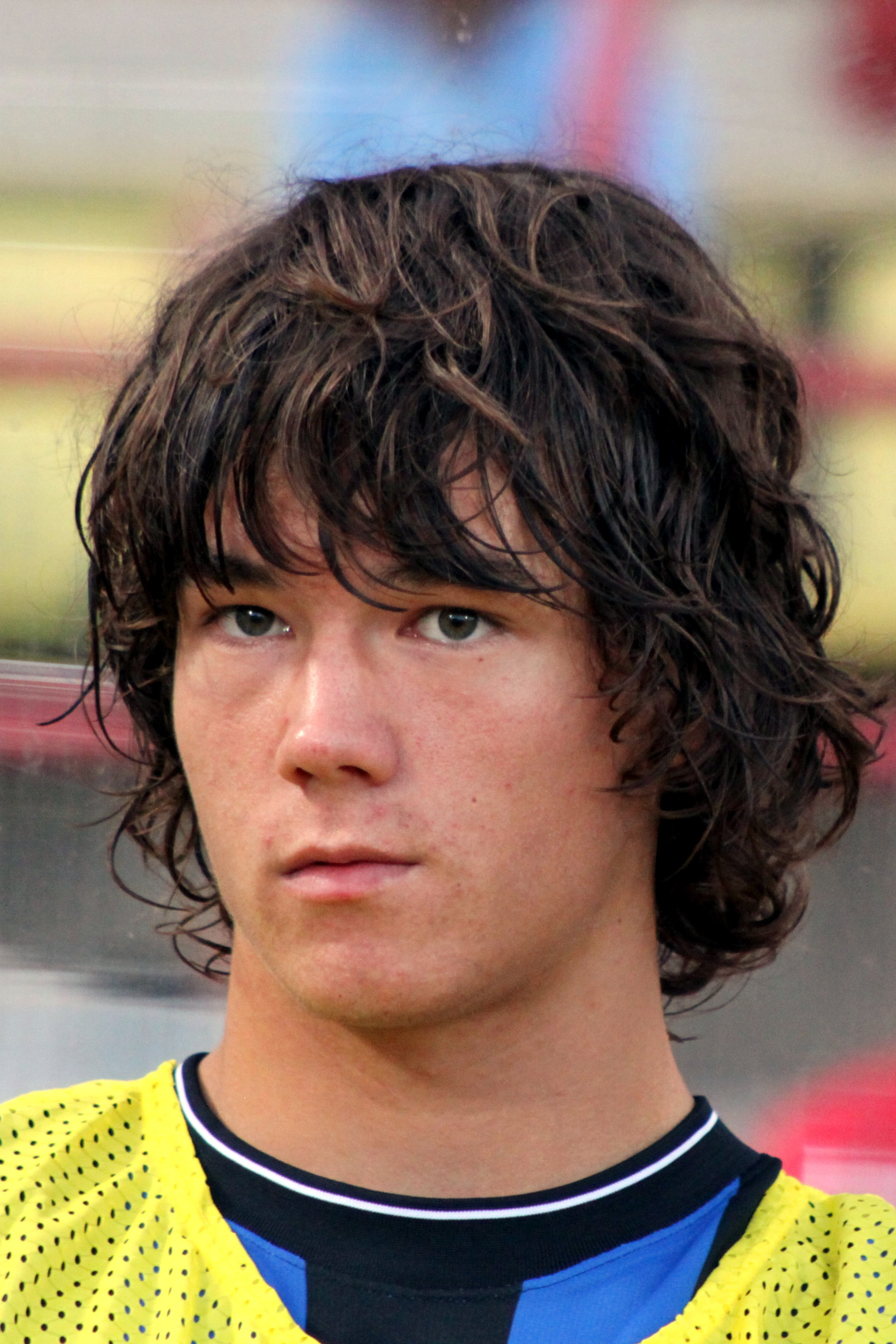
- Krhin with Inter Milan in 2009

Personal information
- Full name: Rene Krhin
- Date of birth: 21 May 1990 (age 36)
- Place of birth: Maribor, SR Slovenia, Yugoslavia
- Height: 1.89 m (6 ft 2 in)
- Position: Central midfielder

Youth career
- 1999–2007: Maribor
- 2007–2009: Inter Milan
- 2010–2012: Bologna

Senior career*
| Years | Team | Apps | (Gls) |
| 2009–2010 | Inter Milan | 5 | (0) |
| 2010–2014 | Bologna | 59 | (1) |
| 2014–2015 | Inter Milan | 3 | (0) |
| 2015 | → Córdoba (loan) | 14 | (0) |
| 2015–2018 | Granada | 36 | (0) |
| 2017–2018 | → Nantes (loan) | 18 | (1) |
| 2018–2020 | Nantes | 24 | (0) |
| 2021 | Castellón | 7 | (0) |
| 2021–2022 | Western United | 16 | (1) |
| Total | | 182 | (3) |

International career
| 2006 | Slovenia U17 | 1 | (0) |
| 2007 | Slovenia U18 | 3 | (0) |
| 2007–2009 | Slovenia U19 | 9 | (1) |
| 2011 | Slovenia U21 | 7 | (0) |
| 2009–2019 | Slovenia | 48 | (2) |
- * Club domestic league appearances and goals

Rene Krhin (born 21 May 1990) is a Slovenian former professional footballer who played as a central midfielder. He earned a total of 48 caps for the Slovenia national team.

== Club career ==
=== Inter Milan ===
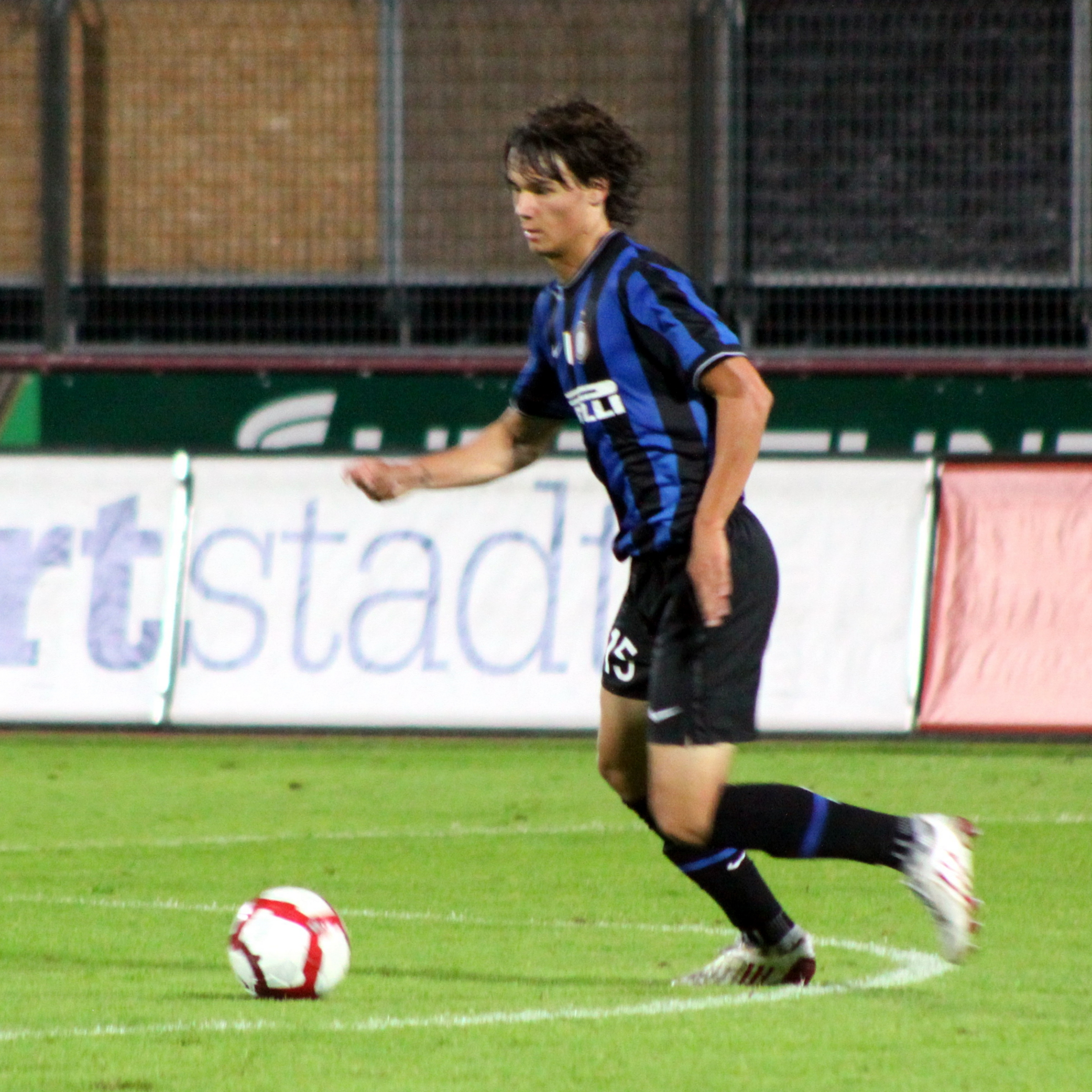
Krhin playing for Inter Milan

Born in Maribor, SFR Yugoslavia (present-day Slovenia), Krhin progressed through youth ranks at Maribor before signing for Inter Milan alongside fellow Maribor player Vid Belec in January 2007. At the age of 16 as a European Union player, he started to play for Inter Milan at Allievi Nazionali (U17) team.

After spending two seasons at Allievi Nazionali (U17) team, Krhin was called up by manager José Mourinho to the Inter first team for the pre-season tour of the United States in July 2009, and subsequently played in several friendlies. For the 2009–10 competitive season, he was called up to the match squads, but did not make the starting eleven or the bench for the first three games, against Lazio in the Supercoppa Italiana, Bari, and AC Milan.

He subsequently made his official debut for Inter against Parma in the third round of the Serie A, coming on as a substitute for Wesley Sneijder. After the match, Krhin described his Inter Milan debut as a “dream come true”. On 1 November 2009, he made his first league start in a 2–0 win over Livorno.

In November 2009, he signed a reported five-year contract, keeping him until 2014. Although he spent most of the season on the substitute bench for the rest of the 2009–10 season, Krhin finished the season, making five appearances.

=== Bologna ===
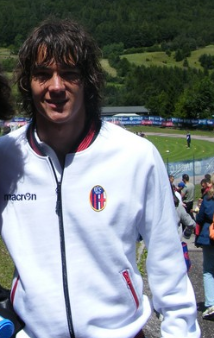
Krhin during his time at Bologna in 2011

On 27 July 2010, he moved to fellow Serie A side Bologna in a co-ownership deal for €2 million.

However, at the start of the 2010–11 season, Krhin suffered a setback when he was plagued by injuries. It wasn't until on 14 November 2010 when Krhin made his debut, coming on as a second-half substitute, in a 1–0 win over Brescia. This was followed up by playing the whole game on 21 November 2010, in a 4–1 loss against Napoli. In his first season at the club, Krhin made five appearances in his first season.

Krhin made his first appearance for the side in the 2011–12 season, starting the whole game, in a 2–0 loss against Fiorentina in the opening game of the season. However, Krhin's first team opportunities at Bologna continued to be limited. On 11 March 2012, he scored his first goal in Serie A during the match against Lazio, which was won by Bologna 3–1. Krhin ended his season at Bologna after suffering a knee injury, in a 3–1 loss against Palermo on 1 April 2012. At the end of the 2011–12 season, Krhin went on to make nine appearances and scoring once in all competitions.

In the 2012–13 season, Krhin continued to rehabilitate from his knee injury at the start of the season. It wasn't until on 28 October 2012 when he made his return from injury, coming on as a second–half substitute, in a 3–1 loss against his former club, Inter Milan. Since his return, Krhin began to have a handful of first team football at Bologna. At the end of the 2012–13 season, Krhin went on to make 22 appearances in all competitions.

In the 2013–14 season, Krhin featured for the first two matches to the start of the season before suffering an injury. Although he returned to the first team from injury, he continued to play out in different midfield positions. But he once played in central–defence, in a 0–0 draw against Chievo on 4 November 2013. Although he suffered setback of suspension and injury, the club were relegated from Serie A. Despite this, Krhin went on to make 28 appearances in all competitions.

=== Back to Inter Milan ===
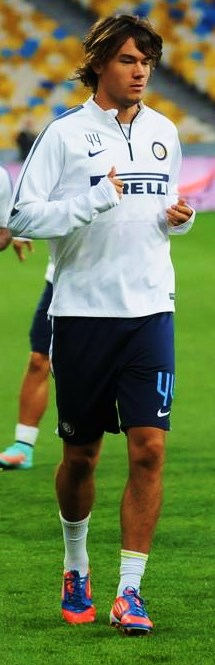
Krhin pictured his time in his second spell at Inter Milan in September 2014

Krhin was re-signed by Inter Milan from Bologna in June 2014 for €1.2 million on a contract until 30 June 2016.

Having started the season on the substitute bench, Krhin finally re-debuted for the club, coming on as a late substitute, in a 1–0 win over Sampdoria on 29 October 2014. He then started the whole game, in a 0–0 draw against Qarabağ in the sixth matchday of the UEFA Europa League group stage.

==== Loan to Córdoba ====
On 30 January 2015, after making only three league appearances for the Nerazzurri during the first part of the season, Krhin joined La Liga side Córdoba on loan until the end of the season. Krhin made his Córdoba debut, starting the whole game in the central midfield position, in a 3–0 loss against Sevilla on 14 February 2015. Although his time were marred by suspension for breaching the club's curfew and injury, Krhin quickly became a first team player there, being featured in the midfield position and went on to make 14 appearances for the side.

=== Granada ===
On 23 July 2015, Krhin moved to fellow La Liga team Granada, after agreeing to a four-year deal.

Krhin made his Granada debut, starting the whole game in the defensive midfield, in a 2–1 win over Getafe on 30 August 2015. Since making his debut for Granada, Krhin quickly became a first team player there, being featured in the midfield position. After suffering an injury as the 2015–16 season progressed, Krhin returned to the first team, although his playing time was reduced to substitute bench. At the end of the 2015–16 season, Krhin finished his first season, making 25 appearances in all competitions.

The 2016–17 season, however, restricted Krhin to twelve appearances, due to injuries, which has marred most of the season. Despite this, Krhin returned to the first team on 16 April 2017, captaining the side and played 74 minutes, in a 3–0 loss against Celta. At the end of the 2016–17 season, Krhin were among players to be departing from Granada following their relegation in La Liga. It came after when he's no longer in the club's first team plan ahead of the 2017–18 season.

==== Loan to Nantes ====
On 26 August 2017, Krhin agreed a loan transfer to French Ligue 1 club Nantes. He made his team debut on 24 September 2017 in an away tie against Strasbourg, which Nantes won 2–1. On 12 June 2018, Nantes exercised the purchase option on Krhin.

=== Castellón ===
On 10 February 2021, he signed with Spanish side Castellón as a free agent, on a deal until the end of the season.

== International career ==
=== Youth career ===
Krhin has represented Slovenia at under-17, under-18, under-19, and under-21 levels. He captained the under-19 team during the U19 European Championship qualifiers, but did not appear at the final tournament due to club commitments.

Krhin was called up for the under-21 team for the first time in February 2011. He made his Slovenia U21 debut in a 1–1 draw against Croatia U21 on 9 February 2011. He went on to make seven appearances for Slovenia U21.

=== Senior career ===
Krhin made his senior debut in a friendly on 5 September 2009, a 2–1 loss to England, coming on as a second-half substitute. He is one of the youngest debutants for the Slovenian national team, having been capped for the first time at the age of 19 years, 3 months and 15 days.

Ahead of the 2010 FIFA World Cup in South Africa, Krhin was among contenders to be included in the 23 men squad for Slovenia. Initially included in the 30 men squad, Krhin made the cut after manager Matjaž Kek named the final squad. However, Krhin never made appearance throughout the campaign, as he appeared three times as an unused substitute.

After a year away from the senior national team, Krhin was called up again on 30 September 2011 and made his first appearance on 11 October 2011, in a 1–0 win over Serbia. Krhin scored his first international goal on 7 June 2013 in a World Cup qualifying match against Iceland. Three years later, on 4 September 2016, Khrin scored again, in a 2–2 draw against Lithuania.

== Career statistics ==
=== International ===
Appearances and goals by national team and year
| National team | Year | Apps | Goals |
|---|---|---|---|
| Slovenia | 2009 | 2 | 0 |
| Slovenia | 2010 | 2 | 0 |
| Slovenia | 2011 | 2 | 0 |
| Slovenia | 2012 | 2 | 0 |
| Slovenia | 2013 | 7 | 1 |
| Slovenia | 2014 | 1 | 0 |
| Slovenia | 2015 | 6 | 0 |
| Slovenia | 2016 | 8 | 1 |
| Slovenia | 2017 | 4 | 0 |
| Slovenia | 2018 | 6 | 0 |
| Slovenia | 2019 | 8 | 0 |
| Total | | 48 | 2 |

Scores and results list Slovenia's goal tally first, score column indicates score after each Krhin goal.

List of international goals scored by Rene Krhin
| No. | Date | Venue | Opponent | Score | Result | Competition |
|---|---|---|---|---|---|---|
| 1 | 7 June 2013 | Laugardalsvöllur, Reykjavík, Iceland | Iceland | 4–2 | 4–2 | 2014 FIFA World Cup qualification |
| 2 | 4 September 2016 | LFF Stadium, Vilnius, Lithuania | Lithuania | 1–2 | 2–2 | 2018 FIFA World Cup qualification |

== Honours ==
Inter Milan

- Serie A: 2009–10
- Coppa Italia: 2009–10
- UEFA Champions League: 2009–10

Western United

- A-League Men Champions: 2021–22
