= Javi Márquez =

Spanish footballer

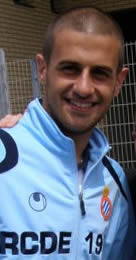
- Márquez in 2009

Personal information
- Full name: Javier Márquez Moreno
- Date of birth: 11 May 1986 (age 40)
- Place of birth: Barcelona, Spain
- Height: 1.74 m (5 ft 9 in)
- Position: Central midfielder

Youth career
- Gramenet
- 1999–2005: Espanyol

Senior career*
Years	Team	Apps	(Gls)
2005–2009	Espanyol B	86	(14)
2007–2012	Espanyol	53	(3)
2012–2014	Mallorca	25	(3)
2013–2014	→ Elche (loan)	29	(2)
2014–2017	Granada	51	(0)
2017	New York Cosmos	27	(6)
2018–2020	Gimnàstic	46	(2)
Total		317	(30)

International career
2010–2015	Catalonia	2	(0)
- * Club domestic league appearances and goals

Javier "Javi" Márquez Moreno (Spanish pronunciation: [xaˈβjeɾ ˈmaɾkeθ]; born 11 May 1986) is a Spanish former professional footballer who played as a central midfielder.

== Club career ==
Márquez in action for Espanyol in 2009

=== Espanyol ===
Born in Barcelona, Catalonia, Márquez was a product of hometown RCD Espanyol's youth system. He was promoted to the first team for the 2009–10 season, making his La Liga debut on 19 September by playing 30 minutes at Deportivo de La Coruña in a 3–2 win, after coming on as a substitute for Ben Sahar.

Márquez quickly established himself in the first team and, on 20 December 2009, scored his first goal in a 2–0 home win against UD Almería. However, his campaign ended prematurely in March 2010 after he broke his leg in a match with Sevilla FC.

Márquez recovered fully for 2010–11, being an undisputed starter for the Mauricio Pochettino-led side while partnering another Espanyol youth graduate, Raúl Baena, in central midfield. However, after recovering from another injury, he was deemed surplus to requirements by the manager, and chose not to renew his contract.

=== Mallorca ===
On 30 June 2012, Márquez joined RCD Mallorca as Sergio Tejera moved in the opposite direction. He made his official debut precisely against his former side, starting and playing 54 minutes in the 2–1 home win.

Márquez' spell at the Iberostar Stadium was curtailed by an injury to his left ankle, and his team also suffered relegation.

=== Granada ===
In the summer of 2014, Márquez signed a four-year contract for Granada CF after a season-long spell at fellow top-tier club Elche CF. He appeared in 25 games – 15 starts – in his first year, as the Andalusians narrowly retained their status.

Márquez was released in late January 2017, aged 30.

=== New York Cosmos ===
On 24 February 2017, the New York Cosmos announced that they had signed Márquez for the 2017 campaign. He scored his first goal for his new team on 22 April, in a 1–1 home draw against the Jacksonville Armada FC.

=== Gimnàstic ===
On 8 January 2018, free agent Márquez agreed to a two-and-a-half-year deal at Gimnàstic de Tarragona in the Segunda División. In November 2020, the 34-year-old announced his retirement.

== Personal life ==
In March 2016, Márquez became the father of a baby boy. As a deference to his wife, he named him Modric after the Croatian footballer.
