= SK Viktorie Jirny =

- Full name: SK Viktorie Jirny
- Founded: 1928
- Dissolved: 2019
Home colours

SK Viktorie Jirny was a Czech football club located in the town of Jirny in the Central Bohemian Region. The club, which was founded in 1927, took part in the Czech Cup, reaching the second round in 2006–07. In the 2000s and 2010s, the club won numerous regional, lower-league competitions, but generally declined the chance of being promoted. The club ceased operations in the middle of the 2018–19 season.

== Fourth tier ==
Jirny won Divize B of the Czech Fourth Division in 2007–08, although they refused promotion. The club had another chance to be promoted in 2009, but again refused the opportunity. In 2009–10 the club again refused to be promoted after winning their division.

The club won Divize B in the 2010–11 season but decided not to be promoted and SK Roudnice nad Labem were promoted instead. In 2011, Jirny became a farm team for Czech 2. Liga side FK Bohemians Prague (Střížkov). In 2011–12 the club refused to be promoted for a fifth time, having won their division once again. SK Zápy were promoted instead. After winning the Fourth Division for the fifth time in six seasons, the club finally accepted promotion to the Bohemian Football League ahead of the 2013–14 season.

== Third tier ==
Jirny won the Bohemian Football League twice in a row in the 2015–2016 and 2016–2017 seasons, but refused promotion to the Czech National Football League both times.

The club folded in March 2019, during the winter break of the 2018–19 Bohemian Football League season. Their results from the first half of the season were annulled.

== Historical names ==
- 1927 – SK Viktorie Jirny (Sportovní klub Viktorie Jirny)
- 1949 – DSO Sokol Jirny (Dobrovolná sportovní organizace Sokol Jirny)
- 1958 – TJ Sokol Jirny (Tělovýchovná jednota Sokol Jirny)
- 1993 – SK Viktorie Jirny (Sportovní klub Viktorie Jirny)

== Honours ==
- Czech Fourth Division
  - Champions 2007–08, 2009–10, 2010–11, 2011–12, 2012–13
  - Runners-up 2006–07, 2008–09
- Bohemian Football League (Tier 3)
  - Champions 2015–16, 2016–17
  - Runners-up 2014–15
