= 2014–15 UD Almería season =

UD Almería
2014–15 season
- President: Alfonso García
- Head coach: Francisco (until 9 December); Juan Ignacio Martínez (from 13 December); Sergi Barjuán (from 6 April)
- Stadium: Juegos Mediterráneos
- La Liga: 19th (relegated)
- Copa del Rey: Round of 16
- Top goalscorer: League: Tomer Hemed (8); All: Tomer Hemed (8)
Home colours	Away colours	Third colours

The 2014–15 season was UD Almería's 25th season of existence and the second consecutive in the top flight of Spanish football, after narrowly avoiding relegation in the last season.

== Squad ==
As of 23 May 2015

No.	Name	Pos.	Nat.	Place of birth	Date of birth (age)	Club caps	Club goals	Int. caps	Int. goals	Signed from	Date signed	Fee	Contract End
Goalkeepers
1	Julián Cuesta	GK	(Spain) (Andalusia)	Campotéjar	28 March 1991 (aged 24)	19	0	–	–	Sevilla	6 June 2014	Undisc.	30 June 2017
25	Rubén	GK	(Spain) (Galicia (Spain))	Coristanco	22 June 1984 (aged 30)	23	0	–	–	Rayo	28 May 2014	Free	30 June 2015
30	Yeray	GK	(Spain) (Catalonia)	Selva	10 June 1992 (aged 22)	–	–	–	–	Almería B	19 December 2014	Free	30 June 2017
Defenders
2	Michel Macedo	RB	(Brazil)	Rio de Janeiro (Rio de Janeiro (state))	15 February 1990 (aged 25)	113	4	–	–	Flamengo (Brazil)	23 June 2008	Undisc.	30 June 2016
3	Fran Vélez	CB/LB/DM	(Spain) (Catalonia)	Tarragona	13 June 1991 (aged 23)	22	1	–	–	Almería B	13 January 2014	Free	30 June 2016
4	Ximo Navarro	RB/CB	(Spain) (Andalusia)	Guadahortuna	23 January 1990 (aged 25)	29	0	–	–	Mallorca	12 June 2014	Free	30 June 2017
5	Ángel Trujillo	CB	(Spain) (Community of Madrid)	Madrid	8 September 1987 (aged 27)	113	1	–	–	Almería B	8 June 2012	Free	30 June 2017
6	Mauro dos Santos	CB/RB	(Argentina)	Santo Tomé	7 July 1989 (aged 25)	34	1	–	–	Murcia	22 July 2014	Free	30 June 2015
14	José Manuel Casado	LB	(Spain) (Andalusia)	Coria del Río	9 August 1986 (aged 28)	8	0	–	–	Málaga	30 January 2015	Free	30 June 2016
16	Sebastián Dubarbier	LB/LW	(Argentina)	La Plata	19 February 1986 (aged 29)	61	1	–	–	Córdoba	28 June 2013	Free	30 June 2016
21	Mané	LB	(Spain) (Andalusia)	Tarifa	21 December 1981 (aged 33)	125	4	–	–	M. Tel Aviv (Israel)	23 December 2013	Free	30 June 2015
28	Antonio Marín	RB/CB	(Spain) (Andalusia)	Benalúa	17 June 1996 (aged 18)	6	0	–	–	Almería B	17 December 2013	Free	30 June 2015
36	Charlie Took	CB	(Cameroon)	Douala	25 May 1993 (aged 21)	–	–	–	–	Almería B	17 April 2015	Free	30 June 2015
Midfielders
7	Verza	DM/CM	(Spain) (Valencian Community)	Orihuela	26 September 1986 (aged 28)	158	16	–	–	Albacete	29 June 2011	Free	30 June 2015
8	Wellington Silva	RW/LW/SS	(Brazil)	Rio de Janeiro (Rio de Janeiro (state))	6 January 1993 (aged 22)	35	0	–	–	Arsenal (England)	14 July 2014	Loan	30 June 2015
15	Corona (c)	CM/DM/AM	(Spain) (Castilla–La Mancha)	Talavera	12 February 1981 (aged 34)	309	22	–	–	Zaragoza	11 August 2006	Free	30 June 2015
17	Édgar Méndez	RW/LW	(Spain) (Canary Islands)	Arafo	30 April 1991 (aged 24)	31	5	–	–	Almería B	22 June 2014	Free	30 June 2018
22	Thomas Partey	CM/DM	(Ghana)	Odumase Krobo	13 June 1993 (aged 21)	32	4	–	–	Atlético Madrid	27 July 2014	Loan	30 June 2015
23	Fernando Soriano	CM/AM	(Spain) (Aragon)	Zaragoza	24 September 1979 (aged 35)	302	44	–	–	Osasuna	25 July 2011	Free	30 June 2015
24	Javier Espinosa	AM/LW	(Spain) (Castilla–La Mancha)	Talavera La Reina	19 September 1992 (aged 22)	16	1	–	–	Villarreal	9 January 2015	Loan	30 June 2015
26	Iván	LW/RW	(Spain) (Andalusia)	Jaén	23 September 1992 (aged 22)	2	0	–	–	Almería B	4 December 2014	Free	30 June 2017
29	José Ángel	CM	(Spain) (Andalusia)	Seville	21 June 1992 (aged 22)	2	0	–	–	Almería B	4 December 2014	Free	30 June 2019
31	Ramon Azeez	CM/DM	(Nigeria)	Abuja	12 December 1992 (aged 22)	53	2	4	0	Almería B	28 June 2013	Free	30 June 2016
33	Gaspar	LW	(Spain) (Castilla–La Mancha)	Tarazona La Mancha	9 December 1997 (aged 17)	1	0	–	–	Almería B	11 September 2014	Free	Undisclosed
35	Carlos Selfa	CM	(Spain) (Valencian Community)	Sueca	25 April 1992 (aged 23)	1	0	–	–	Almería B	23 November 2014	Free	30 June 2015
Forwards
9	Thievy Bifouma	ST/SS	(Republic of the Congo)	Saint-Denis (France)	13 May 1992 (aged 23)	30	4	11	5	Espanyol	13 August 2014	Loan	30 June 2015
10	Tomer Hemed	ST	(Israel)	Kiryat Tiv'on	2 May 1987 (aged 28)	35	8	15	10	Mallorca	2 July 2014	Free	30 June 2016
19	Jonathan Zongo	ST/RW	(Burkina Faso)	Ouagadougou	6 April 1989 (aged 26)	94	8	15	2	Almería B	1 August 2011	Free	30 June 2017
32	Dani Romera	ST	(Spain) (Andalusia)	Almería	23 August 1995 (aged 19)	9	0	–	–	Almería B	29 November 2013	Free	30 June 2018

== Coaches ==
Name	Nat.	Place of birth	Date of birth (age)	Signed from	Date signed	Role	Departure	Manner	Contract End
Francisco	(Spain) (Andalusia)	Almería	17 June 1978 (age 48)	Almería B	29 June 2013	Permanent	9 December 2014	Sacked	30 June 2015
Miguel Rivera	(Spain) (Andalusia)	Alhaurín de la Torre	8 May 1961 (age 65)	Almería B	9 December 2014	Interim	13 December 2014	Ended tenure	30 June 2015
Juan Ignacio Martínez	(Spain) (Valencian Community)	Rabasa	23 June 1964 (age 62)	Free agent	11 December 2014	Permanent	5 April 2015	Sacked	30 June 2015
Miguel Rivera	(Spain) (Andalusia)	Alhaurín de la Torre	8 May 1961 (age 65)	Almería B	5 April 2015	Interim	6 April 2015	Ended tenure	30 June 2015
Sergi Barjuán	(Spain) (Catalonia)	Les Franqueses	28 December 1971 (age 54)	Free agent	6 April 2015	Permanent			30 June 2015

=== Staff members ===
Name	Staff role
Ramón de Quintana	Assistant coach
Sergio Pardo	Fitness coach
Jesús Roche	Fitness coach
Ángel Férez	Goalkeeping coach
Pepe Morales	Scout
Antonio Ríos	Doctor
Marcelo Bronzini	Doctor

Source: UD Almería's official website

== Transfers ==
=== In ===
No.	Pos.	Nat.	Name	Age	EU	Moving from	Type	Transfer window	Ends	Transfer fee	Source
18	FW	(Thailand)	Teerasil Dangda	25	Non-EU	Muangthong United (Thailand)	Loan	Summer	2015	Free	
3	DF	(Spain)	Fran Vélez	22	EU	Almería B	Promoted	Summer	2016	Free	
11	MF	(Spain)	Quique González	24	EU	Guadalajara	Transfer	Summer	2018	Free	
25	GK	(Spain)	Rubén	29	EU	Rayo Vallecano	Transfer	Summer	2015	Free	
1	GK	(Spain)	Julián Cuesta	23	EU	Sevilla	Transfer	Summer	2017	Undisclosed	
4	DF	(Spain)	Ximo Navarro	24	EU	Mallorca	Transfer	Summer	2017	Free	
	DF	(Spain)	Raúl García	25	EU	Alavés	Loan Return	Summer	2015	Free	
17	MF	(Spain)	Édgar Méndez	23	EU	Tenerife	Loan Return	Summer	2015	Free	
10	FW	(Israel)	Tomer Hemed	27	EU	Mallorca	Transfer	Summer	2016	Free	
2	DF	(Brazil)	Michel Macedo	24	EU	Atlético Mineiro (Brazil)	Loan Return	Summer	2015	Free	
8	MF	(Brazil)	Wellington Silva	21	EU	Arsenal (England)	Loan	Summer	2015	Free	
6	DF	(Argentina)	Mauro dos Santos	25	EU	Murcia	Transfer	Summer	2015	Free	
22	MF	(Ghana)	Thomas Partey	21	EU	Atlético Madrid	Loan	Summer	2015	Free	
9	FW	(Republic of the Congo)	Thievy Bifouma	22	EU	Espanyol	Loan	Summer	2015	€200K	
		(Spain)	Juan Ignacio Martínez	50	EU	Free agent	Job Offer	During season	2015	Free	
24	MF	(Spain)	Javier Espinosa	22	EU	Villarreal	Loan	Winter	2015	Free	
14	DF	(Spain)	José Manuel Casado	28	EU	Málaga	Transfer	Winter	2016	Free	
		(Spain)	Sergi Barjuán	43	EU	Free agent	Job Offer	During season	2015	Free	

Total spending: ▼€200,000

=== Out ===
No.	Pos.	Nat.	Name	Age	EU	Moving to	Type	Transfer window	Transfer fee	Source
1	GK	(Spain)	Esteban	38	EU	Oviedo	Contract Ended	Summer	Free	
6	MF	(Spain)	Marcos Tébar	28	EU	Brentford (England)	Contract Rescinded	Summer	Free	
2	DF	(Argentina)	Marco Torsiglieri	26	EU	Metalist Kharkiv (Ukraine)	Loan Return	Summer	Free	
4	DF	(Chile)	Hans Martínez	27	Non-EU	Universidad Católica (Chile)	Loan Return	Summer	Free	
22	DF	(Portugal)	Nélson	31	EU	Palermo (Italy)	Loan Return	Summer	Free	
11	MF	(Portugal)	Hélder Barbosa	27	EU	Braga (Portugal)	Loan Return	Summer	Free	
17	MF	(Spain)	Suso	20	EU	Liverpool (England)	Loan Return	Summer	Free	
10	FW	(Spain)	Rodri	24	EU	Barcelona	Loan Return	Summer	Free	
25	GK	(Spain)	Julián Cuesta	23	EU	Sevilla	Loan Return	Summer	Free	
8	MF	(Spain)	Aleix Vidal	24	EU	Sevilla	Transfer	Summer	€3M	
	DF	(Spain)	Raúl García	25	EU	Alavés	Contract Rescinded	Summer	Free	
	DF	(Uruguay)	Marcelo Silva	25	EU	Las Palmas	Contract Rescinded	Summer	Free	
		(Spain)	Francisco	36	EU	Free agent	Contract Rescinded	During season	Free	
18	FW	(Thailand)	Teerasil Dangda	26	Non-EU	Muangthong United (Thailand)	Loan Ended	Winter	Free	
11	FW	(Spain)	Quique González	24	EU	Racing Santander	Loan	Winter	Free	
		(Spain)	Juan Ignacio Martínez	50	EU	Free agent	Contract Rescinded	During season	Free	

Total gaining: ▲€3,000,000

=== Contracts ===
No.	Pos.	Nat.	Name	Age	Status	Contract length	Expiry date	Source
23	MF	(Spain)	Fernando Soriano	34	Signed	1 year	June 2015	Marca
		(Spain)	Francisco	35	Signed	1 year	June 2015	UD Almería
15	MF	(Spain)	Corona	33	Signed	1 year	June 2015	UD Almería
2	DF	(Brazil)	Michel Macedo	24	Signed	2 years	June 2016	UD Almería
17	MF	(Spain)	Édgar Méndez	23	Signed	2 years	June 2016	UD Almería
17	MF	(Spain)	Édgar Méndez	23	Signed	2 years	June 2018	UD Almería

== Statistics ==
=== Appearances and goals ===
Updated as of 30 May 2015.

No.	Pos	Nat	Player	Total		La Liga		Copa del Rey	
No.	Pos	Nat	Player	Apps	Goals	Apps	Goals	Apps	Goals
1	GK	(Spain) ESP	Julián Cuesta	19	0	15	0	4	0
2	DF	(Brazil) BRA	Michel Macedo	18	3	13+1	2	4	1
3	DF	(Spain) ESP	Fran Vélez	17	0	14+3	0	0	0
4	DF	(Spain) ESP	Ximo Navarro	29	0	28	0	1	0
5	DF	(Spain) ESP	Ángel Trujillo	37	0	35+1	0	1	0
6	DF	(Argentina) ARG	Mauro dos Santos	34	1	28+2	1	4	0
7	MF	(Spain) ESP	Verza	36	5	33	4	3	1
8	MF	(Brazil) BRA	Wellington Silva	35	0	23+8	0	3+1	0
9	FW	(Republic of the Congo) CGO	Thievy Bifouma	30	4	21+8	4	1	0
10	FW	(Israel) ISR	Tomer Hemed	35	8	26+9	8	0	0
14	DF	(Spain) ESP	José Manuel Casado	8	0	5+3	0	0	0
15	MF	(Spain) ESP	Corona	33	0	23+8	0	2	0
16	DF	(Argentina) ARG	Sebastián Dubarbier	33	0	32	0	1	0
17	MF	(Spain) ESP	Édgar Méndez	31	5	21+9	4	1	1
19	FW	(Burkina Faso) BFA	Jonathan Zongo	28	3	16+11	2	1	1
21	DF	(Spain) ESP	Mané	9	1	3+2	0	4	1
22	MF	(Ghana) GHA	Thomas Partey	32	4	29+2	4	1	0
23	MF	(Spain) ESP	Fernando Soriano	31	3	14+15	3	1+1	0
24	MF	(Spain) ESP	Javier Espinosa	16	1	8+7	1	1	0
25	GK	(Spain) ESP	Rubén	23	0	23	0	0	0
26	MF	(Spain) ESP	Iván	2	0	0	0	1+1	0
28	DF	(Spain) ESP	Antonio Marín	5	0	1+1	0	2+1	0
29	MF	(Spain) ESP	José Ángel	2	0	0	0	0+2	0
30	GK	(Spain) ESP	Yeray	0	0	0	0	0	0
31	MF	(Nigeria) NGR	Ramon Azeez	17	0	10+4	0	3	0
32	FW	(Spain) ESP	Dani Romera	8	0	0+5	0	0+3	0
33	MF	(Spain) ESP	Gaspar	1	0	0+1	0	0	0
35	MF	(Spain) ESP	Carlos Selfa	1	0	0+1	0	0	0
Players on loan to other clubs:
11	MF	(Spain) ESP	Quique González	6	1	0+3	0	2+1	1
Players who have left the club after the start of the season:
18	FW	(Thailand) THA	Teerasil Dangda	10	1	0+6	0	3+1	1

=== Top scorers ===
Place	Position	Nation	Number	Name	La Liga	Copa del Rey	Total
1	FW	(Israel)	10	Tomer Hemed	8	0	8
2	MF	(Spain)	7	Verza	4	1	5
2	MF	(Spain)	17	Édgar Méndez	4	1	5
3	FW	(Republic of the Congo)	9	Thievy Bifouma	4	0	4
3	MF	(Ghana)	22	Thomas Partey	4	0	4
4	MF	(Spain)	23	Fernando Soriano	3	0	3
4	DF	(Brazil)	2	Michel Macedo	2	1	3
4	FW	(Burkina Faso)	19	Jonathan Zongo	2	1	3
5	DF	(Argentina)	6	Mauro dos Santos	1	0	1
5	MF	(Spain)	24	Javier Espinosa	1	0	1
5	MF	(Spain)	11	Quique González	0	1	1
5	FW	(Thailand)	18	Teerasil Dangda	0	1	1
5	DF	(Spain)	21	Mané	0	1	1
	Own goals				1	0	1
				TOTALS	34	7	41

=== Disciplinary record ===
Number	Nation	Position	Name	La Liga		Copa del Rey		Total	
Number	Nation	Position	Name	Yellow card	Red card	Yellow card	Red card	Yellow card	Red card
16	(Argentina)	DF	Sebastián Dubarbier	14	2	0	0	14	2
22	(Ghana)	MF	Thomas Partey	13	0	1	0	14	0
23	(Spain)	MF	Fernando Soriano	11	0	0	0	11	0
7	(Spain)	MF	Verza	10	0	0	0	10	0
9	(Republic of the Congo)	FW	Thievy Bifouma	7	1	1	0	8	1
6	(Argentina)	DF	Mauro dos Santos	7	2	0	0	7	2
8	(Brazil)	MF	Wellington Silva	6	0	1	0	7	0
4	(Spain)	DF	Ximo Navarro	6	0	0	0	6	0
17	(Spain)	MF	Édgar Méndez	6	0	0	0	6	0
5	(Spain)	DF	Ángel Trujillo	5	1	1	0	6	1
2	(Brazil)	DF	Michel Macedo	3	2	2	0	5	2
15	(Spain)	MF	Corona	4	0	1	0	5	0
3	(Spain)	DF	Fran Vélez	4	1	0	0	4	1
10	(Israel)	FW	Tomer Hemed	4	1	0	0	4	1
14	(Spain)	DF	José Manuel Casado	4	0	0	0	4	0
31	(Nigeria)	MF	Ramon Azeez	2	1	1	0	3	1
19	(Burkina Faso)	FW	Jonathan Zongo	3	0	0	0	3	0
24	(Spain)	MF	Javier Espinosa	3	0	0	0	3	0
1	(Spain)	GK	Julián Cuesta	2	0	0	0	2	0
25	(Spain)	GK	Rubén	2	0	0	0	2	0
18	(Thailand)	FW	Teerasil Dangda	0	0	1	0	1	0
26	(Spain)	MF	Iván	0	0	1	0	1	0
28	(Spain)	DF	Antonio Marín	0	0	1	0	1	0
			TOTALS	111	10	11	0	122	10

== Competitions ==
=== Pre-season/Friendlies ===
19 July 2014	Almería B	3 – 0	Almería	Almería
	Antonio Puertas 5'; Dani Romera 27'; Kiu 64'	Report		Stadium: Anexo of Juegos Mediterráneos; Referee: Pepe Morales

22 July 2014	Águilas	0 – 5	Almería	Águilas
		Report	5' Antonio Puertas; 6' (pen.) 10' Hemed; 51' 85' Teerasil	Stadium: El Rubial; Referee: Martínez Montalbán

25 July 2014	UCAM Murcia	1 – 2	Almería	Totana
20:30	Gongora 64'	Report	36' (pen.) Verza; 77' Teerasil	Stadium: Juan Cayuela

30 July 2014	Muangthong United	1 – 1	Almería	Nonthaburi
19:30 UTC+7	Datsakorn 20' (pen.) (yellow card)	Report	18' Jonathan	Stadium: SCG Stadium; Referee: Chaiya Mahapab

6 August 2014	Phuket	1 – 3	Almería	Phuket
19:00 UTC+7	Sanya (yellow card) 49'; Eber (yellow card) 53'; Kasipat (yellow card) 62'; Eakartit 89'	Report	(yellow card) 36' Soriano; 65' Hemed; 82' Quique; 84' Jonathan	Stadium: Surakul Stadium; Referee: Alongkorn

13 August 2014	Albacete	1 – 2	Almería	Albacete
21:00	Moutinho 75'	Report	6' (yellow card) Jonathan; 68' Édgar; (yellow card) Mané	Stadium: Carlos Belmonte; Attendance: 5,000; Referee: Arcediano Monescillo

17 August 2014	Almería	1 – 1	Córdoba	Almería
21:00	Hemed 17'; Édgar (yellow card) 30'; Ximo Navarro (yellow card) 43'	Report	(yellow card) 16' Gunino; 44' (pen.) Fidel; (yellow card) 77' Matos	Stadium: Juegos Mediterráneos; Attendance: 6,687; Referee: Pérez Montero

4 February 2015	Almería	1 – 3	Shakhtar Donetsk	Almería
	Thomas Partey 28'	Report	13' Oleksandr Volovyk; 41' Taison; 69' Alex Teixeira	Stadium: Juegos Mediterráneos; Attendance: 0 (closed doors); Referee: Alejandro Gil

=== La Liga ===
Pos	Team	Pld	W	D	L	GF	GA	GD	Pts	Qualification or relegation
16	Deportivo La Coruña	38	7	14	17	35	60	−25	35 (Note: Head-to-head record: Deportivo 7 pts, Granada 6 pts, Eibar 2 pts)	
17	Granada	38	7	14	17	29	64	−35	35	
18	Eibar	38	9	8	21	34	55	−21	35	
19	Almería (Note: Almería was docked 3 points due to an unpayment of a transfer.) (R)	38	8	8	22	35	64	−29	29	Relegation to Segunda División
20	Córdoba (R)	38	3	11	24	22	68	−46	20	Relegation to Segunda División

Source: La Liga
Rules for classification: 1) points; 2) head-to-head points; 3) head-to-head goal difference; 4) goal difference; 5) number of goals scored; 6) fair-play points; 7) playoff match
(R) Relegated

==== Results summary ====
Overall								Home						Away					
Pld	W	D	L	GF	GA	GD	Pts	W	D	L	GF	GA	GD	W	D	L	GF	GA	GD
38	8	8	22	35	64	−29	32	3	7	9	20	28	−8	5	1	13	15	36	−21

Last updated: 23 May 2015.
Source: Competitive matches

==== Results by round ====
Round	1	2	3	4	5	6	7	8	9	10	11	12	13	14	15	16	17	18	19	20	21	22	23	24	25	26	27	28	29	30	31	32	33	34	35	36	37	38
Ground	H	A	H	A	H	A	H	A	H	A	H	A	H	A	H	A	A	H	A	A	H	A	H	A	H	A	H	A	H	A	H	A	H	A	H	H	A	H
Result	D	L	D	W	L	W	D	L	L	L	L	D	L	L	L	W	W	L	L	L	W	W	D	L	D	L	D	L	L	L	W	L	W	D	D	L	L	L
Position	8	17	17	11	12	10	10	13	13	14	15	15	17	17	18	16	14	16	18	18	16	16	15	15	16	18	16	17	18	19	17	17	17	17	17	16	19	19

Updated to match(es) played on 23 May 2015. Source:
A = Away; H = Home; W = Win; D = Draw; L = Loss

==== Matches ====
23 August 2014 1	Almería	1 – 1	Espanyol	Almería
23:00	Trujillo (yellow card) 17'; Verza (yellow card) 50'; Soriano 52'; Thomas (yellow card) 80'	Report	(yellow card) 17' (red card) 32' Arbilla; (yellow card) 63' (goal) 90+12' Sergio García; (yellow card) 84' Víctor Sánchez	Stadium: Juegos Mediterráneos; Attendance: 9,782; Referee: Hernández Hernández

29 August 2014 2	Getafe	1 – 0	Almería	Getafe
20:00	Vázquez 29'; Hinestroza (yellow card) 52'; Diego Castro (yellow card) 80'; Sarabia (yellow card) 87'	Report	(yellow card) 58' Édgar; (yellow card) 71' Mauro dos Santos	Stadium: Coliseum Alfonso Pérez; Attendance: 6,000; Referee: Santiago Jaime Latre

12 September 2014 3	Almería	1 – 1	Córdoba	Almería
21:00	Édgar 11' (yellow card) 82'; Soriano (yellow card) 43'; Wellington Silva (yellow card) 47'; Thomas (yellow card) 55'	Report	19' (yellow card) 86' Fede; (yellow card) 40' Deivid; (yellow card) 69' Pantić; (yellow card) 83' Rossi	Stadium: Juegos Mediterráneos; Attendance: 10,682; Referee: Teixeira Vitiennes

21 September 2014 4	Real Sociedad	1 – 2	Almería	San Sebastián
12:00	Bergara (yellow card) 56'; Chori Castro 84'	Report	(yellow card) 23' Jonathan; 23' (o.g.) De la Bella; 51' Mauro dos Santos; (yellow card) 53' (red card) 78' Dubarbier; (yellow card) 56' Soriano; (yellow card) 56' Trujillo; (yellow card) 64' Verza; (yellow card) 72' Thomas; (yellow card) 88' Ximo	Stadium: Anoeta; Attendance: 22,526; Referee: Estrada Fernández

24 September 2014 5	Almería	0 – 1	Atlético Madrid	Almería
20:00	Dos Santos (yellow card) 65'; Jonathan (yellow card) 89'; Soriano (yellow card) 90'	Report	(yellow card) 8' Arda; (yellow card) 34' Mario Suárez; (yellow card) 36' Siqueira; 60' (yellow card) 74' Miranda; (yellow card) 78' Godín; (yellow card) 85' Raúl García	Stadium: Juegos Mediterráneos; Attendance: 11,863; Referee: Gil Manzano

28 September 2014 6	Deportivo La Coruña	0 – 1	Almería	A Coruña
17:00	Laure (yellow card) 2'; Lopo (yellow card) 89'	Report	(yellow card) 32' Trujillo; (yellow card) 40' Ximo Navarro; (yellow card) 62' Dubarbier; (yellow card) 85' Rubén; 90+2' Édgar	Stadium: Riazor; Attendance: 18,000; Referee: Teixeira Vitienes

4 October 2014 7	Almería	2 – 2	Elche	Almería
22:00	Verza 36' (pen.); Ximo Navarro (yellow card) 46'; Hemed 84'; Édgar (yellow card) 90'	Report	7' (yellow card) 67' Víctor Rodríguez; (yellow card) 21' José Ángel; (yellow card) 35' Edu Albácar; (yellow card) 42' (goal) 56' (red card) 67' Jonathas; (yellow card) 44' Mosquera	Stadium: Juegos Mediterráneos; Attendance: 9,833; Referee: Del Cerro Grande

19 October 2014 8	Villarreal	2 – 0	Almería	Vila-real
21:00	Uche 23' 60'; Jaume Costa (yellow card) 25'; Trigueros (yellow card) 39'; Gabriel Paulista (yellow card) 56'; Mario (yellow card) 73'; Cheryshev (yellow card) 74'	Report	(yellow card) 29' Azeez; (yellow card) 80' Verza	Stadium: El Madrigal; Attendance: 19,000; Referee: Clos Gómez

25 October 2014 9	Almería	0 – 1	Athletic Bilbao	Almería
16:00	Thomas (yellow card) 12'; Verza (yellow card) 71'	Report	(yellow card) 53' Iraola; 56' Etxeita	Stadium: Juegos Mediterráneos; Attendance: 9,736; Referee: Juan Martínez Munuera

2 November 2014 10	Levante	2 – 1	Almería	Valencia
19:00	David Navarro (yellow card) 7'; Barral 25'; Diop (yellow card) 60'; Víctor Casadesús 75'; Nikos (yellow card) 82'	Report	(yellow card) 34' Édgar; 69' Jonathan; (yellow card) 74' Dubarbier	Stadium: Ciutat de València; Attendance: 16,000; Referee: Prieto Iglesias

8 November 2014 11	Almería	1 – 2	Barcelona	Almería
16:00	Thomas (yellow card) 30'; Soriano (yellow card) 34'; Thievy 36'	Report	72' Neymar; 81' Alba	Stadium: Juegos Mediterráneos; Attendance: 12,606; Referee: Undiano Mallenco

24 November 2014 12	Granada	0 – 0	Almería	Granada
20:45	Iturra (yellow card) 18'; Babin (yellow card) 28'; Rochina (yellow card) 74'; Juan Carlos (yellow card) 86'	Report	(yellow card) 37' (red card) 52' Azeez	Stadium: Nuevo Los Cármenes; Attendance: 16,500; Referee: Iglesias Villanueva

1 December 2014 13	Almería	0 – 1	Rayo Vallecano	Almería
20:45	Verza (yellow card) 27'; Trujillo (yellow card) 41'; Dubarbier (yellow card) 82'; Michel (yellow card) 88'	Report	(yellow card) 11' Abdoulaye; (yellow card) 18' Tito; (yellow card) 66' Jozabed; (yellow card) 71' Léo Baptistão; 85' Kakuta	Stadium: Juegos Mediterráneos; Attendance: 9,212; Referee: Mateu Lahoz

8 December 2014 14	Eibar	5 – 2	Almería	Eibar
17:00	Piovaccari 2' (yellow card) 27'; Saúl 21'; Albentosa 30'; Dani García (yellow card) 37'; Raúl Navas 57'; Boateng (yellow card) 71'; Capa 74' (yellow card) 85'	Report	43' Soriano; (yellow card) 47' Corona; (yellow card) 53' Thomas; 77' Édgar; (yellow card) 87' Wellington Silva	Stadium: Ipurua; Attendance: 4,200; Referee: González González

12 December 2014 15	Almería	1 – 4	Real Madrid	Almería
20:45	Verza (yellow card) 11' (goal) 39' (penalty missed) 62'; Dubarbier (yellow card) 30'; Soriano (yellow card) 51'; Fran Vélez (yellow card) 63'	Report	(yellow card) 24' (goal) 41' Bale; 33' Isco; (yellow card) 57' Marcelo; (yellow card) 61' Illarramendi; (yellow card) 76' (goal) 81' 88' Cristiano Ronaldo	Stadium: Juegos Mediterráneos; Attendance: 13,950; Referee: Álvarez Izquierdo

19 December 2014 16	Celta Vigo	0 – 1	Almería	Vigo
20:45	Augusto Fernández (yellow card) 34'; Charles (yellow card) 45'; Santi Mina (yellow card) 50'; Nolito (penalty missed) 73' (yellow card) 90+4'; Fontàs (yellow card) 90+2'; Orellana (yellow card) 90+2'	Report	17' (yellow card) 43' Hemed; (yellow card) 38' Ximo Navarro; (yellow card) 87' Julián; (yellow card) 90+4' Dubarbier	Stadium: Balaídos; Attendance: 13,200; Referee: Gil Manzano

3 January 2015 17	Málaga	1 – 2	Almería	Málaga
22:00	Rosales (yellow card) 27'; Rescaldani (yellow card) 68'; Samu 72'; Miguel Torres (yellow card) 74'; Samu Castillejo (yellow card) 80'	Report	(yellow card) 25' (goal) 39' 75' (pen.) Hemed; (yellow card) 30' Verza; (yellow card) 69' Ximo Navarro; (yellow card) 85' (red card) 90+3' Michel; (yellow card) 90+1' Julián	Stadium: La Rosaleda; Attendance: 19,500; Referee: Teixeira Vitienes

11 January 2015 18	Almería	0 – 2	Sevilla	Almería
12:00	Thomas (yellow card) 19'	Report	(yellow card) 15' Aleix Vidal; (yellow card) 40' Pareja; 57' Iborra; 60' Coke	Stadium: Juegos Mediterráneos; Attendance: 12,703; Referee: Prieto Iglesias

17 January 2015 19	Valencia	3 – 2	Almería	Valencia
18:00	Parejo 11'; Rodrigo 28'; Orban (yellow card) 55'; Negredo 83'; De Paul (yellow card) 85'	Report	13' 33' Hemed; (yellow card) 40' Thomas; (yellow card) 80' Dubarbier	Stadium: Mestalla; Attendance: 37,500; Referee: Bikandi Garrido

25 January 2015 20	Espanyol	3 – 0	Almería	Barcelona
19:00	Stuani 37' 39'; Abraham (yellow card) 50'; Cañas (yellow card) 57'; Caicedo 73'	Report	(yellow card) 38' Thomas	Stadium: Cornellà-El Prat; Attendance: 16,792; Referee: Undiano Mallenco

1 February 2015 21	Almería	1 – 0	Getafe	Almería
17:00	Verza (yellow card) 39'; Édgar 43'; Hemed (yellow card) 55' (red card) 81'; Soriano (yellow card) 76'; Espinosa (yellow card) 89'	Report	(yellow card) 25' Hinestroza; (yellow card) 34' Diego Castro; (yellow card) 54' (red card) 62' Escudero; (yellow card) 89' Lago	Stadium: Juegos Mediterráneos; Attendance: 8,575; Referee: Iglesias Villanueva

8 February 2015 22	Córdoba	1 – 2	Almería	Córdoba
12:00	Cartabia 10'; Rossi (yellow card) 17'; Bebé (yellow card) 37'	Report	(yellow card) 35' Dubarbier; (yellow card) 56' Thievy; 61' 66' Michel; (yellow card) 71' Wellington Silva; (yellow card) 73' Soriano; (yellow card) 86' Trujillo	Stadium: Nuevo Arcángel; Attendance: 17,182; Referee: Juan Martínez Munuera

13 February 2015 23	Almería	2 – 2	Real Sociedad	Almería
20:45	Verza 4' (pen.); Corona (yellow card) 29'; Hemed 39'; Fran Vélez (yellow card) 46'; Thievy (yellow card) 69'; Dos Santos (yellow card) 72'; Jonathan (yellow card) 85'	Report	(yellow card) 2' Rulli; (yellow card) 18' Granero; 26' Agirretxe; 48' Canales; (yellow card) 83' Yuri; (yellow card) 84' Ansotegui	Stadium: Juegos Mediterráneos; Attendance: 8,885; Referee: Velasco Carballo

21 February 2015 24	Atlético Madrid	3 – 0	Almería	Madrid
20:00	Mandžukić 12' (pen.); Griezmann 19' 28'; Siqueira (yellow card) 57' (red card) 90'; Raúl García (yellow card) 74'	Report	(yellow card) 11' Dubarbier	Stadium: Vicente Calderón Stadium; Attendance: 44,500; Referee: Mateu Lahoz

28 February 2015 25	Almería	0 – 0	Deportivo La Coruña	Almería
20:00	Thievy (yellow card) 26' (red card) 54'; Ximo Navarro (yellow card) 53'; Édgar (yellow card) 71'; Michel (yellow card) 90+2' (red card) 90+3'	Report	(yellow card) 23' Luisinho; (yellow card) 44' José Rodríguez; (yellow card) 85' Borges	Stadium: Juegos Mediterráneos; Attendance: 8,979; Referee: Gil Manzano

7 March 2015 26	Elche	1 – 0	Almería	Elche
20:00	Víctor Rodríguez 5'; Aarón Ñíguez (yellow card) 25'; Lombán (yellow card) 36'; Adrián (yellow card) 71'	Report		Stadium: Martínez Valero; Attendance: 23,127; Referee: Del Cerro Grande

15 March 2015 27	Almería	0 – 0	Villarreal	Almería
20:00	Dos Santos (yellow card) 32' (red card) 39'; Corona (yellow card) 34'; Fran Vélez (yellow card) 63'; Verza (yellow card) 78'	Report	(yellow card) 14' Rukavina; (yellow card) 23' Dorado; (yellow card) 36' (red card) 55' Jaume Costa; (yellow card) 54' Gerard Moreno; (yellow card) 85' Pina	Stadium: Juegos Mediterráneos; Attendance: 9,646; Referee: Undiano Mallenco

21 March 2015 28	Athletic Bilbao	2 – 1	Almería	Bilbao
22:00	Etxeita 9'; Ibai (yellow card) 18'; Mikel Rico 26'; Laporte (yellow card) 84'	Report	(yellow card) 12' Dubarbier; 47' (o.g.) Balenziaga; (yellow card) 48' (red card) 88' Fran Vélez; (yellow card) 79' Soriano; (yellow card) 87' Hemed; (yellow card) 89' Thomas	Stadium: San Mamés; Attendance: 36,500; Referee: Prieto Iglesias

4 April 2015 29	Almería	1 – 4	Levante	Almería
20:00	Mauro dos Santos (yellow card) 18'; Verza (yellow card) 27'; Dubarbier (yellow card) 45' (red card) 58'; Hemed 70'; Wellington Silva (yellow card) 89'; Édgar Méndez (yellow card) 90+5'	Report	(yellow card) 17' Toño; 17' 53' 75' Barral; 31' Víctor; (yellow card) 64' Juanfran	Stadium: Juegos Mediterráneos; Attendance: 9,603; Referee: González González

8 April 2015 30	Barcelona	4 – 0	Almería	Barcelona
20:00	Messi 33'; Mascherano (yellow card) 43'; Suárez 65' 90+2'; Bartra 75'	Report	(yellow card) 55' Thievy; (yellow card) 87' Casado; (yellow card) 89' Soriano	Stadium: Camp Nou; Attendance: 73,837; Referee: Hernández Hernández

11 April 2015 31	Almería	3 – 0	Granada	Almería
22:00	Soriano (yellow card) 19'; Thievy (yellow card) 41'; Thomas 44' (yellow card) 46' (goal) 86'; Espinosa 59'; Mauro dos Santos (yellow card) 62'	Report	(yellow card) 30' Cala; (yellow card) 49' Nyom; (yellow card) 61' Fran Rico; (yellow card) 83' Insúa	Stadium: Juegos Mediterráneos; Attendance: 8,920; Referee: Jaime Latre

19 April 2015 32	Rayo Vallecano	2 – 0	Almería	Madrid
12:00	Amaya 23'; Tito (yellow card) 77'; Miku 90'	Report	(yellow card) 52' Dubarbier; (yellow card) 79' Espinosa	Stadium: Vallecas; Attendance: 10,165; Referee: Gil Manzano

26 April 2015 33	Almería	2 – 0	Eibar	Almería
17:00	Thievy 7' (yellow card) 84'; Casado (yellow card) 53'; Verza 67' (pen.); Espinosa (yellow card) 87'; Wellington Silva (yellow card) 88'	Report	(yellow card) 56' Abraham; (yellow card) 79' Boateng; (yellow card) 85' Lekić	Stadium: Juegos Mediterráneos; Attendance: 10,715; Referee: Del Cerro Grande

29 April 2015 34	Real Madrid	3 – 0	Almería	Madrid
20:00	James 44'; Mauro dos Santos 49' (o.g.); Coentrão (yellow card) 75'; Arbeloa 84'	Report		Stadium: Santiago Bernabéu; Attendance: 63,813; Referee: Iglesias Villanueva

4 May 2015 35	Almería	2 – 2	Celta Vigo	Almería
20:45	Thievy 46' (yellow card) 50'; Jonathan 58'; Mauro dos Santos (yellow card) 59' (red card) 74'; Thomas (yellow card) 90'	Report	16' Nolito; 39' (yellow card) 67' Santi Mina; (yellow card) 50' Hugo Mallo; (red card) 54' Cabral; (yellow card) 54' Larrivey	Stadium: Juegos Mediterráneos; Attendance: 10,898; Referee: Teixeira Vitiennes

10 May 2015 36	Almería	1 – 2	Málaga	Almería
19:00 CET	Partey 31'; Casado (yellow card) 42'; Soriano (yellow card) 69'; Dubarbier (yellow card) 86'	Report	23' (o.g.) Casado; (yellow card) 34' Weligton; 69' Javi Guerra; (yellow card) 72' Amrabat; (yellow card) 78' Samu; (yellow card) 90+2' Recio	Stadium: Juegos Mediterráneos; Attendance: 10,690; Referee: Prieto Iglesias

17 May 2015 37	Sevilla	2 – 1	Almería	Seville
19:00 CET	Iborra 65' 70'	Report	29' Thievy; (yellow card) 67' Rubén; (yellow card) 72' Thomas; (red card) 74' Trujillo; (yellow card) 82' Dubarbier	Stadium: Sánchez Pizjuán; Attendance: 32,511; Referee: Bikandi Garrido

24 May 2015 38	Almería	2 – 3	Valencia	Almería
18:30	Thomas 9'; Soriano 36'; Casado (yellow card) 68'; Wellington Silva (yellow card) 75'	Report	28' Otamendi; (yellow card) 34' Barragán; 44' (yellow card) 75' Feghouli; (yellow card) 68' (red card) 87' Parejo; 80' Alcácer; (yellow card) 85' Gayà; (yellow card) 88' Fuego	Stadium: Juegos Mediterráneos; Attendance: 11,429; Referee: Hernández Hernández

=== Copa del Rey ===
5 December 2014 Round of 32	Betis	3 – 4	Almería	Seville
22:00	Perquis (yellow card) 35' (goal) 84'; Caro (yellow card) 58'; Casado (yellow card) 62'; Rubén Castro 79'; Molina 89'	Report	3' Mané; 5' (yellow card) 57' Teerasil; 29' Quique; (yellow card) 46' Iván; 61' Édgar	Stadium: Benito Villamarín; Attendance: 2,000; Referee: Juan Martínez Munuera

16 December 2014 Round of 32	Almería	2 – 1	Betis	Almería
22:00	Michel (yellow card) 8' (goal) 58'; Thievy (yellow card) 46'; Trujillo (yellow card) 70'; Jonathan 74'; Corona (yellow card) 84'	Report	(yellow card) 49' (goal) 78' Perquis; (yellow card) 60' Piccini	Stadium: Juegos Mediterráneos; Attendance: 4,133; Referee: Velasco Carballo

7 January 2015 Round of 16	Almería	1 – 1	Getafe	Almería
22:00	Antonio Marín (yellow card) 53'; Verza 60'; Wellington Silva (yellow card) 74'	Report	21' (o.g.) Verza; (yellow card) 30' Velázquez; (yellow card) 34' Roberto Lago; (yellow card) 44' Diego Castro; (yellow card) 86' Naldo	Stadium: Juegos Mediterráneos; Attendance: 3,196; Referee: González González

14 January 2015 Round of 16	Getafe	1 – 0	Almería	Getafe
20:00	Escudero (yellow card) 54'; Álvaro Vázquez 75'	Report	(yellow card) 24' Azeez; (yellow card) 76' Thomas; (yellow card) 86' Michel	Stadium: Coliseum Alfonso Pérez; Attendance: 2,500; Referee: Álvarez Izquierdo
