= Édgar Méndez =

Spanish footballer (born 1990)

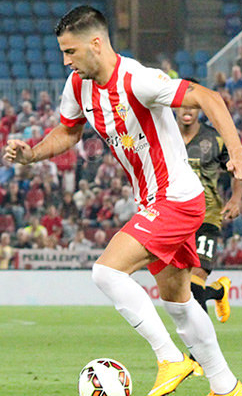
- Méndez with Almería in 2014

Personal information
- Full name: Édgar Antonio Méndez Ortega
- Date of birth: 2 January 1990 (age 36)
- Place of birth: Arafo, Spain
- Height: 1.87 m (6 ft 2 in)
- Position: Winger

Team information
- Current team: PT Prachuap
- Number: 17

Youth career
- Tenerife
- 2006–2007: Murcia Deportivo
- 2007–2009: Real Madrid

Senior career*
Years	Team	Apps	(Gls)
2008–2009	Real Madrid C	23	(1)
2009–2010	Atlético Ciudad	30	(0)
2010–2011	Betis B	20	(0)
2011–2012	Melilla	35	(7)
2012–2013	Almería B	32	(6)
2013–2015	Almería	30	(4)
2013–2014	→ Jaén (loan)	17	(0)
2014	→ Tenerife (loan)	14	(1)
2015–2016	Granada	15	(1)
2016–2017	Alavés	27	(4)
2017–2020	Cruz Azul	79	(12)
2020–2022	Alavés	81	(7)
2022–2024	Necaxa	57	(12)
2024–2025	Bengaluru	27	(9)
2025–	PT Prachuap	23	(13)
- * Club domestic league appearances and goals as of 13:31, 26 September 2026 (UTC)

Édgar Antonio Méndez Ortega (born 2 January 1990) is a Spanish professional footballer who plays as a left winger for Thai League 1 club PT Prachuap.

He achieved La Liga figures of 153 games and 16 goals over six seasons, with Almería, Granada and Alavés. He also played in Mexico, India and Thailand, mainly in service of Cruz Azul.

== Club career ==
Born in Arafo, Province of Santa Cruz de Tenerife, Méndez finished his apprenticeship with Real Madrid and made his senior debut in the 2008–09 season with the C team, in the Tercera División. He upgraded to Segunda División B with CF Atlético Ciudad in summer 2009, and joined Betis Deportivo also in that league for the following campaign.

Méndez signed for UD Melilla still in the third tier in July 2011, and scored seven goals in his only season. In 2012 he moved to UD Almería, being assigned to the reserves.

On 20 July 2013, Méndez joined Andalusia neighbours Real Jaén in a season-long loan deal. He made his debut as a professional on 25 August, playing the full 90 minutes in a 4–2 away defeat against CD Numancia in the Segunda División.

On 28 January 2014, Méndez moved to CD Tenerife also in a temporary deal. He scored his first goal in the second division on 23 March, closing the 5–0 home rout of SD Ponferradina.

In June 2014, Méndez returned to Almería and renewed his contract with the club on 16 August, being definitely promoted to the first-team squad in La Liga. He made his debut in the competition on 23 August, starting and assisting Fernando Soriano in a 1–1 home draw with RCD Espanyol.

Méndez scored his first goal in the Spanish top flight on 12 September 2014, opening the 1–1 home draw against Córdoba CF. On 7 October, he agreed to an extension until 2018.

On 1 July 2015, Méndez signed a four-year deal with neighbouring Granada CF after suffering relegation with Almería. In July 2016, he terminated his contract after being sparingly used, and joined fellow top-tier team Deportivo Alavés for three years.

On 8 February 2017, in the second leg of the semi-finals of the Copa del Rey, Méndez scored the only goal of the tie against RC Celta de Vigo, qualifying the Basques for the decisive match for the first time in their 91-year history; he came on as a 79th-minute substitute for Gaizka Toquero, and scored just three minutes later.

Méndez moved abroad on 4 July 2017, joining Mexican side Cruz Azul. On 31 January 2020, having won three titles, he signed a two-and-a-half-year contract with his former club Alavés.

Méndez returned to the Liga MX in June 2022, agreeing to a deal at Club Necaxa. He switched to the Indian Super League two years later, jonining Bengaluru FC.

== Career statistics ==
As of match played 23 May 2021

Club	Season	Competition	League		Cup		Continental		Other		Total	
Club	Season	Competition	Apps	Goals	Apps	Goals	Apps	Goals	Apps	Goals	Apps	Goals
Real Madrid C	2008–09	Tercera División	23	1	—		—		—		23	1
Atlético Ciudad	2009–10	Segunda División B	30	0	2	0	—		—		32	0
Betis B	2010–11	Segunda División B	20	0	—		—		0	0	20	0
Melilla	2011–12	Segunda División B	35	7	1	0	—		—		36	7
Almería B	2012–13	Segunda División B	32	6	—		—		—		32	6
Almería	2014–15	La Liga	30	4	1	1	—		—		31	5
Jaén (loan)	2013–14	Segunda División	17	0	2	0	—		—		19	0
Tenerife (loan)	2013–14	Segunda División	14	1	0	0	—		—		14	1
Granada	2015–16	La Liga	15	1	3	0	—		—		18	1
Alavés	2016–17	La Liga	27	4	6	4	—		—		33	8
Cruz Azul	2017–18	Liga MX	28	8	7	1	—		—		35	9
Cruz Azul	2018–19	Liga MX	39	4	11	2	3 (Note: Appearances in Leagues Cup)	0	1 (Note: Appearance in Campeón de Campeones)	0	54	6
Cruz Azul	2019–20	Liga MX	12	0	0	0	—		—		12	0
Cruz Azul	Total		79	12	18	3	3	0	1	0	101	15
Alavés	2019–20	La Liga	16	1	0	0	—		—		16	1
Alavés	2020–21	La Liga	33	5	3	0	—		—		36	5
Alavés	Total		76	10	9	4	0	0	0	0	85	14
Career totals			371	42	36	8	3	0	1	0	411	50

== Honours ==
Cruz Azul

- Copa MX: Apertura 2018
- Supercopa MX: 2019
- Leagues Cup: 2019
