= 2016–17 Deportivo Alavés season =

Alavés
2016–17 season
- President: Alfonso Fernández de Trocóniz
- Head coach: Mauricio Pellegrino
- Stadium: Mendizorrotza
- La Liga: 9th
- Copa del Rey: Runner-up
- Highest home attendance: 19,840 vs Real Madrid (29 October 2016)
- Lowest home attendance: 11,043 vs Gimnàstic (22 December 2016)
- Average home league attendance: 15,268 (includes Copa del Rey)
- Biggest win: Gimnàstic 0–3 Alavés (1 December 2016); Alavés 3–0 Gimnàstic (22 December 2016)
- Biggest defeat: Alavés 0–6 Barcelona (11 February 2017)
Home colours	Away colours
- All statistics correct as of 27 May 2017.

The 2016–17 Deportivo Alavés season is the club's 95th year in existence and its 12th season in the top flight of Spanish football. Alavés is involved in two competitions after promoting from the Segunda División during the last season.

== Squad ==
As of 31 January 2017

Note: Flags indicate national team as defined under FIFA eligibility rules; some limited exceptions apply. Players may hold more than one non-FIFA nationality.

No.	Pos.	Nation	Player
1	GK	ESP	Fernando Pacheco
2	DF	BRA	Rodrigo Ely (on loan from Milan)
3	DF	ESP	Raúl García
4	DF	ESP	Alexis
5	DF	ESP	Víctor Laguardia
6	MF	ESP	Marcos Llorente (on loan from Real Madrid)
7	FW	ESP	Rubén Sobrino (on loan from Manchester City)
8	MF	ESP	Víctor Camarasa (on loan from Levante)
9	FW	VEN	Christian Santos
10	MF	PAR	Óscar Romero (on loan from Shanghai Shenhua)
11	MF	ESP	Ibai
12	MF	ESP	Sergio Llamas
13	GK	ESP	Adrián Ortolá (on loan from Barcelona)

No.	Pos.	Nation	Player
15	DF	FRA	Théo Hernandez (on loan from Atlético Madrid)
16	MF	COL	Daniel Torres
17	MF	ESP	Édgar
18	FW	ESP	Gaizka Toquero
19	MF	ESP	Manu García (Captain)
20	FW	BRA	Deyverson (on loan from Levante)
21	MF	ESP	Kiko Femenía
22	DF	ESP	Carlos Vigaray
23	MF	SRB	Nenad Krstičić
24	DF	MAR	Zouhair Feddal
25	MF	SRB	Aleksandar Katai
27	DF	ESP	Einar Galilea
28	FW	ESP	Dani Iglesias

== Competitions ==
=== Overall ===
Competition	Started round	Current position / round	Final position / round	First match	Last match
La Liga	Matchday 1	—	9th	21 August 2016	21 May 2017
Copa del Rey	Round of 32	—	Runner-up	1 December 2016	27 May 2017

Updated to match played 27 May 2017
Source: Competitions

=== Overview ===
Competition	Record							
Competition	Pld	W	D	L	GF	GA	GD	Win %
La Liga	38	14	13	11	41	43	−2	36.84
Copa del Rey	9	4	4	1	13	6	+7	44.44
Total	47	18	17	12	54	49	+5	38.30

Last updated: 27 May 2017
Source: Competitions

=== La Liga ===
==== League table ====
Pos	Team	Pld	W	D	L	GF	GA	GD	Pts	Qualification or relegation
7	Athletic Bilbao	38	19	6	13	53	43	+10	63	Qualification for the Europa League third qualifying round
8	Espanyol	38	15	11	12	49	50	−1	56	
9	Alavés	38	14	13	11	41	43	−2	55	
10	Eibar	38	15	9	14	56	51	+5	54	
11	Málaga	38	12	10	16	49	55	−6	46 (Note: Málaga ahead of Valencia on head-to-head points: Valencia–Málaga 2–2, Málaga–Valencia 2–0)	

Source: La Liga, Soccerway
Rules for classification: 1) Points; 2) Head-to-head points; 3) Head-to-head goal difference; 4) Goal difference; 5) Goals scored; 6) Fair-play points; 7) Play-off.

==== Results summary ====
Overall								Home						Away					
Pld	W	D	L	GF	GA	GD	Pts	W	D	L	GF	GA	GD	W	D	L	GF	GA	GD
38	14	13	11	41	43	−2	55	7	8	4	19	21	−2	7	5	7	22	22	0

Last updated: 20 May 2017.
Source: Competitive matches

==== Matches ====
21 August 2016 1	Atlético Madrid	1–1	Alavés	Madrid
22:15 CEST (UTC+02:00)	Gameiro 90+3' (pen.)	Report	Édgar (yellow card) 87'; Ibai (yellow card) 88'; Laguardia (yellow card) 90+1'; Camarasa (yellow card) 90+1'; M. García 90+5'	Stadium: Vicente Calderón; Attendance: 36,455; Referee: Ignacio Iglesias Villanueva

28 August 2016 2	Alavés	0–0	Sporting Gijón	Vitoria-Gasteiz
18:15 CEST (UTC+02:00)	Deyverson (yellow card) 27'	Report	Gómez (yellow card) 66'	Stadium: Mendizorrotza; Attendance: 14,030; Referee: José Luis Munuera Montero

10 September 2016 3	Barcelona	1–2	Alavés	Barcelona
20:30 CEST (UTC+02:00)	Mathieu 46'; Mascherano (yellow card) 55'	Report	Deyverson 39'; Ibai 64'; R. García (yellow card) 72'	Stadium: Camp Nou; Attendance: 74,237; Referee: Mario Melero López

19 September 2016 4	Alavés	0–0	Deportivo La Coruña	Vitoria-Gasteiz
20:45 CEST (UTC+02:00)	Alexis (yellow card) 8'; Deyverson (yellow card) 57'; R. García (yellow card) 79'	Report	Gama (yellow card) 24'; Arribas (yellow card) 67'; Albentosa (yellow card) 75'; Andone (yellow card) 88'	Stadium: Mendizorrotza; Attendance: 14,637; Referee: Juan Martínez Munuera

21 September 2016 5	Valencia	2–1	Alavés	Valencia
22:00 CEST (UTC+02:00)	Laguardia 28' (o.g.); Mangala (yellow card) 56'; Parejo 88' (pen.); Alves (yellow card) 90+1'	Report	Toquero 45'; Torres (yellow card) 57'; Hernandez (yellow card) 77'; Alexis (yellow card) 87'; Femenía (yellow card) 88'	Stadium: Mestalla; Attendance: 32,347; Referee: Santiago Jaime Latre

26 September 2016 6	Alavés	3–1	Granada	Vitoria-Gasteiz
20:45 CEST (UTC+02:00)	Alexis (yellow card) 35'; Édgar 52'; Laguardia (yellow card) 63'; Camarasa 66'; Deyverson 90+3', (yellow card) 90+3'	Report	Agbo (yellow card) 26'; Márquez (yellow card) 58'; Carcela (yellow card) 64'; Kravets 78'	Stadium: Mendizorrotza; Attendance: 16,371; Referee: José González González

1 October 2016 7	Sevilla	2–1	Alavés	Seville
16:15 CEST (UTC+02:00)	Mercado (yellow card) 33'; Ben Yedder 74', 90'; Mariano (yellow card) 90+6'	Report	Hernandez (yellow card) 37'; Alexis (yellow card) 41'; Llorente (yellow card) 65'; R. García (yellow card) 78'; M. García (yellow card) 82'; Laguardia 84'; Édgar (yellow card) 89'	Stadium: Ramón Sánchez Pizjuán; Attendance: 32,122; Referee: Antonio Mateu Lahoz

16 October 2016 8	Alavés	1–1	Málaga	Vitoria-Gasteiz
12:00 CEST (UTC+02:00)	Deyverson 9'; M. García (yellow card) 66'; Hernandez (red card) 90'; Camarasa (yellow card) 90+1'	Report	Roberto Rosales (yellow card) 58', (goal) 85'; En-Nesyri (yellow card) 68'; Sandro (yellow card) 70'; Juanpi (yellow card) 70' (red card) 90+4'	Stadium: Mendizorrotza; Attendance: 14,420; Referee: Alejandro Hernández Hernández

22 October 2016 9	Real Sociedad	3–0	Alavés	San Sebastián
18:30 CEST (UTC+02:00)	Prieto 22'; C. Martínez (yellow card) 33'; Berchiche (yellow card) 39'; Willian José (yellow card) 43', (goal) 57'; Vela 87'	Report	Feddal (yellow card) 22'; Deyverson (yellow card) 38'; Katai (yellow card) 45+1'; Santos (yellow card) 54'; Édgar (yellow card) 89'	Stadium: Anoeta; Attendance: 24,224; Referee: Carlos Clos Gómez

29 October 2016 10	Alavés	1–4	Real Madrid	Vitoria-Gasteiz
16:15 CEST (UTC+02:00)	Deyverson 7', (yellow card) 16'; Torres (yellow card) 39'; Hernandez (yellow card) 52'; Femenía (yellow card) 80'; Krstičić (yellow card) 86'	Report	Ronaldo 17' (pen.), 33', 88'; Bale (yellow card) 60'; Morata 84'	Stadium: Mendizorrotza; Attendance: 19,840; Referee: José María Sánchez Martínez

5 November 2016 11	Osasuna	0–1	Alavés	Pamplona
18:30 CEST (UTC+02:00)	U. García (yellow card) 17'; Tienza (yellow card) 65'; D. García (yellow card) 75'; Flaño (yellow card) 90'; Oier (yellow card) 90+2'	Report	Toquero (yellow card) 73'; Santos 77'; Espinoza (yellow card) 89'	Stadium: El Sadar; Attendance: 15,929; Referee: Daniel Ocón Arráiz

20 November 2016 12	Alavés	0–1	Espanyol	Vitoria-Gasteiz
13:00 CET (UTC+01:00)	Feddal (yellow card) 26'; Femenía (yellow card) 47'; Camarasa (yellow card) 57'; Deyverson (yellow card) 60'; Alexis (yellow card) 78'	Report	Pérez (yellow card) 15'; Sánchez (yellow card) 60'; Gerrard 81'	Stadium: Mendizorrotza; Attendance: 19,550; Referee: Mario Melero López

27 November 2016 13	Villarreal	0–2	Alavés	Vilarreal
12:00 CET (UTC+01:00)	Costa (yellow card) 12'; Bruno (yellow card) 22'	Report	Ibai 8'; Camarasa 17'; Torres (yellow card) 55'; Feddal (yellow card) 56'; Pantić (yellow card) 66'	Stadium: El Madrigal; Attendance: 15,629; Referee: Alberto Undiano Mallenco

4 December 2016 14	Alavés	1–1	Las Palmas	Vitoria-Gasteiz
18:30 CET (UTC+01:00)	Alexis 4', (yellow card) 76'; Hernandez (yellow card) 66'; M. García (yellow card) 66'	Report	Lopes (yellow card) 9'; Livaja (yellow card) 26', (goal) 57'; Michel (yellow card) 54'	Stadium: Mendizorrotza; Attendance: 18,724; Referee: David Fernández Borbalán

11 December 2016 15	Eibar	0–0	Alavés	Eibar
12:00 CET (UTC+01:00)	Escalante (yellow card) 29'	Report	Femenía (yellow card) 19'	Stadium: Ipurua; Attendance: 5,666; Referee: Daniel Trujillo Suárez

16 December 2016 16	Alavés	1–0	Real Betis	Vitoria-Gasteiz
20:45 CET (UTC+01:00)	Deyverson (yellow card) 18', (goal) 58'; Camarasa (yellow card) 35'; Llorente (yellow card) 53'; Hernandez (yellow card) 55'; Pacheco (yellow card) 73'; M. García (yellow card) 90+4'	Report	Ceballos (yellow card) 55'	Stadium: Mendizorrotza; Attendance: 18,067; Referee: Ignacio Iglesias Villanueva

8 January 2017 17	Athletic Bilbao	0–0	Alavés	Bilbao
12:00 CET (UTC+01:00)	Aduriz (yellow card) 45'; Rico (yellow card) 45'	Report	Laguardia (yellow card) 62'; Feddal (yellow card) 64'; Deyverson (yellow card) 89'; Torres (yellow card) 90+3'	Stadium: San Mamés; Attendance: 42,182; Referee: Carlos del Cerro Grande

15 January 2016 18	Celta Vigo	1–0	Alavés	Vigo
16:15 CET (UTC+01:00)	Cabral (yellow card) 11'; Wass (yellow card) 79'; Radoja 89'; Jonny (yellow card) 90+3'; Fontàs (yellow card) 90+4'	Report	Femenía (yellow card) 20'; Feddal (yellow card) 22' (yellow-red card) 46'; Édgar (yellow card) 66'; Hernandez (yellow card) 84'	Stadium: Balaídos; Attendance: 15,723; Referee: Mario Melero López

21 January 2017 19	Alavés	2–2	Leganés	Vitoria-Gasteiz
18:30 CET (UTC+01:00)	Hernandez (yellow card) 2'; Laguardia 11'; Gómez (yellow card) 18'; Édgar 51'; Alexis (yellow card) 90+1'	Report	Guerrero 45'; Gabriel (yellow card) 82'; Insua 84'; Pérez (yellow card) 90+3'	Stadium: Mendizorrotza; Attendance: 19,126; Referee: José Luis Munuera Montero

28 January 2016 20	Alavés	0–0	Atlético Madrid	Vitoria-Gasteiz
16:15 CET (UTC+01:00)	Llorente (yellow card) 54'; Deyverson (yellow card) 82'; M. García (yellow card) 90+4'	Report	Giménez (yellow card) 45'; Godín (yellow card) 90+4'	Stadium: Mendizorrotza; Attendance: 19,152; Referee: Daniel Ocón Arráiz

5 February 2017 21	Sporting Gijón	2–4	Alavés	Gijón
16:15	Vesga (yellow card) 39'; Afif (yellow card) 44'; Amorebieta (yellow card) 68'; Cuéllar (yellow card) 69'; Carmona (yellow card) 71'; Cases (yellow card) 75'; Traoré (yellow card) 75', (goal) 84'; Castro 90'	Report	Sobrino 10'; Katai (yellow card) 20'; Krstičić (yellow card) 23'; Santos (yellow card) 45+1', (goal) 58' (pen.); Édgar 70' (pen.); Alexis 85'	Stadium: El Molinón; Attendance: 21,752; Referee: Jesús Gil Manzano

11 February 2017 22	Alavés	0–6	Barcelona	Vitoria-Gasteiz
16:15	Laguardia (yellow card) 90+3'	Report	Umtiti (yellow card) 6'; L. Suárez 37', 67'; Neymar 40'; Messi 59'; Busquets (yellow card) 59'; Rakitić (yellow card) 61', (goal) 65'; Alexis 63' (o.g.)	Stadium: Mendizorrotza; Attendance: 19,840; Referee: Carlos Clos Gómez

18 February 2017 23	Deportivo La Coruña	0–1	Alavés	A Coruña
18:30	Guilherme (yellow card) 33'; Albentosa (yellow card) 67'; Gama (yellow card) 80'; Lux (yellow card) 86'; Gil (yellow card) 90+5'	Report	Llorente (yellow card) 42'; Deyverson (yellow card) 51'; M. García 68'; Sobrino (yellow card) 90+3'	Stadium: Riazor; Attendance: 19,753; Referee: Santiago Jaime Latre

25 February 2017 24	Alavés	2–1	Valencia	Vitoria-Gasteiz
13:00	M. García (yellow card) 18'; Llorente (yellow card) 41'; Hernandez (yellow card) 42'; Laguardia (yellow card) 68'; Ibai 78'; Katai 86'	Report	Cancelo (yellow card) 16'; Soler 70', (yellow card) 75'; Orellana (yellow card) 77' (yellow-red card) 88'	Stadium: Mendizorrotza; Attendance: 19,118; Referee: Mario Melero López

1 March 2017 25	Granada	2–1	Alavés	Granada
21:30 CET	Wakaso 38'; Carcela (yellow card) 45'; Cuenca 53', (yellow card) 90+3'; Uche (yellow card) 78'; Héctor (yellow card) 81'; Gastón Silva (yellow card) 83'; Ingason (yellow card) 90+1'	Report	Vigaray (yellow card) 12'; Romero (yellow card) 24'; Torres (yellow card) 30'; Camarasa 57'; Katai (yellow card) 90+1' (red card) 90+3'; Alexis (yellow card) 90+4' (yellow-red card) 90+4'; Hernandez (yellow card) 90+6'	Stadium: Los Cármenes; Attendance: 14,110; Referee: Ignacio Iglesias Villanueva

6 March 2017 26	Alavés	1–1	Sevilla	Vitoria-Gasteiz
20:45 CET	Toquero (yellow card) 29'; Katai 75'; Hernandez (yellow card) 87'	Report	Lenglet (yellow card) 20'; Ben Yedder 23'; Kranevitter (yellow card) 31'; Iborra (yellow card) 68'; Vitolo (yellow card) 73'; Mariano (yellow card) 83'	Stadium: Mendizorrotza; Attendance: 18,479; Referee: Daniel Trujillo Suárez

11 March 2017 27	Málaga	1–2	Alavés	Málaga
18:30 CET	Camacho (yellow card) 65'; Juan Carlos 71'; Demichelis (yellow card) 76'	Report	Feddal 39', (yellow card) 56' (yellow-red card) 72'; Deyverson (yellow card) 83'; Édgar 90+1'	Stadium: La Rosaleda; Attendance: 23,716; Referee: Alberto Undiano Mallenco

18 March 2017 28	Alavés	1–0	Real Sociedad	Vitoria-Gasteiz
18:30 CET	Ely (yellow card) 40'; Deyverson 44', (yellow card) 56'; M. García (yellow card) 81'	Report	Granero (yellow card) 59' (yellow-red card) 67'; Juanmi (yellow card) 70'; Vela (yellow card) 80'; Rulli (yellow card) 90+3'	Stadium: Mendizorrotza; Attendance: 19,840; Referee: Carlos del Cerro Grande

2 April 2017 29	Real Madrid	3–0	Alavés	Madrid
16:15 CEST	Benzema 31'; Isco 85'; Nacho 88'	Report	Ely (yellow card) 17'; M. García (yellow card) 87'	Stadium: Santiago Bernabéu; Attendance: 69,586; Referee: José María Sánchez Martínez

5 April 2017 30	Alavés	0–1	Osasuna	Vitoria-Gasteiz
20:30	Torres (yellow card) 35'; Romero (yellow card) 50'; R. García (yellow card) 62'; Ely (yellow card) 80'; Femenía (yellow card) 82'	Report	Oier (yellow card) 32'; Berenguer 88'	Stadium: Mendizorrotza; Attendance: 18,344; Referee: Xavier Estrada Fernández

8 April 2017 31	Espanyol	1–0	Alavés	Barcelona
13:00	Piatti 56'; J. López (yellow card) 73'; Diego López (yellow card) 90+1'; Sánchez (yellow card) 90+2'	Report	Édgar (yellow card) 51'; Feddal (yellow card) 90+1'; Laguardia (yellow card) 90+2'	Stadium: RCDE Stadium; Attendance: 17,521; Referee: Mario Melero López

17 April 2017 32	Alavés	2–1	Villarreal	Vitoria-Gasteiz
20:45 CEST	Ibai 35'; Ely 45'; Toquero (yellow card) 61'; Hernandez (yellow card) 90+2'	Report	Bakambu (yellow card) 26', (goal) 70'; Musacchio (yellow card) 44'; Soriano (yellow card) 66'; Costa (yellow card) 90+2'	Stadium: Mendizorrotza; Attendance: 17,831; Referee: Alfonso Álvarez Izquierdo

23 April 2017 33	Las Palmas	1–1	Alavés	Las Palmas
18:30 CEST	Mesa (yellow card) 22'; Boateng 44'; Michel (yellow card) 73'; D. García (yellow card) 77'; Livaja (red card) 86'; Montoro (yellow card) 90+3'	Report	Deyverson (yellow card) 56'; Ibai 61'	Stadium: Gran Canaria; Attendance: 16,007; Referee: José Luis Munuera Montero

27 April 2017 34	Alavés	0–0	Eibar	Vitoria-Gasteiz
19:30 CEST	M. García (yellow card) 41'; Feddal (yellow card) 45+1'; Hernandez (yellow card) 72'; Ely (yellow card) 87'	Report	Rivera (yellow card) 22'; Kike (yellow card) 23'; Riesgo (red card) 26'	Stadium: Mendizorrotza; Attendance: 18,277; Referee: Daniel Trujillo Suárez

30 April 2017 35	Real Betis	1–4	Alavés	Seville
16:15 CEST	Pardo 12'; Alegría (yellow card) 88'	Report	Alexis (yellow card) 19'; Romero (yellow card) 21'; Torres (yellow card) 24'; Krstičić 48', (yellow card) 81'; Sobrino 54'; Santos 58'; Édgar (yellow card) 90+3'; Katai 90+4'	Stadium: Estadio Benito Villamarín; Attendance: 22,271; Referee: Daniel Ocón Arráiz

7 May 2017 36	Alavés	1–0	Athletic Bilbao	Vitoria-Gasteiz
12:00 CEST	Deyverson (yellow card) 36'; Hernandez 53'	Report	Balenziaga (yellow card) 14'; Muniain (yellow card) 41'; San José (yellow card) 56'; Laporte (yellow card) 84'	Stadium: Mendizorrotza; Attendance: 19,127; Referee: Juan Martínez Munuera

14 May 2017 37	Alavés	3–1	Celta Vigo	Vitoria-Gasteiz
16:00 CEST	M. García 5'; Feddal 18'; Deyverson 37'; Alexis (yellow card) 63'	Report	Aspas 78' (pen.), (yellow card) 81'; Fontàs (yellow card) 84'; Jonny (yellow card) 87'	Stadium: Mendizorrotza; Attendance: 19,540; Referee: José Luis Munuera Montero

20 May 2017 38	Leganés	1–1	Alavés	Leganés
19:00 CEST	Timor 89'	Report	R. García (yellow card) 45'; Krstičić 64'	Stadium: Butarque; Attendance: 9,491; Referee: José González González

=== Copa del Rey ===
==== Round of 32 ====
1 December 2016 First leg	Gimnàstic	0–3	Alavés	Tarragona
21:00 CET (UTC+01:00)	Boiro (yellow card) 26'; Delgado (yellow card) 61'; Bouzón (yellow card) 63'; Maloku (yellow card) 71'; Kakabadze (yellow card) 90+2'	Report	Toquero 15', 52'; Santos 63', (yellow card) 83'	Stadium: Nou Estadi; Attendance: 3,032; Referee: Santiago Jaime Latre

22 December 2016 Second leg	Alavés	3–0 (6–0 agg.)	Gimnàstic	Vitoria-Gasteiz
20:00 CET (UTC+01:00)	Édgar 12'; Sobrino 31'; Krstičić 40'; Katai (yellow card) 54'	Report	Kakabadze (yellow card) 27' (red card) 30'; Cordero (yellow card) 56'	Stadium: Mendizorrotza; Attendance: 11,043; Referee: Carlos Clos Gómez

==== Round of 16 ====
3 January 2017 First leg	Deportivo La Coruña	2–2	Alavés	A Coruña
21:15 CET (UTC+01:00)	Luisinho (yellow card) 71'; Gama 73', (yellow card) 87'; Joselu 90+3', (yellow card) 90+4'	Report	Santos 3'; Édgar 45' (pen.), (yellow card) 54'; Krstičić (yellow card) 64'	Stadium: Riazor; Attendance: 17,887; Referee: Alejandro Hernández Hernández

11 January 2017 Second leg	Alavés	1–1 ((a) 3–3 agg.)	Deportivo La Coruña	Vitoria-Gasteiz
19:00 CET (UTC+01:00)	Pantić (yellow card) 28'; Torres (yellow card) 35'; Hernandez (yellow card) 40' (red card) 47'; Édgar 45' (yellow card) 81'; Laguardia (yellow card) 90'	Report	Borges (yellow card) 16'; Arribas 62'; Guilherme (yellow card) 90+3'	Stadium: Mendizorrotza; Attendance: 16,765; Referee: Xavier Estrada Fernández

==== Quarter-finals ====
18 January 2017 First leg	Alcorcón	0–2	Alavés	Alcorcón
19:15 CET	Rodríguez (yellow card) 45'; Nélson (yellow card) 60'; Bellvís (yellow card) 90+1'	Report	García (yellow card) 40'; Katai (yellow card) 76'; Pantić (yellow card) 80'; Ibai 90', 90+4'	Stadium: Santo Domingo; Attendance: 3,398; Referee: Alfonso Javier Álvarez Izquierdo

24 January 2017 Second leg	Alavés	0–0 (2–0 agg.)	Alcorcón	Vitoria-Gasteiz
19:15 CET	Alexis (yellow card) 68'; Vigaray (yellow card) 73'	Report		Stadium: Mendizorrotza; Attendance: 11,287; Referee: I. Iglesias Villanueva

==== Semi-finals ====
2 February 2017 First leg	Celta Vigo	0–0	Alavés	Vigo
21:00 CET	Bongonda (yellow card) 33'	Report	Llorente (yellow card) 60'; Camarasa (yellow card) 67'	Stadium: Balaídos; Attendance: 18,989; Referee: José Luis González González

8 February 2017 Second leg	Alavés	1–0 (1–0 agg.)	Celta Vigo	Vitoria-Gasteiz
21:00 CET	Feddal (yellow card) 39'; Édgar 82'; Hernandez (yellow card) 90+7'	Report	Aspas (yellow card) 39'; Díaz (yellow card) 53'	Stadium: Mendizorrotza; Attendance: 19,307; Referee: Antonio Mateu Lahoz

==== Final ====
27 May 2017 Final	Barcelona	3–1	Alavés	Madrid
21:30 CEST	Messi 30', (yellow card) 76'; Umtiti (yellow card) 42'; Neymar 45'; Alcácer 45+3'; Iniesta (yellow card) 76'	Report	Édgar (yellow card) 16'; Hernandez 33'; M. García (yellow card) 39'; Ely (yellow card) 49'; Sobrino (yellow card) 76'; Deyverson (yellow card) 88'	Stadium: Vicente Calderón; Attendance: 50,000; Referee: Carlos Clos Gómez

== Statistics ==
=== Appearances and goals ===
Last updated on 27 May 2017.

No.	Pos	Nat	Player	Total		La Liga		Copa del Rey	
No.	Pos	Nat	Player	Apps	Goals	Apps	Goals	Apps	Goals
Goalkeepers
1	GK	(Spain) ESP	Fernando Pacheco	39	0	36	0	3	0
13	GK	(Spain) ESP	Adrián Ortolá	8	0	2	0	6	0
Defenders
2	DF	(Brazil) BRA	Rodrigo Ely	11	0	8+2	0	1	0
3	DF	(Spain) ESP	Raúl García	22	0	14+4	0	3+1	0
4	DF	(Spain) ESP	Alexis	28	2	19+5	2	3+1	0
5	DF	(Spain) ESP	Víctor Laguardia	31	2	24+2	2	4+1	0
15	DF	(France) FRA	Théo Hernandez	38	1	30+2	0	6	1
22	DF	(Spain) ESP	Carlos Vigaray	26	0	10+9	0	5+2	0
24	DF	(Morocco) MAR	Zouhair Feddal	33	2	27	2	6	0
27	DF	(Spain) ESP	Einar Galilea	0	0	0	0	0	0
Midfielders
6	MF	(Spain) ESP	Marcos Llorente	38	0	31+1	0	5+1	0
8	MF	(Spain) ESP	Víctor Camarasa	37	3	28+3	3	3+3	0
10	MF	(Paraguay) PAR	Óscar Romero	15	0	4+9	0	0+2	0
11	MF	(Spain) ESP	Ibai Gómez	35	7	23+6	5	3+3	2
12	MF	(Spain) ESP	Sergio Llamas	0	0	0	0	0	0
16	MF	(Colombia) COL	Daniel Torres	26	0	17+4	0	4+1	0
17	MF	(Spain) ESP	Édgar	33	8	18+9	4	4+2	4
19	MF	(Spain) ESP	Manu García	31	3	23+2	3	5+1	0
21	MF	(Spain) ESP	Kiko Femenía	37	0	28+3	0	5+1	0
23	MF	(Serbia) SRB	Nenad Krstičić	20	3	9+5	2	6	1
25	MF	(Serbia) SRB	Aleksandar Katai	26	3	8+12	3	6	0
26	MF	(Spain) ESP	Manu García	1	0	0	0	0+1	0
Forwards
7	FW	(Spain) ESP	Rubén Sobrino	16	3	5+6	2	3+2	1
9	FW	(Venezuela) VEN	Christian Santos	27	5	8+13	3	6	2
18	FW	(Spain) ESP	Gaizka Toquero	28	2	15+8	0	4+1	2
20	FW	(Brazil) BRA	Deyverson	37	7	29+3	7	3+2	0
28	FW	(Spain) ESP	Dani Iglesias	0	0	0	0	0	0
Players who have made an appearance or had a squad number this season but have left the club
2	DF	(Serbia) SRB	Aleksandar Pantić	6	0	1+1	0	4	0
14	MF	(Argentina) ARG	Cristian Espinoza	8	0	1+5	0	1+1	0
10	FW	(Spain) ESP	Manu Barreiro	1	0	0	0	0+1	0
