= Dani Romera =

Spanish footballer (born 1995)

Personal information
- Full name: Daniel Romera Andújar
- Date of birth: 23 August 1995 (age 31)
- Place of birth: Almería, Spain
- Height: 1.72 m (5 ft 8 in)
- Position: Forward

Team information
- Current team: Borac Banja Luka
- Number: 99

Youth career
- 1999–2011: La Cañada
- 2011–2013: Almería

Senior career*
Years	Team	Apps	(Gls)
2011–2015	Almería B	76	(26)
2013–2015	Almería	6	(0)
2015–2017	Barcelona B	41	(21)
2017–2020	Cádiz	28	(4)
2019	→ Rayo Majadahonda (loan)	13	(2)
2019–2020	→ Alcorcón (loan)	30	(4)
2020–2022	Ponferradina	35	(1)
2022	→ Gimnàstic (loan)	20	(7)
2022–2023	Castellón	14	(7)
2023	Murcia	11	(2)
2023–2024	Ceuta	24	(4)
2024–2025	Hércules	25	(5)
2025	Arenteiro	4	(0)
2026	Rudar Prijedor	14	(8)
2026–	Borac Banja Luka	4	(1)
- * Club domestic league appearances and goals as of 6 September 2026

Daniel 'Dani' Romera Andújar (born 23 August 1995) is a Spanish footballer who plays as a forward for Bosnian Premier League club Borac Banja Luka.

== Club career ==
=== Almería ===
Born in Almería, Andalusia, Romera finished his youth career at UD Almería after starting out at UCD La Cañada Atlético. He made his senior debut with the B team in the 2011–12 season, in Segunda División B.

On 27 April 2013, Romera scored a hat-trick in a 5–2 home rout of La Roda CF. On 30 November he made his first-team – and La Liga – debut, playing the last 19 minutes of the 3–1 away loss against RC Celta de Vigo.

Romera made his second appearance with the main squad on 5 December 2014, in a 4–3 away win over Real Betis in the round of 32 in the Copa del Rey: after coming on as a substitute for Teerasil Dangda, he scored a goal which was later disallowed. He played his second league game on 17 January of the following year, as he featured four minutes in a 3–2 defeat at Valencia CF.

=== Barcelona B ===
On 21 September 2015, Romera signed a three-year deal with another reserve team, FC Barcelona Atlètic also of the third tier. On 1 April 2017, he scored a hat-trick in a 12–0 home demolition of CD Eldense.

=== Cádiz ===
On 17 July 2017, Romera agreed to a four-year contract at Cádiz CF from Segunda División, for a fee of €350,000. On 31 January 2019, having been rarely used during the campaign, he was loaned to CF Rayo Majadahonda of the same league for five months.

Romera moved to second division side AD Alcorcón on 15 August 2019, on a one-year loan.

=== Ponferradina ===
On 22 September 2020, Romera joined SD Ponferradina of the same league. Regularly used in his first season, he did not feature once in the league in the second, being loaned to Primera División RFEF club Gimnàstic de Tarragona on 28 December 2021.

== Career statistics ==
As of match played 6 September 2026

Club	Season	League			National cup (Note: Includes Copa del Rey, Bosnian Cup)		Continental		Other		Total	
Club	Season	Division	Apps	Goals	Apps	Goals	Apps	Goals	Apps	Goals	Apps	Goals
Almería B	2011–12	Segunda División B	3	0	—		—		—		3	0
Almería B	2012–13	Segunda División B	13	6	—		—		—		13	6
Almería B	2013–14	Segunda División B	29	5	—		—		—		29	5
Almería B	2014–15	Segunda División B	31	15	—		—		2 (Note: Appearances in the 2015 Segunda División B play-offs)	0	33	15
Almería B	Total		76	26	—		—		2	0	78	26
Almería	2013–14	La Liga	1	0	0	0	—		—		1	0
Almería	2014–15	La Liga	5	0	3	0	—		—		8	0
Almería	Total		6	0	3	0	—		—		9	0
Barcelona B	2015–16	Segunda División B	12	6	—		—		—		12	6
Barcelona B	2016–17	Segunda División B	29	15	—		—		6 (Note: Appearances in the 2017 Segunda División B play-offs)	3	35	18
Barcelona B	Total		41	21	—		—		6	3	47	24
Cádiz	2017–18	Segunda División	20	2	4	2	—		—		24	4
Cádiz	2018–19	Segunda División	8	2	1	1	—		—		9	3
Cádiz	Total		28	4	5	3	—		—		33	7
Rayo Majadahonda (loan)	2018–19	Segunda División	13	2	0	0	—		—		13	2
Alcorcón (loan)	2019–20	Segunda División	30	4	1	0	—		—		31	4
Ponferradina	2020–21	Segunda División	35	1	1	0	—		—		36	1
Ponferradina	2021–22	Segunda División	0	0	2	1	—		—		2	1
Ponferradina	Total		35	1	3	1	—		—		38	2
Gimnàstic (loan)	2021–22	Primera División RFEF	20	7	—		—		2 (Note: Appearances in 2022 Primera División RFEF play-offs)	0	22	7
Castellón	2022–23	Primera Federación	14	7	—		—		—		14	7
Real Murcia	2022–23	Primera Federación	11	2	—		—		—		11	2
Ceuta	2023–24	Primera Federación	24	4	—		—		2 (Note: Appearances in 2024 Primera Federación play-offs)	0	26	4
Hércules	2024–25	Primera Federación	25	4	—		—		—		25	4
Arenteiro	2025–26	Primera Federación	4	0	—		—		—		4	0
Rudar Prijedor	2025–26	Bosnian Premier League	14	8	1	0	–		–		15	8
Borac Banja Luka	2026–27	Bosnian Premier League	4	1	0	0	1 (Note: Appearance in UEFA Champions League)	0	–		5	1
Career total			345	91	13	4	1	0	12	3	371	98
