= Mauro dos Santos =

Argentine footballer

Personal information
- Full name: Mauro Javier dos Santos
- Date of birth: 7 July 1989 (age 37)
- Place of birth: Santo Tomé, Argentina
- Height: 1.88 m (6 ft 2 in)
- Position: Centre-back

Youth career
- Banfield

Senior career*
Years	Team	Apps	(Gls)
2008–2012	Banfield	68	(0)
2012–2014	Murcia	66	(3)
2014–2015	Almería	29	(1)
2015–2017	Eibar	42	(0)
2017–2018	Leganés	14	(0)
2019–2020	Tenerife	8	(0)
2020	→ Albirex Niigata (loan)	40	(3)
2021	Godoy Cruz	10	(0)
2022	Rajasthan United	15	(0)
2022–2023	El Ejido	23	(1)
2023–2024	Real Avilés	1	(0)

International career
	Argentina U20	5	(0)
- * Club domestic league appearances and goals

Mauro Javier dos Santos (born 7 July 1989), known as Mauro dos Santos, is an Argentine former footballer who played as a defender.

== Club career ==
Born in Santo Tomé, Mauro graduated from Banfield's youth setup, and made his professional debut on 22 June 2008, in a 2–3 away defeat against River Plate. He was handed his first start on 26 October, in a 0–0 draw at Gimnasia LP.

After more than three full seasons with Banfield, Mauro moved abroad, signing a one-year deal with Real Murcia. He made his debut for the club on 21 August 2012, against Córdoba CF. On 24 July of the following year, Mauro renewed his link with the Pimentoneros for a further year, and scored his first professional goal on 29 September, the first of a 2–1 home win against CD Numancia.

On 22 July 2014, Mauro signed a one-year deal with La Liga side UD Almería. He made his debut in the competition on 23 August, starting in a 1–1 home draw against RCD Espanyol.

Mauro scored his first goal in the Spanish top level on 21 September, netting his side's second in a 2–1 away win against Real Sociedad through a header. On 21 July 2015 he moved to fellow league team SD Eibar, after suffering relegation with the Andalusians.

On 11 July 2017, Mauro signed a two-year contract with CD Leganés, still in the top tier. On 26 December 2018, he terminated his contract with the club, and signed a two-and-a-half-year deal with CD Tenerife in the second division the following 8 January.

=== Rajasthan United ===
On 2 February 2022, it was announced that I-League club Rajasthan United signed Mauro on a season-long deal. On 8 March 2022, he made his debut for the club against Aizawl, in a 1–0 win.

=== CD El Ejido ===
In July 2022, CD El Ejido secured the services of Mauro for the upcoming season.

== Career statistics ==
=== Club ===
As of 7 May 2022

Club	Season	League			Cup		Continental		Total	
Club	Season	Division	Apps	Goals	Apps	Goals	Apps	Goals	Apps	Goals
Banfield	2008–09	Primera División	4	0	—				4	0
Banfield	2009–10	Primera División	9	0	—		4	0	13	0
Banfield	2010–11	Primera División	33	0	—		4	0	37	0
Banfield	2011–12	Primera División	22	0	—				22	0
Banfield	Total		68	0	—		8	0	76	0
Murcia	2012–13	Segunda División	29	0	0	0	—		29	0
Murcia	2013–14	Segunda División	37	3	0	0	2	0	39	3
Murcia	Total		66	3	0	0	2	0	68	3
Almería	2014–15	La Liga	29	1	4	0	—		33	1
Almería	Total		29	1	4	0	—		33	1
Eibar	2015–16	La Liga	31	0	2	0	—		33	0
Eibar	2016–17	La Liga	11	0	5	0	—		16	0
Eibar	Total		42	0	7	0	0	0	49	0
Leganés	2017–18	La Liga	14	0	0	0	—		14	0
Tenerife	2018–19	Segunda División	7	0	0	0	—		7	0
Tenerife	2019–20	Segunda División	1	0	1 (Note: Appearance(s) in Copa del Rey)	0	—		2	0
Albirex Niigata (loan)	2020	J2 League	40	3	0	0	—		40	3
Godoy Cruz	2020–21	Primera División	10	0	1 (Note: Appearance(s) in Copa Argentina)	0	—		11	0
Rajasthan United	2021–22	I-League	15	0	0	0	—		15	0
CD El Ejido	2022–23	Segunda Federación	0	0	0	0	—		0	0
Career total			292	7	13	0	10	0	315	7
