= Tomer Hemed =

Israeli footballer

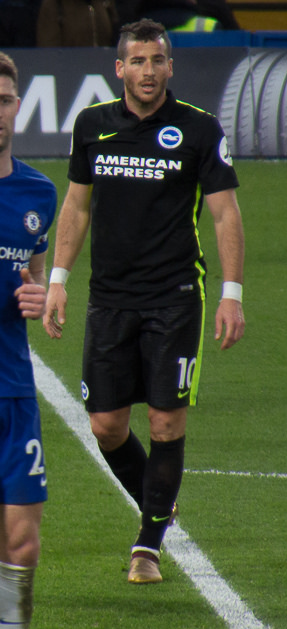
- Hemed playing for Brighton in 2017

Personal information
- Full name: Tomer Hemed
- Date of birth: 2 May 1987 (age 39)
- Place of birth: Kiryat Tiv'on, Israel
- Height: 1.83 m (6 ft 0 in)
- Position: Forward

Youth career
- Maccabi Haifa

Senior career*
Years	Team	Apps	(Gls)
2005–2011	Maccabi Haifa	49	(16)
2008	→ Maccabi Herzliya (loan)	17	(3)
2008–2009	→ Bnei Yehuda (loan)	28	(1)
2009–2010	→ Maccabi Ahi Nazareth (loan)	33	(9)
2011–2014	Mallorca	90	(21)
2014–2015	Almería	35	(8)
2015–2019	Brighton & Hove Albion	97	(30)
2018–2019	→ Queens Park Rangers (loan)	27	(7)
2019–2020	Charlton Athletic	18	(0)
2020–2021	Wellington Phoenix	21	(11)
2021–2022	Western Sydney Wanderers	20	(6)
2022–2024	Hapoel Be'er Sheva	26	(6)
2024	Maccabi Haifa	10	(1)
Total		471	(119)

International career^{‡}
2003–2004	Israel U17	12	(1)
2005	Israel U18	7	(0)
2005–2006	Israel U19	22	(1)
2006–2008	Israel U21	3	(0)
2011–2019	Israel	38	(17)
- * Club domestic league appearances and goals as of 22:52, 17 May 2024 (UTC) ‡ National team caps and goals as of 17:24, 17 May 2024 (UTC)

Tomer Hemed (Hebrew: תומר חמד; born 2 May 1987) is an Israeli professional footballer who played as a forward.

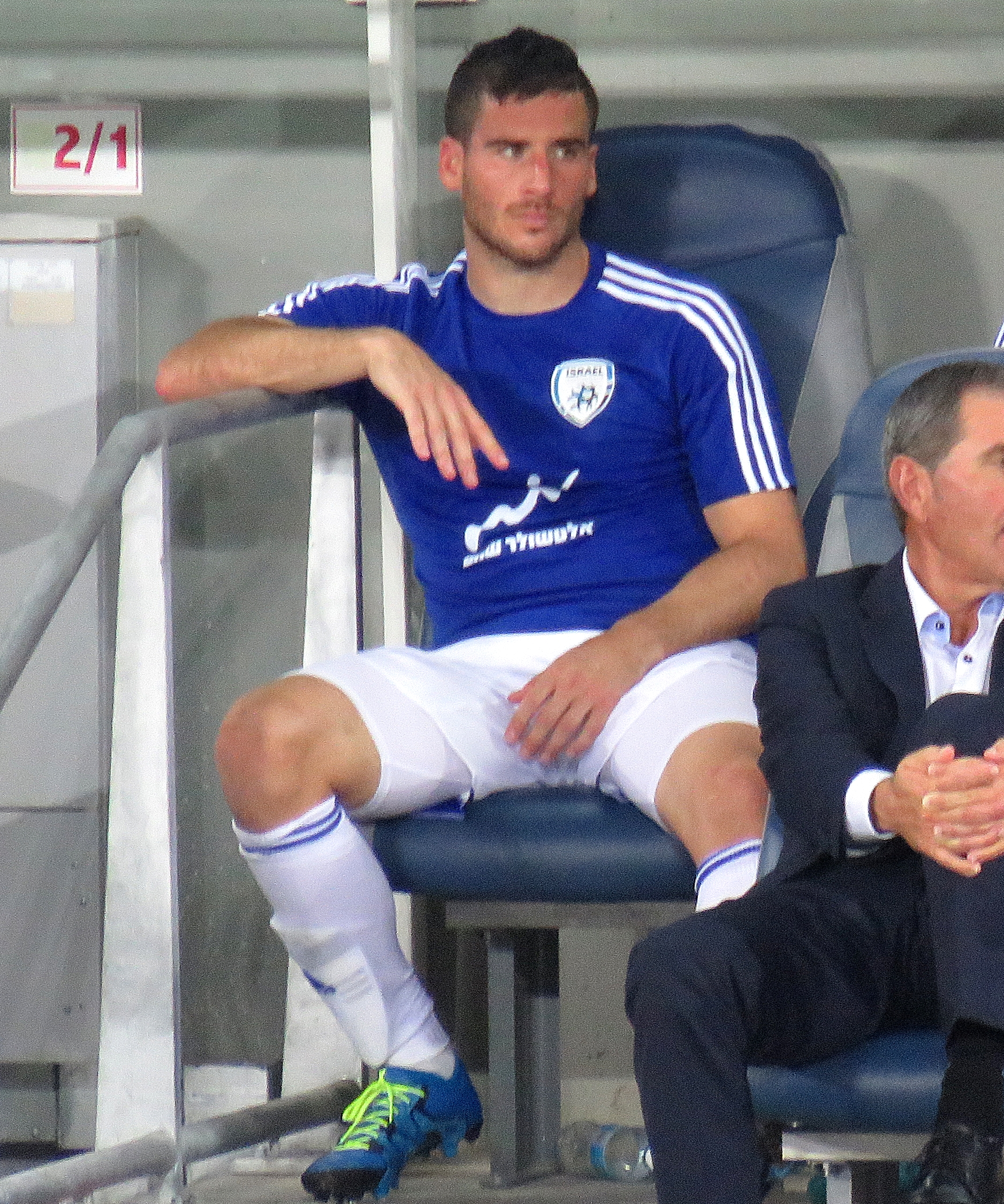
Hemed with Israel in 2015

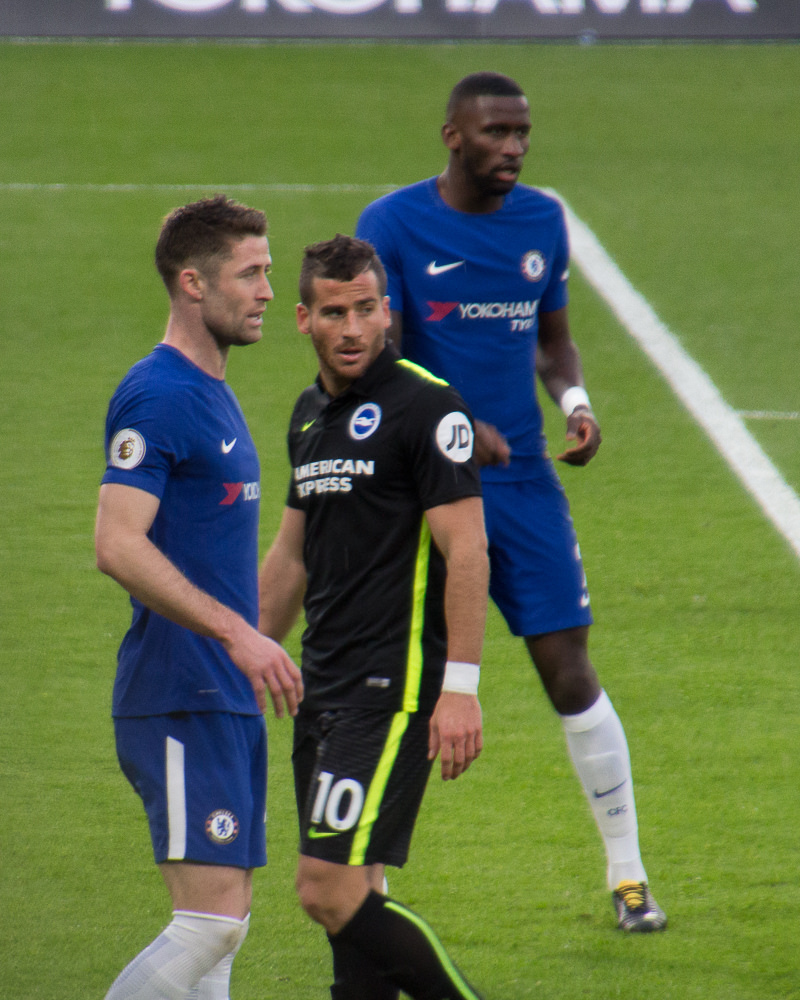
Hemed playing for Brighton against Chelsea and Gary Cahill (left) and Antonio Rüdiger (right) in 2017

== Early and personal life ==
Hemed was born and raised in Kiryat Tiv'on, Israel, to an Israeli-born father whose family is of Syrian Jewish descent, and to a Polish-born mother whose family is of Ashkenazi Jewish descent. As a result, Hemed also holds a Polish passport, which eased his move to European leagues. He is the youngest of four brothers. Hemed is observant, and in September 2018, he was a substitute for Queens Park Rangers in an evening game against Millwall, so that he could abstain from eating or exercising until the end of the 24-hour period of the Jewish high holy day of Yom Kippur. After breaking his fast, he came on late into the game.

In 2013, he married Israeli model Shunit Faragi, who was crowned second place at Miss Israel 2008, and also represented their homeland in Miss Universe 2008. They have five daughters together.

== Club career ==
=== Maccabi Haifa ===
Hemed was called up to Maccabi Haifa's first-team in early 2006, after scoring regularly for the under-18 side. He appeared three times with the main squad, scoring once, before returning to the youth side. He made his debut in the campaign on 3 March 2007, coming on as a substitute in a 1–2 home loss against Bnei Yehuda Tel Aviv. Hemed scored his first professional goals on 26 May, netting his side's both goals in a 2–0 win at Maccabi Herzliya. In 2007, he travelled with the Under-21 side to that year's Torneo di Viareggio; he scored once as Haifa was knocked-out in the group stage.

Hemed was subsequently loaned to Maccabi Herzliya, Bnei Yehuda Tel Aviv and Maccabi Ahi Nazareth (the latter being managed by John Gregory). Nazareth, however, finished last as Hemed scored nine goals.

Hemed returned to Maccabi Haifa in the 2010 summer, and appeared in 45 matches during the 2010–11 campaign, also scoring 18 goals as the club was crowned champions.

=== Mallorca ===
On 21 June 2011, Hemed signed a three-year deal with Spanish La Liga club RCD Mallorca. He made his debut in the main Spanish football league on 28 August, starting and being booked in a 1–0 home success against RCD Espanyol.

Hemed scored his first goals abroad on 1 October, scoring both his side's goals in a 2–2 draw at CA Osasuna. He also netted twice in his Copa del Rey debut, a 6–1 home routing over Real Sociedad on 10 January of the following year.

Hemed finished his first season abroad with nine goals, although four of them were from the penalty spot. In his second season he scored 11 goals, with the Balearic Islands outfit being relegated, however. In May 2013 Hemed suffered an Achilles tendon rupture, which kept him sidelined for 7 months.

=== Almería ===
On 2 July 2014 Hemed returned to the Spanish top level, by agreeing to a two-year deal with UD Almería. After struggling to score in his first matches, he netted his first goal with the Andalusians on 4 October, the last in a 2–2 home draw against Elche CF.

In January 2015, Hemed scored two braces against Málaga CF (2–1 away win) and Valencia CF (2–3 away loss), taking his tally up to 6. He finished the campaign with eight goals, being the club's top goalscorer, but suffered team relegation.

=== Brighton & Hove Albion ===
On 24 June 2015, Hemed signed a three-year deal with English Championship club Brighton & Hove Albion for an undisclosed fee. He scored his first goal for the Seagulls from the penalty spot in the last moments of an away game at Fulham, to seal a 2–1 victory. Hemed scored just one goal between September 2015 and February 2016, which drew criticism from supporters, but rediscovered his early season form to finish as the club's top scorer with 17 goals.

Tomer Hemed scored 13 goals in all competitions in Brighton's promotion-winning 2016–17 season, trading starting positions regularly with top-scorer Glenn Murray and Sam Baldock in a strike force that managed to score 44 league goals between them. Highlights from Hemed throughout the season included a last gasp equaliser in a 3–3 draw away to Brentford, the only goal in a hard earned 1–0 win against Cardiff City, and a late penalty in a narrow 1–0 away win against Burton Albion.

On 9 September 2017, Hemed scored his first Premier League goal for Brighton in a 3–1 victory over West Bromwich Albion. Hemed scored again in Brighton's next home Premier League game, a 1–0 win against Newcastle United on 24 September. Three days later, the FA announced that Hemed had been given a three-match ban for a stamp on the calf of Newcastle defender DeAndre Yedlin, an incident which went unnoticed by referee Andre Marriner.

On 16 November 2017, Hemed signed a contract extension with Brighton, keeping him on the south coast until the summer of 2019.

==== Queens Park Rangers (loan) ====
On 23 August 2018, Hemed joined Championship side Queens Park Rangers on a season-long loan. Two days later he scored his first goal for the club on his debut against Wigan Athletic in a 1–0 win at Loftus Road.

=== Charlton Athletic ===
On 19 August 2019, Hemed joined Championship side Charlton Athletic on a one-year contract after being released at Brighton. He made his debut for The Addicks as a substitute in a 1–0 home victory over fellow London side, Brentford on 24 August. Hemed was released by the South London side at the end of his contract following the clubs relegation after making 19 appearances in all competitions without finding the net.

=== Wellington Phoenix ===
On 30 November 2020, Hemed signed a one-year contract as a marquee player for A-League club Wellington Phoenix. He scored his first goal in his eighth game on 15 March 2021.

On 17 May 2021, Hemed drew media attention after he draped himself in an Israeli flag and donned a Jewish kippah during a 2–2 draw with Melbourne City FC. He received a yellow card for covering the face or head with a mask or other covering. This development coincided with the 2021 Israel-Palestine crisis. Phoenix general manager Dome claimed that Hemed was praying for peace and expressing solidarity with his country.

On 10 July 2021, Wellington Phoenix announced that Tomer Hemed had departed the club.

=== Western Sydney Wanderers ===
On 11 July 2021, Western Sydney Wanderers announced Hemed signed a one-year deal with the club.

== International career ==
Hemed appeared with the under-17, under-18, under-19 and under-21s, featuring regularly with the youth squads. In January 2011, he was called up to the senior Israel national team for a behind closed doors friendly against FC Dynamo Kyiv. Hemed made his unofficial debut on the 26th, scoring in a 3–2 win.

In May 2011, Hemed was called up to train with the national team for a friendly against Latvia in June. On 4 June, he made his international debut, starting and assisting Yossi Benayoun in a 2–1 victory.

Hemed scored his first international goal on 6 September, but in a 1–3 loss against Croatia. He also scored a hat-trick in a 6–0 routing against Luxembourg on 12 October of the following year.

== Career statistics ==
=== Club ===
As of match played 1 June 2022

Appearances and goals by club, season and competition
Club	Season	League			National cup (Note: Includes Israel State Cup, Copa del Rey, FA Cup)		League cup (Note: Includes Toto Cup, EFL Cup)		Other		Total	
Club	Season	Division	Apps	Goals	Apps	Goals	Apps	Goals	Apps	Goals	Apps	Goals
Maccabi Haifa	2005–06	Israeli Premier League	3	1	—		—		—		3	1
Maccabi Haifa	2006–07	Israeli Premier League	8	2	1	0	5	1	0	0	14	3
Maccabi Haifa	2007–08	Israeli Premier League	7	0	0	0	4	0	—		11	0
Maccabi Haifa	2010–11	Israeli Premier League	31	13	5	3	7	2	2 (Note: Appearances in UEFA Europa League)	0	45	18
Maccabi Haifa	Total		49	16	6	3	16	3	2	0	73	22
Maccabi Herzliya (loan)	2007–08	Israeli Premier League	17	3	1	0	0	0	—		18	3
Bnei Yehuda (loan)	2008–09	Israeli Premier League	28	1	2	0	7	1	—		37	2
Maccabi Ahi Nazareth (loan)	2009–10	Israeli Premier League	33	9	1	0	5	3	—		39	12
Mallorca	2011–12	La Liga	29	8	6	2	—		—		35	10
Mallorca	2012–13	La Liga	37	11	1	0	—		—		38	11
Mallorca	2013–14	Segunda División	24	2	0	0	—		—		24	2
Mallorca	Total		90	21	7	2	0	0	0	0	97	23
Almería	2014–15	La Liga	35	8	0	0	—		—		35	8
Brighton & Hove Albion	2015–16	Championship	44	17	1	0	2	0	1 (Note: Appearance in Championship play-offs)	0	48	17
Brighton & Hove Albion	2016–17	Championship	37	11	2	1	2	2	—		41	14
Brighton & Hove Albion	2017–18	Premier League	16	2	2	0	1	0	—		19	2
Brighton & Hove Albion	2018–19	Premier League	0	0	—		—		—		0	0
Brighton & Hove Albion	Total		97	30	5	1	5	2	1	0	108	33
Queens Park Rangers (loan)	2018–19	Championship	27	7	2	0	0	0	—		29	7
Charlton Athletic	2019–20	Championship	18	0	1	0	0	0	—		19	0
Wellington Phoenix	2020–21	A-League	21	11	0	0	—		—		21	11
Western Sydney Wanderers	2021–22	A-League	20	6	0	0	—		—		20	6
Hapoel Be'er Sheva	2022–23	Israeli Premier League	0	0	0	0	—		—		0	0
Career total			435	112	25	6	33	9	3	0	496	127

=== International ===
As of 5 September 2019

Appearances and goals by national team and year
National team	Year	Apps	Goals
Israel	2011	5	1
Israel	2012	7	7
Israel	2013	2	1
Israel	2014	1	1
Israel	2015	6	2
Israel	2016	5	3
Israel	2017	4	0
Israel	2018	5	2
Israel	2019	2	0
Total		37	17

As of match played 5 September 2019
Scores and results list Israel's goal tally first, score column indicates score after each Hemed goal.

List of international goals scored by Tomer Hemed
No.	Date	Venue	Cap	Opponent	Score	Result	Competition	Ref.
1	6 September 2011	Stadion Maksimir, Zagreb, Croatia	4	Croatia	1–0	1–3	UEFA Euro 2012 qualification	
2	29 February 2012	HaMoshava Stadium, Petah Tikva, Israel	6	Ukraine	1–2	2–3	Friendly	
3	15 August 2012	Ferenc Puskás Stadium, Budapest, Hungary	8	Hungary	1–1	1–1	Friendly	
4	12 October 2012	Stade Josy Barthel, Luxembourg City, Luxembourg	10	Luxembourg	3–0	6–0	2014 FIFA World Cup qualification	
5	12 October 2012	Stade Josy Barthel, Luxembourg City, Luxembourg	10	Luxembourg	5–0	6–0	2014 FIFA World Cup qualification	
6	12 October 2012	Stade Josy Barthel, Luxembourg City, Luxembourg	10	Luxembourg	6–0	6–0	2014 FIFA World Cup qualification	
7	16 October 2012	Ramat Gan Stadium, Ramat Gan, Israel	11	Luxembourg	1–0	3–0	2014 FIFA World Cup qualification	
8	16 October 2012	Ramat Gan Stadium, Ramat Gan, Israel	11	Luxembourg	3–0	3–0	2014 FIFA World Cup qualification	
9	22 March 2013	Ramat Gan Stadium, Ramat Gan, Israel	14	Portugal	1–1	3–3	2014 FIFA World Cup qualification	
10	13 October 2014	Estadi Nacional, Andorra la Vella, Andorra	15	Andorra	4–1	4–1	UEFA Euro 2016 qualification	
11	3 September 2015	Sammy Ofer Stadium, Haifa, Israel	18	Andorra	3–0	4–0	UEFA Euro 2016 qualification	
12	13 October 2015	King Baudouin Stadium, Brussels, Belgium	21	Belgium	1–3	1–3	UEFA Euro 2016 qualification	
13	6 October 2016	Philip II Arena, Skopje, Macedonia	24	Macedonia	1–0	2–1	2018 FIFA World Cup qualification	
14	9 October 2016	Teddy Stadium, Jerusalem, Israel	25	Liechtenstein	1–0	2–1	2018 FIFA World Cup qualification	
15	9 October 2016	Teddy Stadium, Jerusalem, Israel	25	Liechtenstein	2–0	2–1	2018 FIFA World Cup qualification	
16	24 March 2018	Netanya Stadium, Netanya, Israel	31	Romania	1–0	1–2	Friendly	
17	14 October 2018	Turner Stadium, Be'er Sheva, Israel	34	Albania	1–0	2–0	2018–19 UEFA Nations League C	

== Honours ==
Maccabi Haifa

- Israeli Premier League: 2010–11

Brighton & Hove Albion

- EFL Championship runner-up: 2016–17

Hapoel Be'er Sheva

- Israel Super Cup: 2022

Individual

- Israel Footballer of the Year: 2017–18

== See also ==
- List of Jewish footballers
- List of Jews in sports
- List of Israelis
