= Sanet y Negrals =

- Municipality
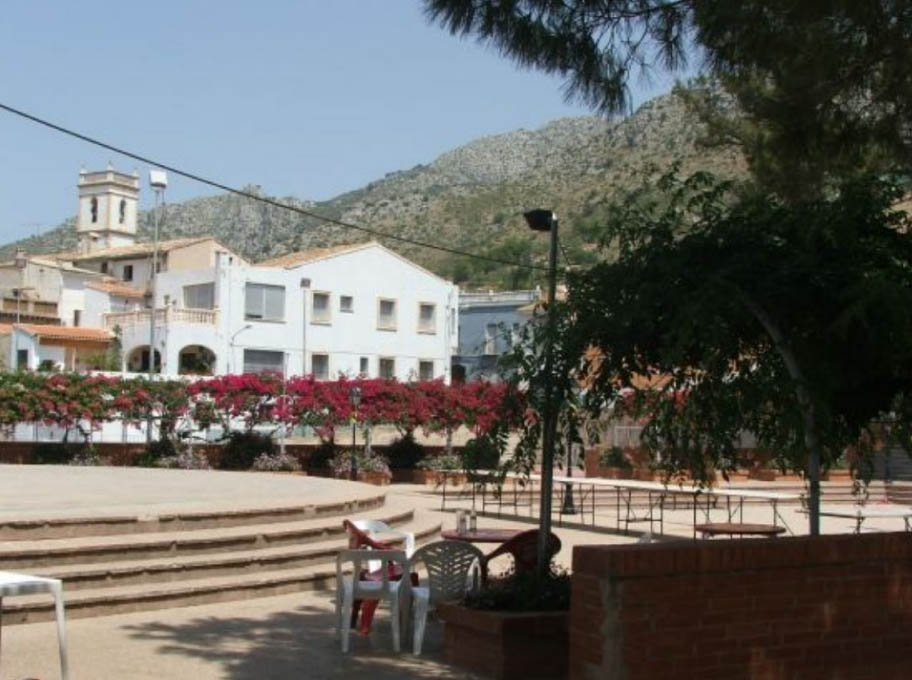

- Coat of arms

- Location in Spain
- Coordinates: 38°49′10.2″N 0°2′0.6″W
- Country: Spain
- Autonomous community: Valencian Community
- Province: Alicante
- Comarca: Marina Alta
- Judicial district: Dénia

Government
  - Mayor: Pascual Riera Vives

Area
  - Total: 21.1 km^{2} (8.1 sq mi)
- Elevation: 82 m (269 ft)

Population (2025-01-01)
  - Total: 712
  - Density: 33.7/km^{2} (87.4/sq mi)
- Demonym: Saneteros
- Time zone: UTC+1 (CET)
  - Summer (DST): UTC+2 (CEST)
- Postal code: 03769
- Official language(s): Valencian Spanish

Sanet y Negrals (Valencian: Sanet i els Negrals) is a town located in the comarca of Marina Alta, in the province of Alicante, Spain.

== Notable people ==
- Kiko Femenía, footballer
