= Kiko Femenía =

Spanish footballer (born 1991)

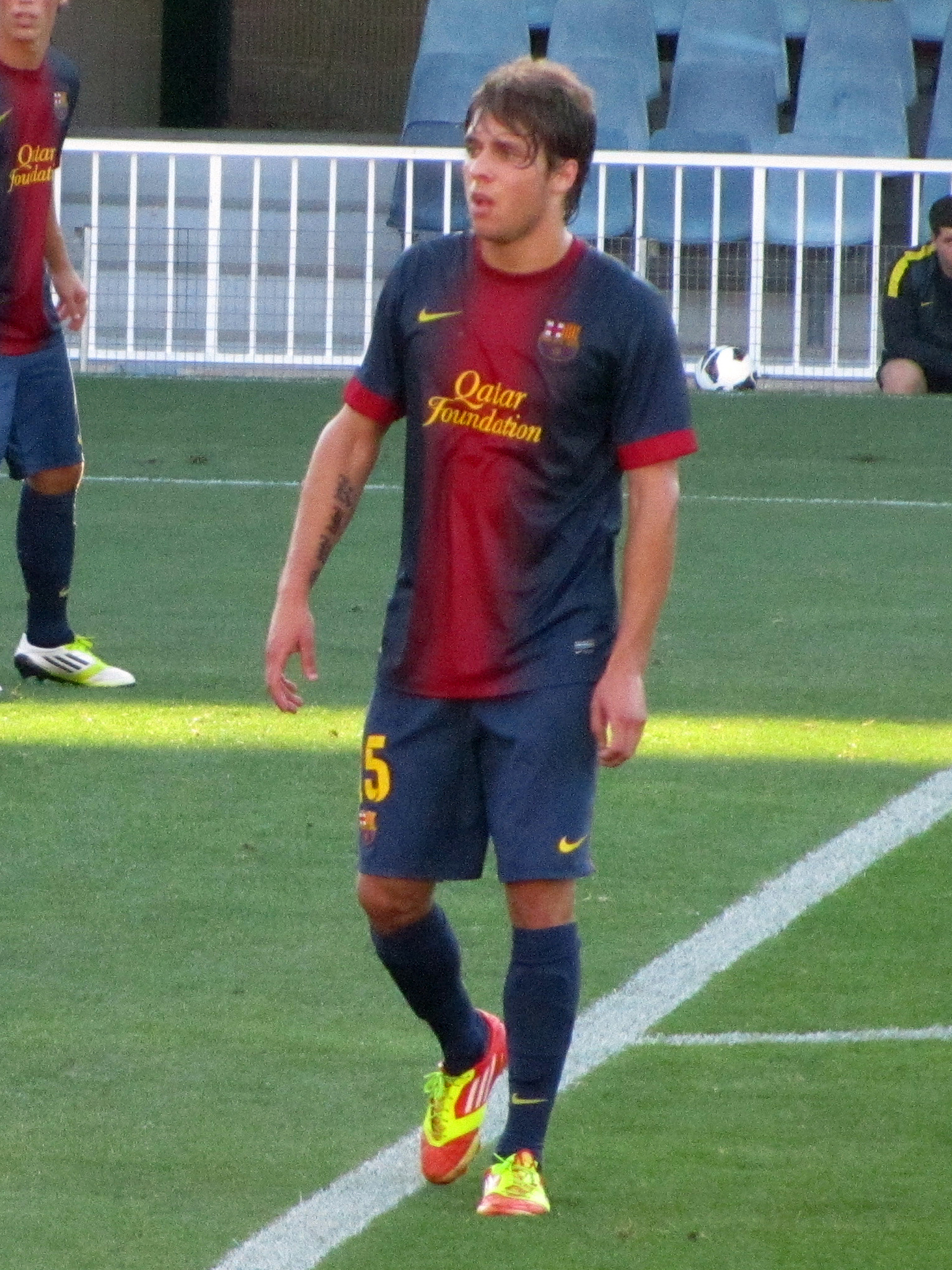
- Femenía with Barcelona B in 2012

Personal information
- Full name: Francisco Femenía Far
- Date of birth: 2 February 1991 (age 35)
- Place of birth: Sanet y Negrals, Spain
- Height: 1.74 m (5 ft 9 in)
- Position: Right-back

Team information
- Current team: Getafe
- Number: 17

Youth career
- 2000–2001: Beniarbeig
- 2001–2004: FB Dénia
- 2004–2008: Hércules

Senior career*
Years	Team	Apps	(Gls)
2008–2009	Hércules B	10	(0)
2008–2011	Hércules	71	(4)
2011–2013	Barcelona B	62	(6)
2013–2014	Real Madrid B	5	(0)
2015	Alcorcón	17	(0)
2015–2017	Alavés	69	(5)
2017–2022	Watford	144	(2)
2022–2025	Villarreal	71	(0)
2025–	Getafe	28	(1)

International career
2009	Spain U18	2	(1)
2009–2010	Spain U19	6	(0)
2011	Spain U20	3	(0)
- * Club domestic league appearances and goals as of 27 May 2026

Francisco "Kiko" Femenía Far (Spanish pronunciation: [fɾanˈθisko femeˈni.a ˈfaɾ]; born 2 February 1991) is a Spanish professional footballer who plays as a right-back for La Liga club Getafe.

== Club career ==
=== Hércules ===
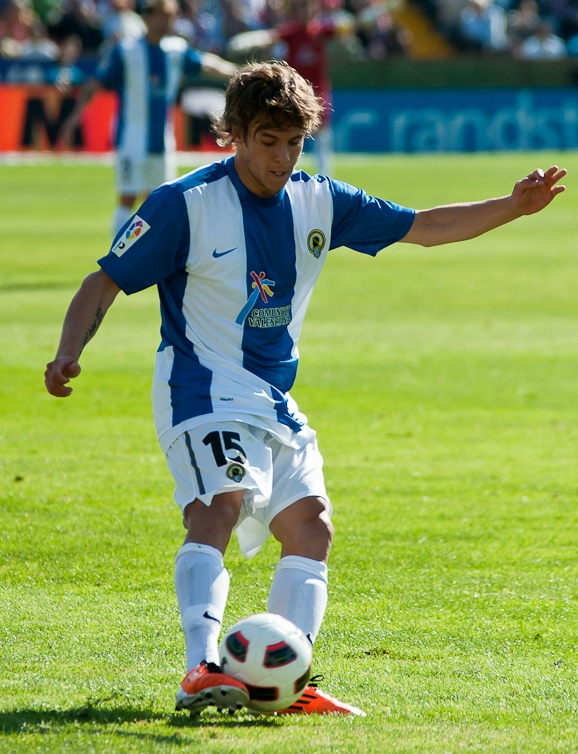
Femenía playing for Hércules in 2011

Born in Sanet y Negrals, Province of Alicante, Valencian Community, Femenía was a product of Hércules CF's youth ranks. He made his first-team debut on 15 June 2008 at just 17, appearing in a Segunda División match at Cádiz CF, a 1–1 draw which eventually certified the Andalusians' relegation even though they protested against the illegal fielding of an opposing player, specifically the youngster.

Femenía played another game with the main squad in the 2008–09 season, again in the last round but against UD Salamanca (5–1 away win). In the subsequent off-season, he signed his first professional contract after agreeing to a five-year deal and, the following campaign, still only 18, he would be a much more important midfield unit, being the first substitute for veteran Francisco Rufete and totalling nearly 1,000 minutes in the league to help the club return to La Liga after an absence of 13 years.

On 28 August 2010, Femenía made his debut in the top division, replacing Abel Aguilar in the second half of the home fixture against Athletic Bilbao. After only a few minutes on the pitch, however, and a couple of poor decisions, he suffered an anxiety attack from which he later fully recovered, although the Basques eventually won 1–0.

Femenía scored his first goal in the competition on 12 December 2010, closing the 4–1 home win over Málaga CF.

=== Barcelona ===
Femenía joined FC Barcelona Atlètic on 6 July 2011, for €2 million plus €1.5 million in add-ons. He scored his first official goal for his new team on 4 September, opening the score in a 4–0 away victory over FC Cartagena.

Femenía netted five times in 30 games – 23 starts – in his first season, helping the Catalans to the eighth position.

=== Real Madrid ===
In late August 2013, Femenía was released by Barcelona, stating that he had been "ruined emotionally". He signed for Real Madrid shortly after, being assigned to the reserve side in the second division.

Femenía appeared in only five matches during the whole campaign, which ended in relegation, and left the club in December 2014.

=== Alcorcón ===
On 7 January 2015, Femenía signed a six-month deal with AD Alcorcón also of the second tier. He totalled 996 minutes of action during the season, helping his team finish 11th.

=== Alavés ===
On 2 July 2015, Femenía moved to Deportivo Alavés after agreeing to a one-year contract. He contributed 38 appearances and five goals in his debut campaign as they returned to the top flight after ten years, and was eventually reconverted into a right-back.

Femenía left the Mendizorrotza Stadium on 6 June 2017, as his contract was due to expire.

=== Watford ===
On 1 July 2017, Femenía signed for Watford after agreeing to a four-year deal. He made his debut in the Premier League on 12 August, coming on for injured Daryl Janmaat early into a 3–3 home draw against Liverpool.

Femenía scored his first league goal for the English club on 31 March 2018, helping the hosts earn one point after a 2–2 home draw with Bournemouth.

=== Villarreal ===
On 28 July 2022, aged 31, Femenía returned to Spain after five years and joined Villarreal CF on a three-year contract, for an undisclosed fee. He played 86 games during his spell.

=== Getafe ===
On 1 July 2025, the free agent Femenía signed a two-year deal with Getafe CF also in the top tier. The following 8 March, he opened an eventual 2–0 home win over Real Betis.

== International career ==
In March 2011, Femenía was called by Spain under-21 team manager Luis Milla for a friendly against France, but never earned a cap at this level.

== Career statistics ==
As of match played 3 May 2025

Appearances and goals by club, season and competition
Club	Season	League			National cup		League cup		Europe		Total	
Club	Season	Division	Apps	Goals	Apps	Goals	Apps	Goals	Apps	Goals	Apps	Goals
Hércules B	2007–08	Regional Preferente	1	0	—		—		—		1	0
Hércules B	2008–09	Regional Preferente	9	0	—		—		—		9	0
Hércules B	Total		10	0	—		—		—		10	0
Hércules	2007–08	Segunda División	1	0	0	0	—		—		1	0
Hércules	2008–09	Segunda División	1	0	0	0	—		—		1	0
Hércules	2009–10	Segunda División	35	3	5	0	—		—		40	3
Hércules	2010–11	La Liga	34	1	1	0	—		—		35	1
Hércules	Total		71	4	6	0	—		—		77	4
Barcelona B	2011–12	Segunda División	30	5	—		—		—		30	5
Barcelona B	2012–13	Segunda División	32	1	—		—		—		32	1
Barcelona B	Total		62	6	—		—		—		62	6
Real Madrid B	2013–14	Segunda División	5	0	—		—		—		5	0
Alcorcón	2014–15	Segunda División	17	0	0	0	—		—		17	0
Alavés	2015–16	Segunda División	38	5	2	0	—		—		40	5
Alavés	2016–17	La Liga	31	0	6	0	—		—		37	0
Alavés	Total		69	5	8	0	—		—		77	5
Watford	2017–18	Premier League	23	1	0	0	0	0	—		23	1
Watford	2018–19	Premier League	29	1	3	0	2	0	—		34	1
Watford	2019–20	Premier League	28	0	0	0	1	0	—		29	0
Watford	2020–21	Championship	37	0	0	0	0	0	—		37	0
Watford	2021–22	Premier League	27	0	0	0	1	0	—		28	0
Watford	Total		144	2	3	0	4	0	0	0	151	2
Villarreal	2022–23	La Liga	20	0	2	0	—		6 (Note: Appearances in UEFA Europa Conference League)	0	28	0
Villarreal	2023–24	La Liga	23	0	3	0	—		4 (Note: Appearances in UEFA Europa League)	0	30	0
Villarreal	2024–25	La Liga	28	0	0	0	—		—		28	0
Villarreal	Total		71	0	5	0	—		10	0	86	0
Career total			449	17	22	0	4	0	10	0	485	17

== Honours ==
Alavés

- Segunda División: 2015–16

Watford

- FA Cup runner-up: 2018–19
