= Arafo =

- Municipality
- Flag Coat of arms

- Municipal location in Tenerife

- Location in Tenerife Arafo (Canary Islands) Arafo (Spain, Canary Islands)
- Coordinates: 28°20′24″N 16°25′10″W
- Country: Spain
- Autonomous community: Canary Islands
- Province: Santa Cruz de Tenerife
- Island: Tenerife

Area
  - Total: 33.92 km^{2} (13.10 sq mi)
- Elevation: 470 m (1,540 ft)

Population (2025-01-01)
  - Total: 5,945
  - Density: 175.3/km^{2} (453.9/sq mi)
- Climate: Csb

Arafo is a municipality of the southeastern part of the island of Tenerife in the province of Santa Cruz de Tenerife, on the Canary Islands. The town Arafo is situated 5 km west of the coast town Candelaria and 22 km southwest of Santa Cruz de Tenerife. The TF-1 motorway passes through the eastern part of the municipality.

== Historical population ==
Year	Population
1991	4,200
1996	4,667
2001	4,995
2002	5,156
2003	5,122
2004	5,256
2005	5,276
2009	5,502

== See also ==
- List of municipalities in Santa Cruz de Tenerife
