= Raúl García (footballer, born 1989) =

Spanish footballer

Personal information
- Full name: Raúl García Carnero
- Date of birth: 30 April 1989 (age 37)
- Place of birth: A Coruña, Spain
- Height: 1.80 m (5 ft 11 in)
- Position: Left-back

Youth career
- 1997–2001: Victoria
- 2001–2008: Deportivo La Coruña

Senior career*
| Years | Team | Apps | (Gls) |
| 2008–2012 | Deportivo B | 58 | (1) |
| 2008–2009 | → Montañeros (loan) | 44 | (1) |
| 2010–2012 | Deportivo La Coruña | 5 | (0) |
| 2011–2012 | → Melilla (loan) | 28 | (0) |
| 2012–2013 | Almería B | 20 | (1) |
| 2012–2014 | Almería | 13 | (1) |
| 2014 | → Alavés (loan) | 16 | (0) |
| 2014–2017 | Alavés | 96 | (7) |
| 2017–2019 | Leganés | 24 | (0) |
| 2019 | Girona | 10 | (0) |
| 2019–2020 | Getafe | 4 | (0) |
| 2020 | → Valladolid (loan) | 12 | (0) |
| 2020–2023 | Valladolid | 14 | (1) |
| 2022–2023 | → Deportivo La Coruña (loan) | 23 | (1) |
| Total | | 367 | (13) |
- * Club domestic league appearances and goals

Raúl García Carnero (born 30 April 1989) is a Spanish former professional footballer who played as a left-back.

== Club career ==
Born in A Coruña, García began playing football with local Victoria CF, signing for neighbouring Deportivo de La Coruña at the age of 12. He spent the vast majority of his first years as a senior with the Galicians's B team, also being loaned to Tercera División club Montañeros CF for the second part of 2007–08 and the entire following season.

On 4 April 2010, García made his first-team – and La Liga – debut, in a 3–0 away defeat against Atlético Madrid. He played a further four league games with the main squad until the end of the campaign.

In the following season, García returned to Deportivo B and was loaned to fellow Segunda División B side UD Melilla in the summer of 2011. Subsequently, he was offered a new deal by his parent club, on the condition he accepted another loan; the player refused and signed with UD Almería on 5 July 2012, initially being assigned to the reserves.

García was called up to the first team on 26 October 2012, due to injuries. He made his competitive debut the day after, starting in a 1–0 Segunda División home win over SD Huesca. He scored his first goal as a professional in the next match, opening a 2–0 victory at Recreativo de Huelva.

On 28 June 2013, after contributing eight appearances as Almería returned to the top flight after two years out, García was promoted to the first team due to a clause on his contract. However, he was loaned to Deportivo Alavés in January 2014.

García terminated his contract at the Estadio de los Juegos Mediterráneos on 14 July 2014, and joined Alavés on a permanent basis hours later. He scored a career-best five goals in 2015–16, achieving promotion to the main division as champions.

On 5 June 2017, García signed a two-year deal with fellow top-tier club CD Leganés. In January 2019, having been sparingly played during the first part of the season, the free agent joined Girona FC – of the same league – for five months.

On 1 July 2019, after suffering relegation, García moved to Getafe CF on a three-year deal, but agreed to a six-month loan at Real Valladolid in the following transfer window. On 28 July 2020, he signed a permanent three-year contract with the latter. He scored his only goal in the top flight on 19 December, in a 1–1 draw away to Sevilla FC.

García returned to his first club Deportivo in July 2022, agreeing to a one-year loan. On 7 July 2023, he terminated his contract with Valladolid.

== Honours ==
Alavés

- Segunda División: 2015–16
