= List of deaths from anorexia nervosa =

This is a list of notable people who have died from anorexia nervosa, in chronological order.

- 1380: Catherine of Siena – Italian Saint, aged 33
- 1387: Pierre de Luxembourg – French Catholic bishop, aged 17
- 1882: Sophie Gray – Scottish model, aged 38
- 1909: Renée Vivien – British poet who wrote in the French language, aged 32
- 1936: Irene Fenwick – American stage and silent film actress, aged 49
- 1952: Susan Peters – American actress, aged 31
- 1957: Caren "Sande" Crabbe – Daughter of Buster Crabbe, aged 20
- 1982: Helga Braathen – Norwegian gymnast, aged 29
- 1983: Karen Carpenter – American singer, drummer (The Carpenters), aged 32
- 1994: Christy Henrich – American gymnast, aged 22
- 1996: Cynthia MacGregor – American tennis player, aged 31
- 1997: Heidi Guenther – American ballerina, aged 22
- 1997: Michael Krasnow – American author, My Life as a Male Anorexic, aged 28
- 1999: Lena Zavaroni – Scottish singer and actress, aged 35
- 2001: Bahne Rabe – German rower, aged 37
- 2003: Helen Moros – New Zealand long-distance runner, aged 35
- 2003: Debbie Barham – English comedy writer, aged 26
- 2006: Luisel Ramos – Uruguayan model, aged 22
- 2006: Ana Carolina Reston – Brazilian model, aged 21
- 2007: Eliana Ramos – Uruguayan model, younger sister of Luisel Ramos, aged 18
- 2007: Hila Elmalich – Israeli model, aged 33
- 2010: Isabelle Caro – French model, anorexia activist, and actress, aged 28
- 2016: Morgan Claire Dunn – Mental health advocate, and inspiration for changes in the eating disorder community
- 2018: Javiera Muñoz – Swedish singer, aged 40
- 2019: Lene Marie Fossen – Norwegian photographer and artist, aged 33
- 2020: Josi Maria – German influencer, aged 24
- 2021: Nikki Grahame – English television personality, aged 38
- 2025: Stina Oscarson – Swedish theatre director, author and debater, aged 49
- 2025: Gülnihal Candan – Turkish legal practitioner, social media and TV personality, aged 30

== See also ==
- History of anorexia nervosa
- List of people who died of starvation
- Lists of people by cause of death
