= Eliana Ramos =

Uruguayan model

- Born: December 23, 1988; Uruguay
- Died: February 13, 2007 (aged 18); Montevideo, Uruguay
- Cause of death: Heart attack caused by anorexia nervosa
- Occupation: Model
- Relatives: Luisel Ramos (sister); Luis Ramos (father)
- Modeling information
- Hair color: Blonde
- Eye color: Blue/Green
- Agency: Dotto Models

Eliana "Elle" Ramos (December 23, 1988 – February 13, 2007) was a Uruguayan fashion model.

== Modeling ==
Ramos was a fashion model in Latin America and was signed to Dotto Models, a prestigious modeling agency based in Argentina. Outside of South America, Eliana also worked in Mexico and stayed in Japan for three months in early 2006 with her sister Luisel.

== Death ==
On February 13, 2007, Eliana Ramos was found dead at her grandparents' home in Montevideo, Uruguay, at age 18. Preliminary examinations indicated the cause of death as heart attack, believed to be related to malnutrition; final test results were released at a later date.

Fellow models confirmed that she had suffered for many months after her sister Luisel Ramos, 22, died of heart failure, but rejected speculations that an eating disorder could have played a role. Her sister died shortly after stepping off a runway in August 2006 during a fashion show at a Montevideo hotel. An autopsy cited the cause of death as a heart attack.

The deaths drew widespread media attention in Latin America, where the fashion industry's treatment of young women has been the subject of debate since anorexia was blamed for the deaths of model Ana Carolina Reston and three other Brazilian women in December.

The sisters' father, Luis Ramos, was a former football player for the Uruguay national team, and was reportedly vacationing with his wife elsewhere in the country at the time of Eliana's death.

== See also ==
- List of deaths from anorexia nervosa
