= No.l.ita =

Italian fashion designer

No.l.ita is an Italian fashion designer. In 2007, the company generated a storm of controversy for their "No.Anorexia" ad campaign featuring emaciated model Isabelle Caro.
