= Cementerio del Buceo, Montevideo =

Cemetery in Uruguay

Cementerio del Buceo
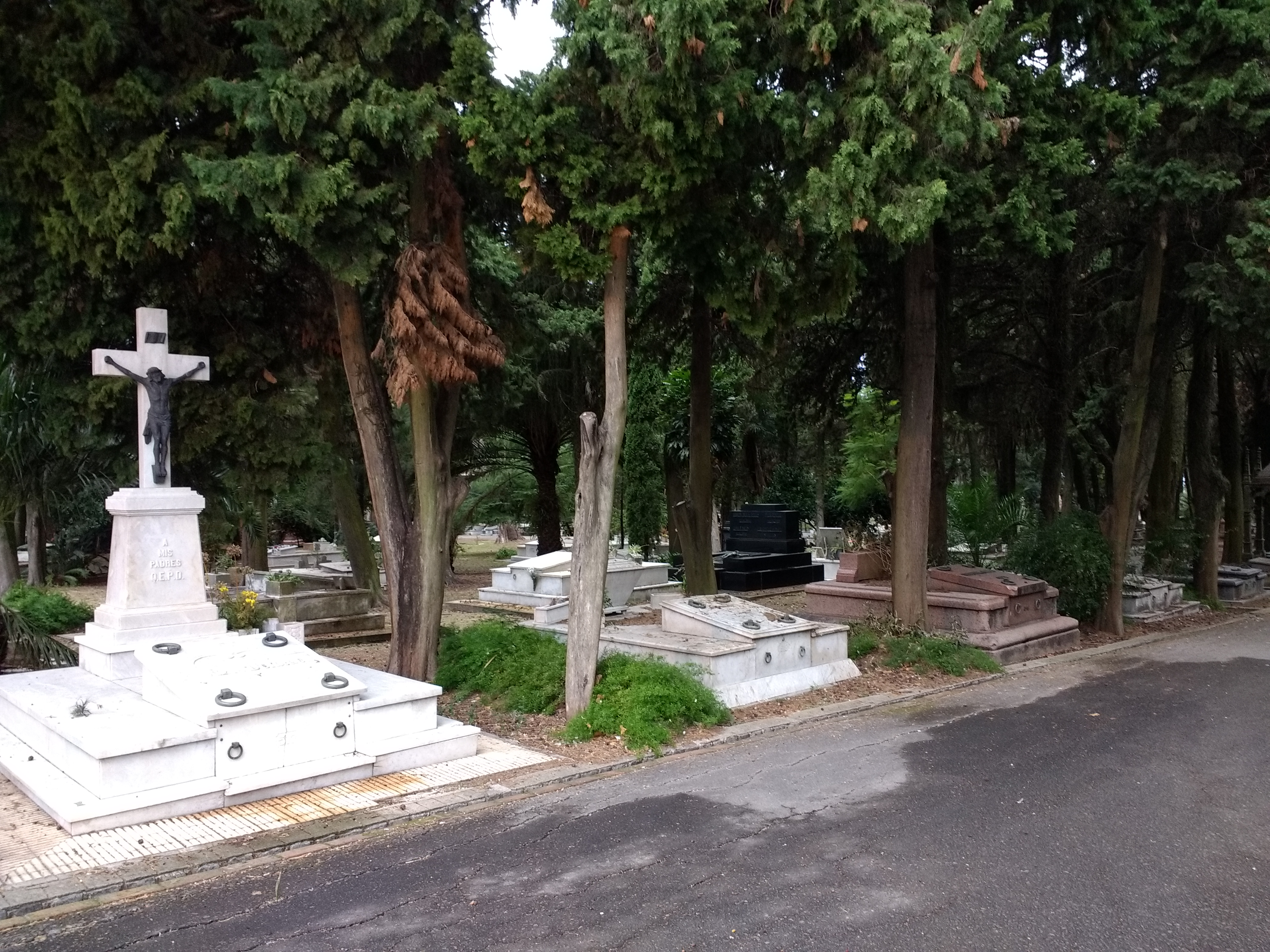

Details
- Established: 1872
- Location: Av. Gral. Rivera 3934; Montevideo
- Country: Uruguay
- Coordinates: 34.901°S 56.126°W
- Type: municipal
- Owned by: Intendencia de Montevideo

Cementerio del Buceo is a cemetery in Montevideo, Uruguay. It was established in 1872.

It is located in the barrio of Buceo, near the shores of the Río de la Plata. Nearby is the British Cemetery.

== Notable burials ==
- Rafael Barradas (1890–1929), painter
- Pedro Cubilla (1933–2007), professional football player and coach
- Juan José de Amézaga (1881–1956), President of Uruguay
- Esteban Echeverría (1805–1851), writer, poet and political figure
- Julio Frade (1943–2025), musician, actor, radio host, and comedian
- Luisel Ramos (1984–2006), model
- Juan Pablo Rebella (1974–2006), filmmaker
- Juan Alberto Schiaffino (1925–2002), footballer
