= Giorgio Armani =

Italian fashion designer (1934–2025)

Giorgio Armani OMRI
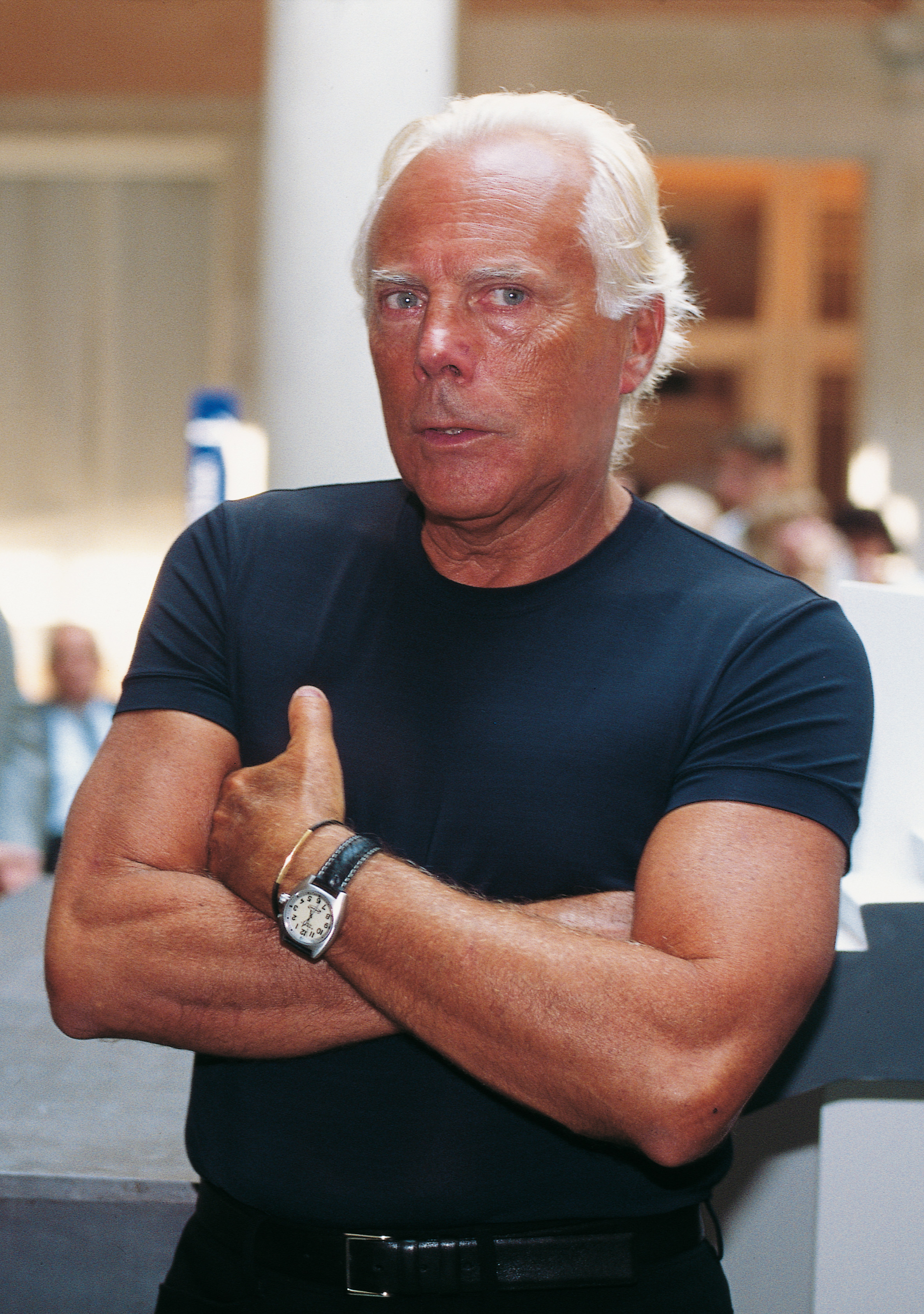
- Armani in 1997
- Born: 11 July 1934; Piacenza, Italy
- Died: 4 September 2025 (aged 91); Milan, Italy
- Education: University of Milan
- Occupation: Fashion designer
- Known for: Founding Armani

Giorgio Armani (Italian: [ˈdʒordʒo arˈmaːni]; 11 July 1934 – 4 September 2025) was an Italian fashion designer and founder of the Armani luxury fashion house. Widely regarded as among the most influential designers in contemporary fashion, Armani initially gained recognition for his work with fashion house Cerruti 1881, before founding his own label in 1975. He became known for minimalist, deconstructed silhouettes—especially his jackets and suits—which are said to have redefined masculine and feminine elegance in a contemporary form. Armani also played a pivotal role in shaping celebrity style, particularly red-carpet fashion. By the early 2000s, he was recognized as the most successful Italian designer, with his brand expanding into music, sport, and luxury hotels.

Born in Piacenza, Armani grew up during World War II in modest circumstances and initially pursued medical studies at the University of Milan before leaving to serve in the Italian Army. After his military service, Armani began his career in fashion as a window dresser and sales clerk at La Rinascente in Milan, later designing menswear for Nino Cerruti while freelancing for multiple manufacturers. In 1973, he partnered with Sergio Galeotti to open a design office and in 1975 they founded Giorgio Armani S.p.A., launching men's and women's ready-to-wear collections. Armani expanded his brand globally, introducing several lines including Emporio Armani, Armani Junior and AX Armani Exchange, while also establishing a presence in cosmetics, perfumes and home furnishings. His work in costume design for over 100 films, notably American Gigolo (1980), helped cement his international reputation.

Beyond fashion, Armani ventured into hotels, sports and music, including the Armani Hotel in Dubai, designing uniforms for Olympic and professional sports teams and curating Emporio Armani Caffè music compilations. He was an advocate for ethical practices, including banning underweight models in 2007 and promoting sustainable fashion initiatives. Armani maintained a private personal life, including a long-term partnership with Galeotti until the latter's death in 1985.

== Early life ==
Giorgio Armani was born on 11 July 1934 in Piacenza to Ugo Armani, an accountant for a transport company, and Maria Raimondi. He grew up with his older brother Sergio and younger sister Rosanna. Living in poverty during World War II, he was severely burned when an unexploded artillery shell he had been playing with detonated, which also killed one of his close friends.

While at secondary school at the Liceo Scientifico Leonardo da Vinci in Milan, Giorgio Armani aspired to have a career in the army, particularly after reading A. J. Cronin's The Citadel. He enrolled in the department of medicine at the University of Milan. In 1953, after attending for three years, he left and joined the army. Due to his medical educational background, he was assigned to the Military Hospital in Verona, where he attended shows at the Arena. He eventually decided to look for a different career path.

== Design career ==
=== 1957–1974: early career ===
In 1957, after serving in the military for two years, Armani became a window dresser and sales clerk at La Rinascente, a department store in Milan. Also in 1957, at the store, he was responsible for showcasing the earliest garments of the innovative Finnish textiles, clothing, and home furnishings company, Marimekko. He became a seller for the menswear department. In that capacity, he gained valuable experience in the marketing aspect of the fashion industry. In the mid-1960s, Armani moved to the Nino Cerruti company, where he designed menswear. His skills were in demand, and for the next decade, while working for Cerruti, Armani also freelanced, contributing designs to as many as ten manufacturers at a time.

In the late 1960s, Armani met Sergio Galeotti, an architectural draftsman, marking the beginning of a personal and professional relationship that lasted for many years. In 1973, Galeotti persuaded him to open a design office in Milan, at 37 Corso Venezia. This led to a period of extensive collaboration, during which Armani worked as a freelance designer for several fashion houses, including Allegri, Bagutta, Hilton, Sicons, Gibò, Montedoro, and Tendresse. The international press was quick to acknowledge Armani's importance following the runway shows at the Sala Bianca in the Pitti Palace in Florence. The experience allowed Armani to develop his style in new ways.

=== 1975–1983: founding Armani ===
Armani felt that he was ready to devote his energy to his own label; on 24 July 1975, he and Galeotti founded Giorgio Armani S.p.A. in Milan. In October 1975, he presented his first collection of men's ready-to-wear for Spring and Summer of 1976 under his own name. He produced a women's line for the same season. In 1990, Armani supported the MoMA exhibition Pier Paolo Pasolini: The Eyes of a Poet, which showcased a retrospective of Pasolini's cinematic work. Armani's contribution included the donation of a copy of the Pasolini film Accattone (1961), reflecting his engagement with cultural initiatives beyond fashion.

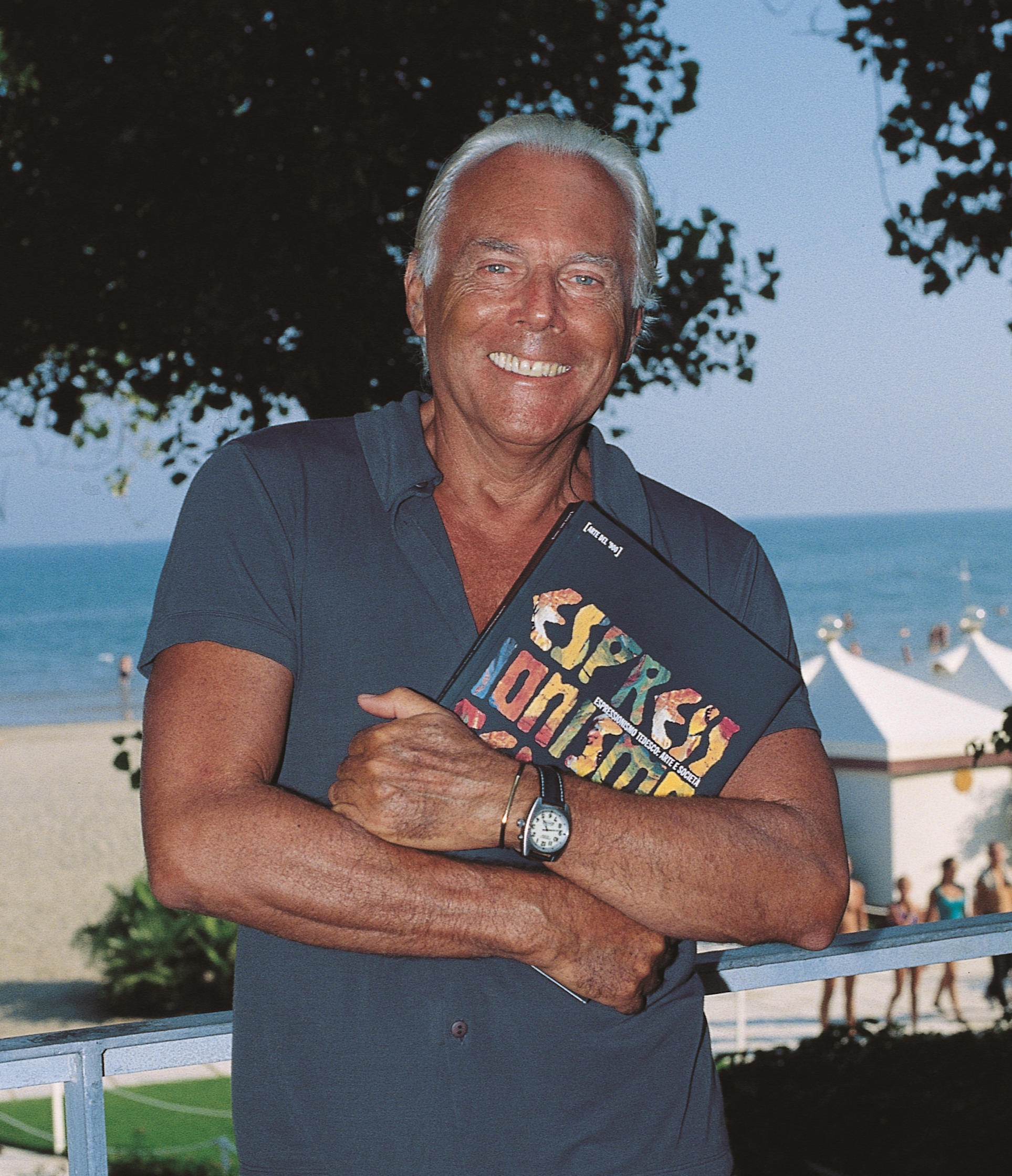
Armani in 1997

Armani established an innovative relationship with the fashion industry, characterized by the 1978 agreement with Gruppo Finanzario Tessile (GFT), which made it possible to produce luxury ready-to-wear in a manufacturing environment under the attentive supervision of the company's designer. In 1979, after founding the Giorgio Armani Corporation, Armani began producing for the United States and introduced the Main line for men and women. The label became one of the leading names in international fashion with the introduction of several new product lines, including G. A. Le Collezioni, Giorgio Armani Underwear and Swimwear, and Giorgio Armani Accessories.

In the early 1980s, the company signed an important agreement with L'Oréal to create perfumes and cosmetics Armani Beauty and introduced the Armani Junior, Armani Jeans, and Emporio Armani lines, followed in 1982 by the introduction of Emporio Underwear, Swimwear, and Accessories. A new store was opened in Milan for the Emporio line, followed by the first Giorgio Armani boutique. However, Armani was concerned for the end user, which later culminated in the development of a more youthful product with the same level of stylistic quality as his high-end line, but at a more accessible price. Armani felt that he had to make use of new and unconventional advertising methods.

Armani felt that a relationship with the film industry was essential, both for promotional reasons and for creative stimulus. In 1980, he was involved in the costume-making of the film American Gigolo, specifically for actor Richard Gere who played the main character Julian Kaye. The production of his work through film helped to publicize Armani's name, with a scene involving Gere yanking open a drawer of Armani shirts, perfectly folded with the labels exposed, before creating four entirely Armani outfits in the film. This connection to the film industry projected his name and brand to a much broader audience. Armani designed costumes for more than one hundred films, one of the most important of which was The Untouchables (1987).

In 1983, the designer modified his agreement with GFT. They began to produce both the Mani line for the United States and his high-end ready-to-wear line, rechristened Borgonuovo 21, after the address of the company headquarters. During the late 1980s, despite Galeotti's death in 1985, Armani continued to expand commercial horizons and licensing agreements. He opened Armani Japan and introduced a line of eyeglasses, socks, a gift collection and a new "basic" men's and women's line for America known as A/X Armani Exchange in the late 1980s and early 1990s. In 2000, Armani saw an increase of investment activity towards his brand, including stock sales and the acquisition of new manufacturing capacity intended to increase Armani's control over the quality and distribution of his products.

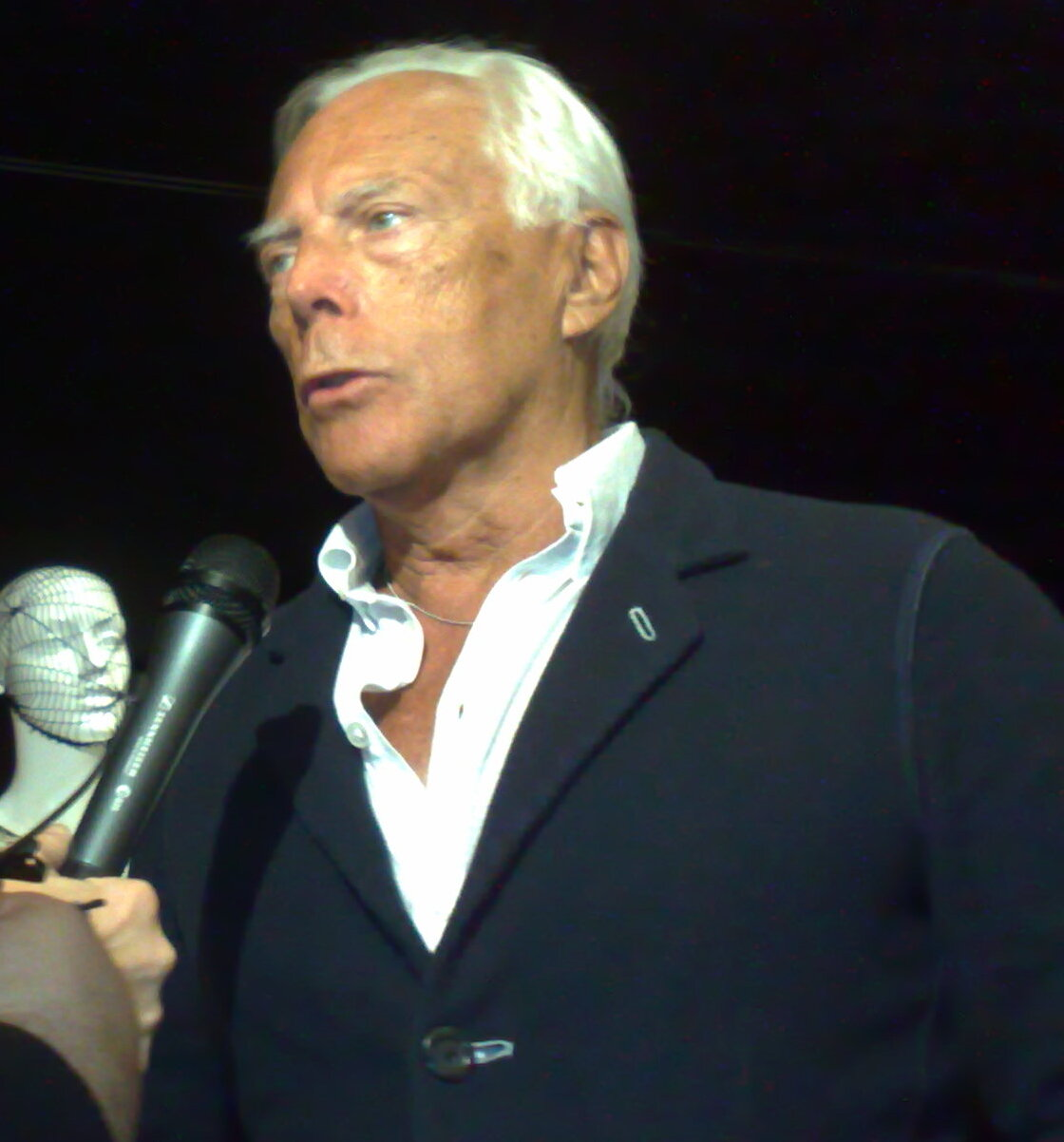
Armani in 2008

In 1991, Armani introduced AX Armani Exchange, a line focused on casual, everyday clothing such as T-shirts, designed for younger consumers and the American mass market. In 1996, his long-time friend, the singer Eric Clapton composed songs for Armani's fashion shows and has since dressed in Armani. Later that year, Clapton opened two Emporio Armani stores in New York City. In 1998, Armani hosted a party for Clapton's Crossroads guitar auction.

The Oxford Art Journal made note in their article, "Hermes in Asia: Haute Couture, High Art and the Marketplace", that Armani took influences from other cultures as inspiration for some of his works and cited his Japanese designs as examples. Armani also prepared to break into the Chinese market by opening up his first store in that country in 1998. A small shop in Beijing was followed by a flagship store in Shanghai in 2004 and plans for 40 by 2011. In 2000, Armani SpA was introducing new lines of cosmetics and home furnishings and expanding its line of accessories.

=== 2008–2025: later career ===
In 2007, Armani became the first designer to ban models with a body mass index (BMI) under 18, after model Ana Carolina Reston starved herself to death due to anorexia nervosa. He broadcast his collection live on the Internet, the first in the world of haute couture, on 24 January 2007. The Armani Privé Spring/Summer 2007 fashion show was broadcast via MSN and Cingular cellular phones. In 2008, Armani designed a bullfighting costume entitled the "Goyesco" that was worn by Spanish bullfighter Cayetano Rivera Ordóñez at the "Corrida Goyesca" in Ronda, Spain. They also collaborated on several fashion shows and other events. Starting in 2009, Armani had a retail network of 60 Giorgio Armani boutiques, 11 Collezioni, 122 Emporio Armani, 94 A/X Armani Exchange, 1 Giorgio Armani Accessori and 13 Armani Junior stores spread over 37 countries.

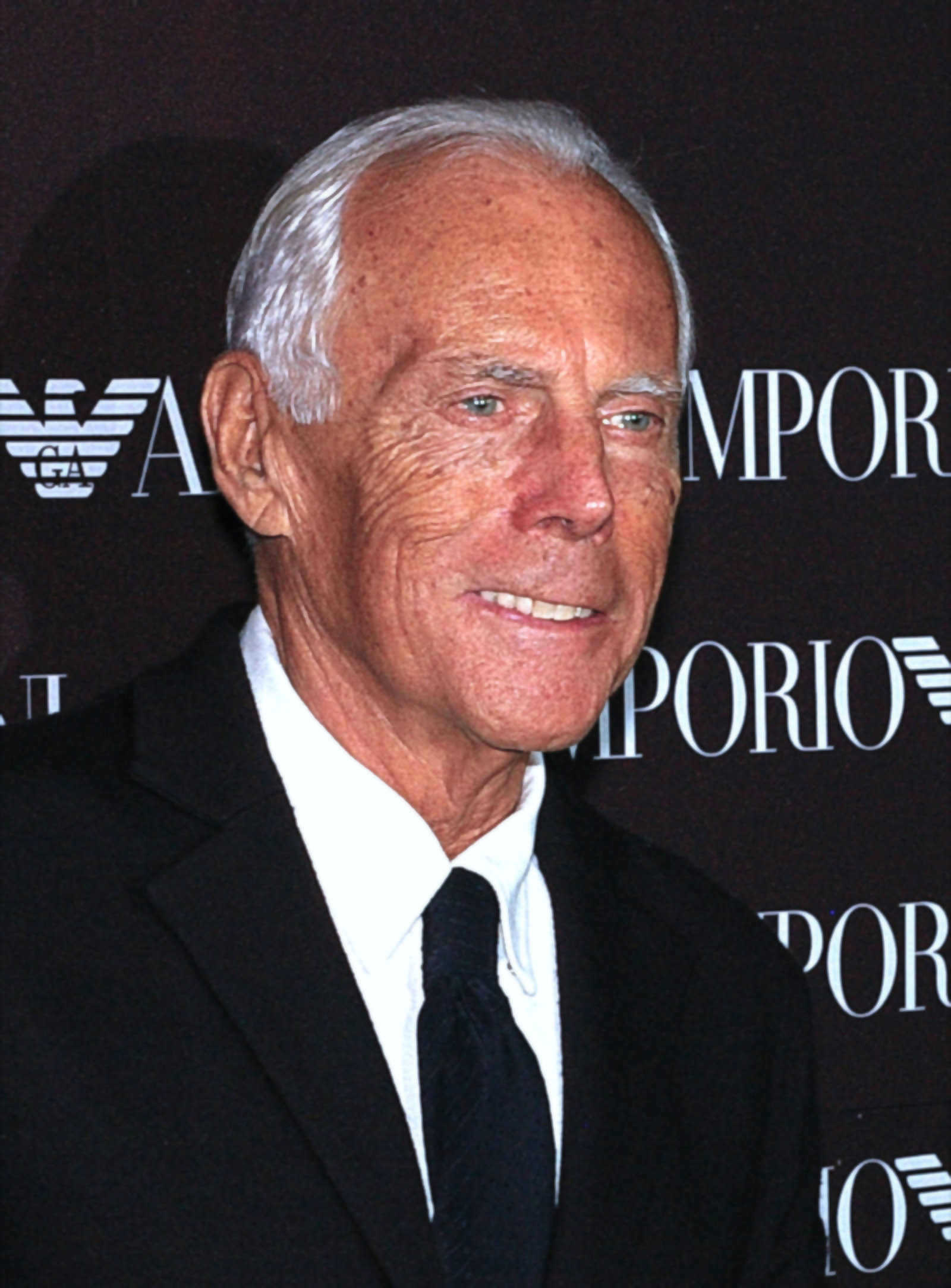
Armani in 2009

In 2011, Armani became the first luxury designer to accept Livia Giuggioli Firth's Green Carpet Challenge to highlight sustainable fashion created out of recycled plastics and fabrics. His designs for the challenge were a dress for her and a tuxedo for her then-husband, actor Colin Firth. In 2015, Armani was an artist who was a part of the Paris Photography Public Programme. This event helped showcase a variety of special exhibitions. As an official partner, Armani's ACQUA #6, represented works that focus on the theme of water in photography. As of 2017, he had an annual turnover of $1.6 billion and a personal fortune of $8.1 billion.

In 2019, he introduced his first fine jewellery collection during Haute Couture Week in Paris. The 2022 "Josephine" collection, inspired by Joséphine de Beauharnais, incorporated paisley motifs with chalcedony and grey diamonds. His fine jewelry has since been worn by celebrities, including Sophia Loren, Brie Larson, and Brooke Shields, at high-profile events. Armani designed many stage outfits for pop superstar Lady Gaga, including those worn on her record-breaking Monster Ball Tour and Born This Way Ball Tour. He also designed for many high-profile award shows, such as the 52nd Grammy Awards and the 2010 MTV Video Music Awards.

== Other activities ==
=== Armani Hotel Collection ===
In 2005, Giorgio Armani S.p.A. signed a long-term licensing agreement with Emaar Properties PJSC for the development of a global collection of luxury hotels and resorts under the Armani name. Emaar would oversee construction, management, and operations, while Armani retained creative control over interior design, furnishings, and overall style. The Armani Hotel was opened in Burj Khalifa on 27 April 2010, comprising the bottom 39 floors of the supertall skyscraper in Dubai, United Arab Emirates; it has 160 guest rooms and suites, and 144 residences. Armani also designed the interiors of the Armani Residences, also within the skyscraper, and its specially designed line of products from the Armani/Casa home furnishings collection.

=== Music ===
Armani Musica presents Emporio Armani Caffè compilations, a series of special CD compilations curated by Armani with DJ-sound designer Matteo Ceccarini, offering a mix of conceptual sounds and underground rhythms.

=== Sport ===
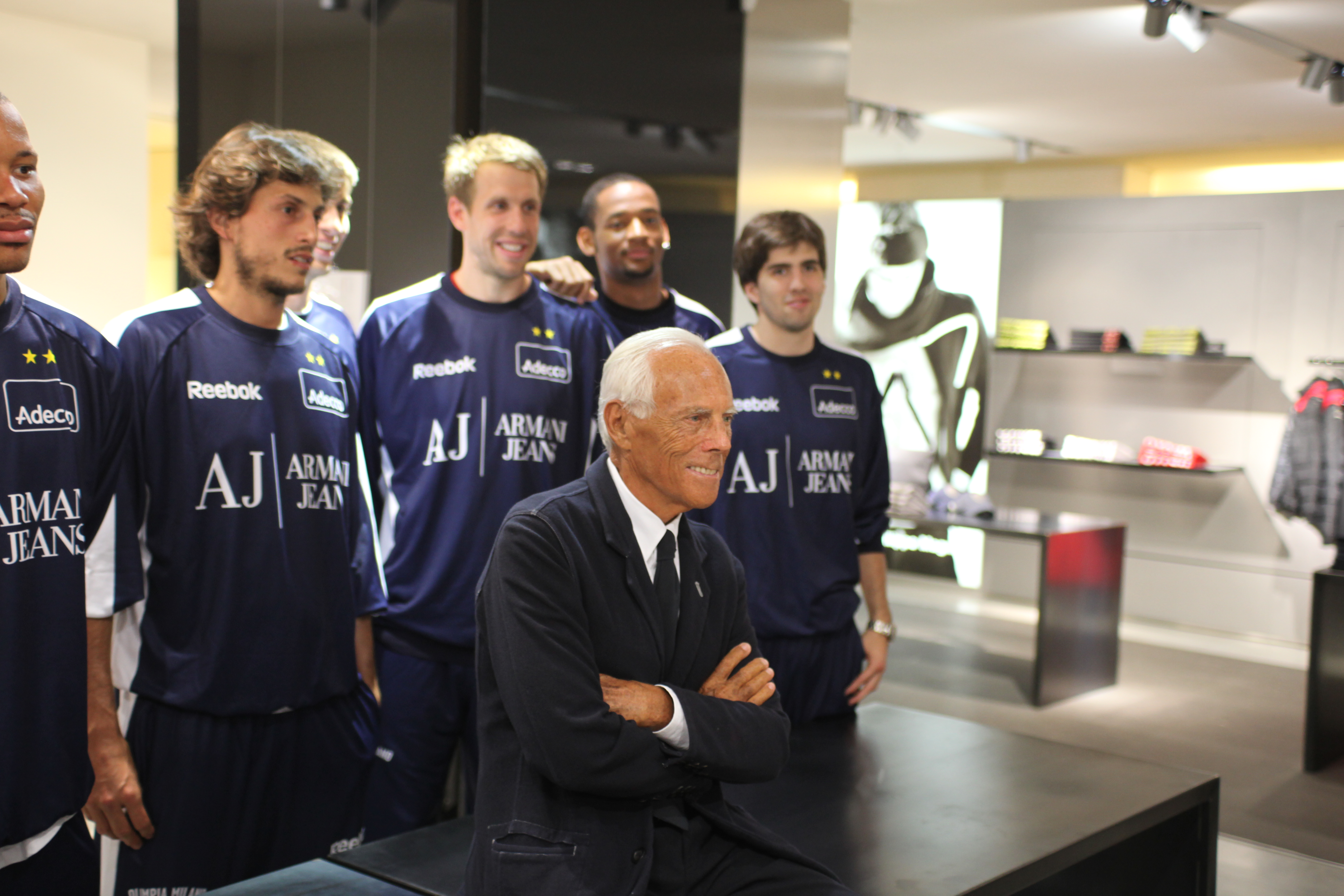
Armani with Olimpia Milano basketball players at Vogue Fashion's Night Out, September 2009

Armani had a keen interest in sports. He was a supporter and president of the Olimpia Milano basketball team, which won six Serie A, four Coppa Italia, and four Supercoppa Italiana titles, plus the 2021 EuroLeague Final Four. In association football, he was an Inter Milan fan, although he also expressed support for AC Milan and said that Olimpia Milano was his favourite due to uniting the city of Milan.

Armani designed suits for the England national football team twice. Subsequently, he designed suits worn by players of the London club Chelsea since August 2007. He designed the Italian flag bearers' outfits at the opening ceremony at the 2006 Winter Olympics in Turin, and also designed Italy's Olympic uniforms for the 2012 Summer Olympics in London. Armani also designed and introduced the EA7 range, a brand inspired by Ukrainian footballer Andriy Shevchenko, who at the time played for AC Milan and wore the number 7 jersey. As regards sports, Armani owned Olimpia Milano and designed uniforms for the Italian Olympic and Paralympic teams and for Piacenza Calcio 1919, the football club of his birthplace town;

Chelsea commissioned Armani to create a new look for its Directors' Suite at Stamford Bridge. Beginning in 2021, Armani entered into a multi-year sponsorship agreement as an official supplier to Scuderia Ferrari. Armani provided official and travel ensembles to members of the team in return for brand exposure and association with the world's number-one brand and most popular motorsport team. His last sport partnership design was with Juventus.

== Personal life ==
=== Family ===
Armani had no children. His immediate family included his late elder brother Sergio, his younger sister Rosanna, and three younger relatives: nieces Silvana and Roberta Armani, and nephew Andrea Camerana. He credited Rosanna—once a fashion model and long regarded as his muse—with introducing him to the fashion industry. At the time of his death, Armani's sister, nieces, and nephew were all closely involved in his business empire.

=== Relationships ===
Armani was an intensely private man, but said in an interview with Vanity Fair that he had relationships with both men and women. He had a longstanding personal relationship with his business partner, the architect, fashion designer and businessman Sergio Galeotti, who died of complications from AIDS in 1985. Armani credited Galeotti with empowering him to pursue the business. Reflecting in 2015, Armani said of Galeotti, "When I travel, I bring his photograph. There is something that remains. His spirit lingers. For sure. He lives on. I see Sergio everywhere, and I am sure he sees me. And I have hope that whatever I have done, he knows about it." Armani described his inability to prevent Galeotti's death as the greatest failure of his career. According to Armani's family, he spent much of his time on his yacht and loved sailing.

Despite being open about his sexuality, Armani sometimes expressed personal views on the public expression of homosexuality. In 2015, in an interview with The Sunday Times, he said, "A homosexual man is 100% a man. He doesn't need to dress like a homosexual."

=== Death ===
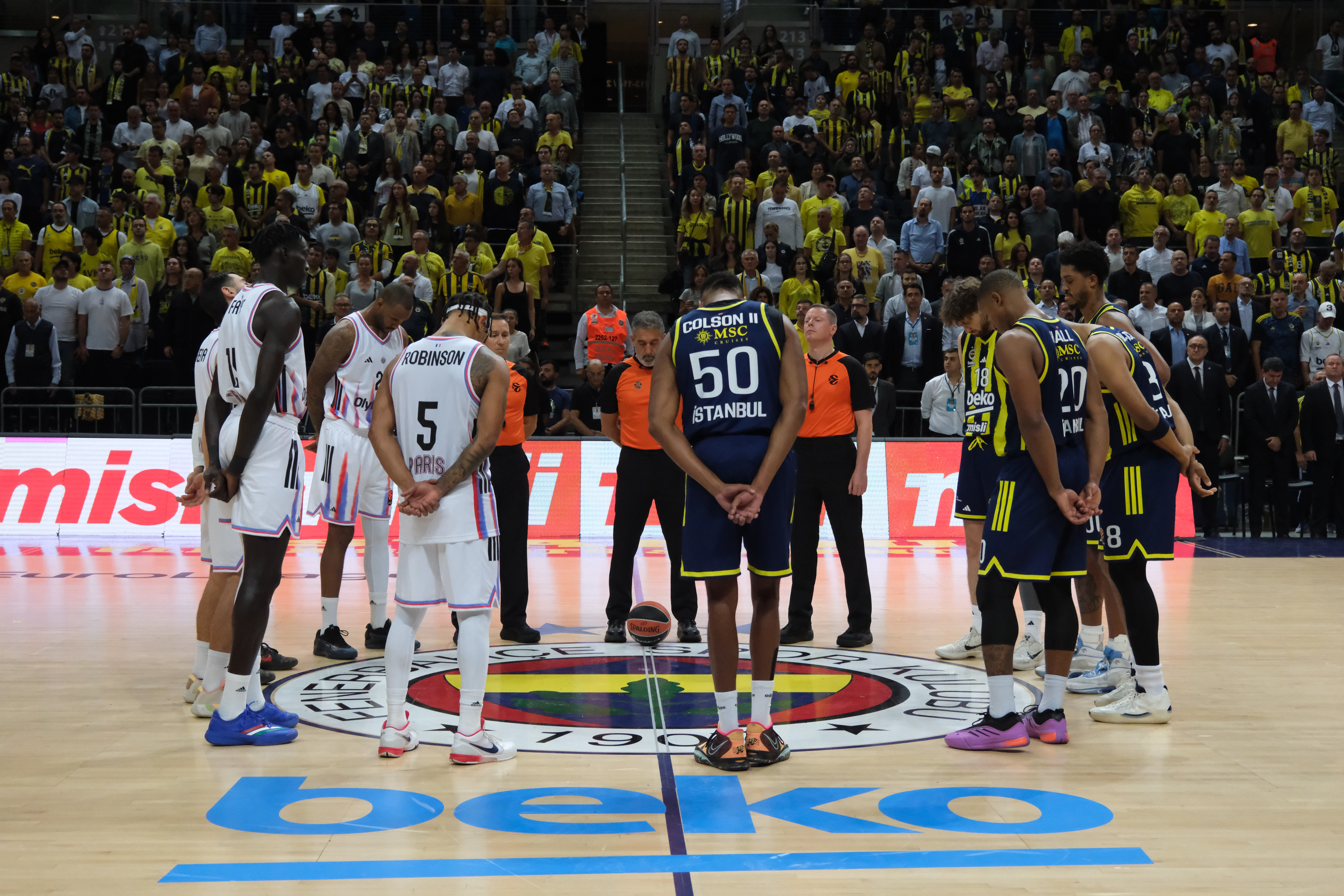
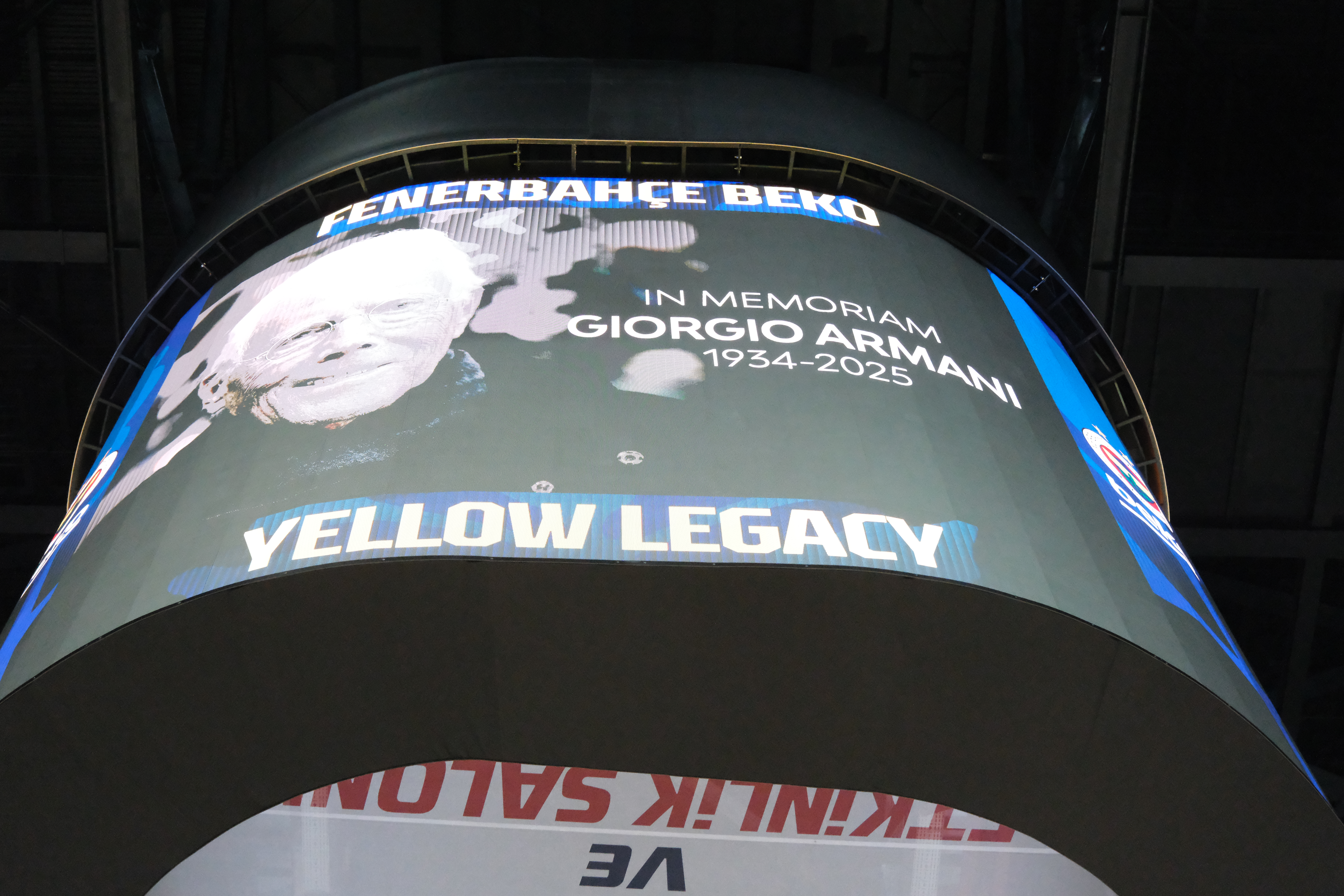
2025–26 EuroLeague first week moment of silence for Giorgio Armani

Armani was reportedly in declining health in the months leading up to his death, and was notably absent from Milan Fashion Week in June 2025, marking the first time he did not attend his own runway shows. He died from liver failure at his home in Milan on 4 September 2025 at the age of 91. At the time of his death, Forbes estimated his net worth at $12.1 billion. His public wake was held at the Armani/Teatro in Milan, and was attended by around 15,000 people. On 8 September, the day of his funeral, all Armani stores closed for an afternoon of mourning, including the city of Milan. He was buried in a private ceremony at his family's chapel in Rivalta di Gazzola, Piacenza Province. On 12 September, his two final wills were released, in which he left instructions that included his heirs having to sell an initial 15% minority stake in his businesses, with priority to LVMH, EssilorLuxottica or L'Oreal.

== Legacy ==
Throughout his career, Armani's course was defined by his impact on the fashion industry, mainly reinventing suit wear for women. Upon his death, the BBC said that Armani "revolutionised fashion" and that no fashion designer had as "lasting change in the way people dress" since Coco Chanel. Le Monde called Armani "one of the last great makers of modern fashion".

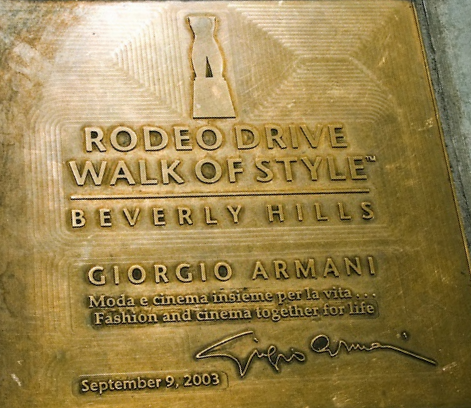
Armani's honor at the Walk of Style in Beverly Hills

Armani was noted for loosening the restrictions of stiffer styles of suit wear, helping to make men wearing suits feel sophisticated while empowering women in formal settings such as work. The New York Times labeled Armani as the "Fashion's Master of the Power Suit", while also citing his impact towards celebrity fashion and "red-carpet dressing". Armani had a broad level of influence internationally; this was because his expertise extended far beyond just clothes and accessories of haute couture. Rather, Armani's work was often seen as art rather than solely fashion; for example, the Guggenheim Museum in New York hosted an exhibition of Armani's work – a first for a living designer – with an average attendance of 29,000 a week. This was referenced by Larry Shiner and Yulia Kriskovets in The Journal of Aesthetics and Art Criticism.

In 2001, Armani was acclaimed as the "most successful designer of Italian origin" by Vogue. That same year, Time reflected Armani's career, stating that he "forever changed the way people think about clothes", something that most fashion designers rarely accomplish. Armani was also the first designer to ban underweight models from the runway, after the death of Ana Carolina Reston (who had modeled for his company) in 2006 from anorexia nervosa.

His death provoked a wide international reaction among political and cultural figures. Italian Prime Minister Giorgia Meloni said that Armani was a "symbol of the best of Italy". French businessman Bernard Arnault credited Armani for creating a "unique style" of fashion and for pushing "Italian elegance to a global scale". For his services and impact towards the fashion industry, he was honored with an Officer of the Legion of Honour in 2008 and a Knight Grand Cross of the Order of Merit of the Italian Republic in 2021.

== Honours and awards ==
- 1979: Neiman Marcus Award for Distinguished Service in the Field of Fashion
- 1983: Honored by the Council of Fashion Designers of America (CFDA) as best international designer
- 1987: Lifetime Achievement Award for menswear by CFDA
- 2008 France: Officer of the Legion of Honour
- 2014: Compasso d'Oro Career Award
- 2019: Outstanding Achievement Award at The Fashion Awards
- 2021: Italy: Knight Grand Cross of the Order of Merit of the Italian Republic

== See also ==
- Italian fashion
- List of fashion designers

== Bibliography ==
- Molho, Renata (2007). Being Armani: A Biography. Milan: Baldini Castoldi Dalai. ISBN 978-88-6073-296-5.
- Potvin, John (2013). Giorgio Armani: Empire of the Senses (1st ed.). Routledge. ISBN 9781409406686.
- Pagano, Frank; Di Dio Roccazzella, Marco (2025). Giorgio Armani. The Man, the Brand and the Company. Milan: Bocconi University Press. ISBN 9791280623683.

== Sources ==
- Mackenzie, Suzie (11 December 2004). "The gentle touch". The Guardian. Archived from the original on 18 February 2024.
- McCartney, Stella (16 May 2006). "The wisdom of King Giorgio". The Independent. Archived from the original on 16 January 2009.
- "Q & A: Giorgio Armani". The Scene. CNN. 3 October 2006. Archived from the original on 12 October 2010.
- Schinke, Amanda (7 October 2008). "Liar, Liar, Armani on Fire!". PETA. Archived from the original on 22 February 2010.
- Giorgio Armani – The Businessman, the Designer and the Brand; Archived 5 July 2010 at the Wayback Machine
