= Ana Carolina Reston =

Brazilian model

- Born: Ana Carolina Reston Macan; June 4, 1985; Jundiaí, São Paulo, Brazil
- Died: November 15, 2006 (aged 21); São Paulo, Brazil
- Cause of death: Infection caused by eating disorder
- Years active: 1998–2006
- Modeling information
- Height: 1.68 m (5 ft 6 in)
- Hair color: Light Brown
- Eye color: Hazel
- Agency: Ford Models; Elite Model Management; L'Équipe

Ana Carolina Reston Macan (June 4, 1985 – November 15, 2006) was a Brazilian model.

== Biography ==
Reston was born to a middle-class family in Jundiaí, on the outskirts of São Paulo, Brazil. At the age of 13, she began her modeling career after winning a local beauty contest in her hometown in 1999. Despite being shorter than the usual model at 1.68 m (5 ft 6 in), she was represented by renowned modeling agencies such as Ford, Elite and L'equipe (L'equipe is a modeling agency in Sao Paulo.) She was represented in countries such as China, Turkey, Mexico, and Japan, and appeared in prestigious ad campaigns such as Giorgio Armani. During her career, she listed her height as just over 5 ft 7 in.

In January 2004 Reston made her first overseas trip to Guangzhou, China. While attending a casting call there, she was reportedly informed that she was 'too fat', a criticism, it has been said, that led to her decline into anorexia nervosa. The model's cousin reported that Reston also suffered from bulimia nervosa.

== Personal life ==
=== Death ===
Reston died on November 15, 2006. At the time of her death, Reston weighed just 40 kg (88 lbs) at a height of 1.68 m (5 ft 6 in), and had been hospitalized since October 25, 2006, for kidney malfunction due to anorexia nervosa and bulimia nervosa, which included a diet consisting only of apples and tomatoes. She had a body mass index (BMI) of only 14.1, well below the index value of 16 which the World Health Organization considers to be severe thinness. Her condition became more serious and deteriorated into generalized infection that led to her death at the age of 21.

Reston's mother Miriam told the Estado de Sao Paulo newspaper, "I noticed something was wrong when she returned from Japan. She was too thin when she returned and when I told her to eat something, she would say: 'Mom please don't fight with me; there is nothing wrong with me, I'm fine.'"

Reston was the second model who was reported to have died of anorexia-related complications in 2006, after 22-year-old Luisel Ramos. As a result of Reston's death, Giorgio Armani stopped using models with low body mass indexes.

== See also ==
- List of deaths from anorexia nervosa
