= Armani =

Italian international luxury fashion house

Giorgio Armani S.p.A.

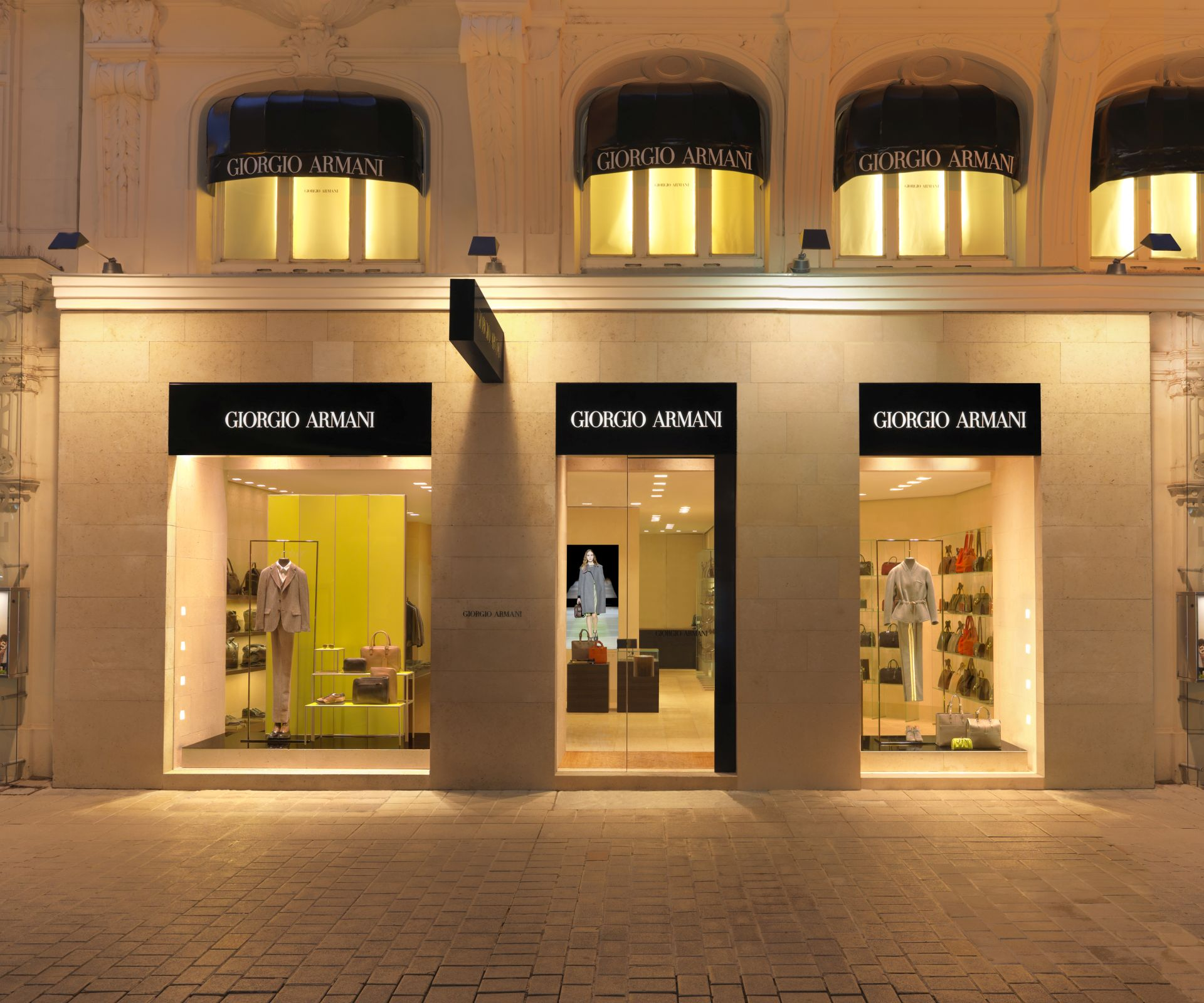
- Storefront in Vienna, Austria
- Type: Private
- Industry: Fashion; leisure
- Founded: 1975; 51 years ago
- Founders: Giorgio Armani Sergio Galeotti
- Headquarters: 45.4616855°N 9.1700768°E, Milan, Italy
- Area served: Worldwide
- Key people: Giuseppe Marsocci (CEO); Silvana Armani (Creative director, Giorgio Armani and Armani Privé); Pantaleo Dell'Orco (Creative director, Giorgio Armani and Armani Privé); Dario Vitale (Creative director, Emporio Armani)
- Revenue: €2.3 billion (2024)
- Net income: €90 million (2020)
- Total equity: €4.3 Billion (2024)
- Owner: Giorgio Armani Foundation (controlling stake; 85%); LVMH (expected 15% stake under succession plan)
- Number of employees: 10,500 (2025)
- Website: armani.com

Giorgio Armani S.p.A. (Italian: [ˈdʒordʒo arˈmaːni]), commonly known as Armani, is an Italian luxury fashion house founded in Milan by Giorgio Armani which designs, manufactures, distributes and retails haute couture, ready-to-wear, leather goods, shoes, accessories, and home interiors. Among others, Armani licenses its name and branding to Luxottica for eyewear and L'Oréal for fragrances and cosmetics. As of 2017, it is considered Italy's second-largest fashion group behind Prada.

In addition to the couture line Armani Privé, Giorgio Armani and Emporio Armani are the company's ready-to-wear lines that show at Milan Fashion Week. Selling at lower prices is Armani Exchange.

== History ==
Armani and his partner, architect Sergio Galeotti, founded Giorgio Armani SpA in 1975, reportedly on money from the sale of Armani's Volkswagen Beetle car for $700.

In 1978, Armani signed a license with Gruppo Finanziario Tessile (GFT). In 1991, Armani entered into a manufacturing and distribution license with Simint, when the company launched A|X Armani Exchange. By 1993, the Armani name was represented by 23 licensees and two large joint ventures in Japan.

By the 1990s, the company's strategy was to cancel licenses and take production in-house in a bid to exert more control over quality and distribution. Manufacturing arrangements later brought back in-house include the acquisition of Antinea (1990), Simint (1996) and Intai (1998). In 2000, after buying factories from GFT, Armani formed a joint venture with Zegna for the production and distribution of the Collezioni men's collection. Armani also increased to 85 percent of its share in the joint venture in Japan with Itochu.

In 2001, Armani commissioned architect Tadao Ando to transform an old Nestlé chocolate factory in Milan's Savona/Tortona area into the company's headquarters.

Also in the early 2000s, Armani opened five megastores designed by Massimiliano and Doriana Fuksas, starting with the opening of the Armani/Manzoni store in Milan in 2000, which carries all of the company's brands. Other such venues are in Hong Kong (Armani/Chater House, opened in 2002), Munich (Armani/Fünf Höfe, opened in 2003), Tokyo (Armani/Ginza Tower, opened in 2007) and New York City (Armani/Fifth Avenue, opened in 2009).

In 2002, Armani announced a new joint venture with the shoe manufacturer I Guardi, as part of a strategy of bringing manufacturing under its control. Beginning in 2007, the company teamed up with Samsung to develop a line of high-end electronic goods.

In 2007, Giorgio Armani confirmed to Reuters that he had been approached by Beiersdorf in 2005 about a potential merger but had since been too distracted by other projects to pursue that option. In 2016, he confirmed he had established the Giorgio Armani Foundation which, while aiming to fund social projects, is also to "safeguard the governance assets of the Armani Group and ensure that these assets are kept stable over time." As part of his succession plan, the foundation will own an undisclosed stake in the company, with the rest going to his family. By 2017, the company was seen as a prime candidate for a stock market listing. In 2021, Giorgio Armani ruled out merging with either LVMH or Kering and reportedly also ruled out an offer by Stellantis to acquire a minority stake.

In February 2020, Armani was the first fashion brand to decide to close its runway shows to the public amid the beginning COVID-19 pandemic, holding the event without an audience. By March 2020, all of its Italian production plants started producing single-use medical overalls.

In 2021, luxury yacht maker The Italian Sea Group announced that Giorgio Armani SpA would invest in the company's IPO at the Italian Bourse.

Despite promising to suspend investments in Russia, Giorgio Armani continues to operate in the country amid the Russian invasion of Ukraine. While the brand held a silent Milan Fashion Week show in February 2022 as a "sign of respect" for Ukraine, it has not reduced its activities or signaled plans to exit the Russian market. This ongoing presence has drawn criticism as international sanctions target Russia for its aggression and the killing of civilians in Ukraine. Giorgio Armani is among several European companies that remain operational in Russia, sparking questions about their ethical and corporate responsibilities during the conflict.

In April 2024, Giorgio Armani Operations was placed in judicial administration in Italy after an investigation alleging that the company employed illegal and undeclared Chinese labor workers.

On September 4, 2025, Giorgio died at the age of 91.

In September 2025, following the death of Giorgio Armani, details of his succession plan were made public. His will instructed the Giorgio Armani Foundation and heirs to sell an initial 15% stake in the company within 18 months to a "preferred" luxury group, including LVMH, L'Oréal, or EssilorLuxottica. The agreement also allows the buyer to acquire up to 54.9% of the business over the next three to five years. Should no sale take place, the company could pursue an initial public offering. The Foundation is required to retain at least 30% of Armani's shareholding to safeguard the brand's independence and legacy.

== Controversy ==
In 1999, the New York Times and others raised concerns about a generous donation made by Giorgio Armani SpA to the Solomon R. Guggenheim Museum in New York shortly before the museum announced that it would pay homage to Armani himself with a major retrospective of his work.

In a 2014 report, Greenpeace publicly criticized Armani and other luxury brands after having found traces of chemicals that can pollute waterways in children's clothing and shoes; in response, the company committed to abolishing all chemicals that could cause environmental damage to production sites by 2020. Also in 2014, Giorgio Armani SpA paid 270 million euros to Italian tax authorities to settle a dispute over payments from the group's subsidiaries abroad.

In 2015, Giorgio Armani Corp's former general counsel Fabio Silva filed a $75 million lawsuit in the New York Supreme Court against the company, accusing it of discriminating against him because of his Mexican origins and firing him for having cancer.

On July 17, 2024, the Italian competition authority, Autorità Garante della Concorrenza e del Mercato (AGCM), announced the launch of an investigation into Armani and Dior. The probe aims to determine whether these companies potentially misled consumers regarding their labor practices and supply chain management. Prosecutors claim to have discovered workshops on the outskirts of Milan where mostly illegal immigrant workers sold products to Armani as well as Dior for a fraction of their retail price. By August 2025, AGCM fined Giorgio Armani group and one of its units 3.5 million euros ($4 million) for alleged unfair commercial practices in its bag and leather accessory production.

== Brands ==
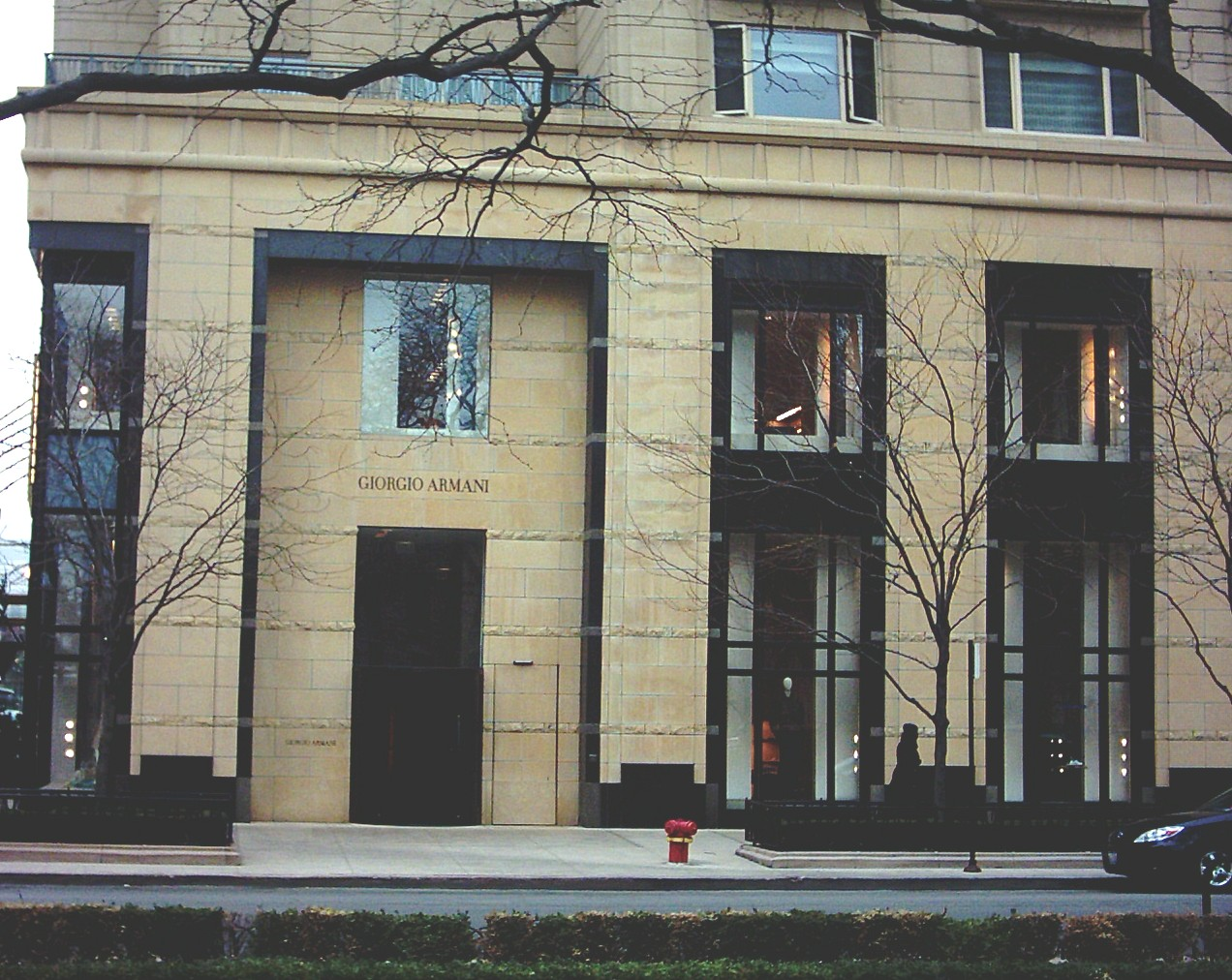
The former site of the Giorgio Armani boutique in Chicago

=== Giorgio Armani ===
Giorgio Armani (originally Giorgio Armani Borgonuovo) is a high-end label specialising in men's and women's ready-to-wear, accessories, glasses, cosmetics, and perfumes. It is available in Giorgio Armani stores, speciality clothiers, and some high-end department stores. The logo is a curved "G" completing a curved "A", forming a circle. In 2001, Armani created a joint venture with Vestimenta for the production of the men's and women's Borgonuovo line.

Giorgio Armani worked with Albert Wolsky for Duplicity (2009), with Lindy Hemming on the costumes for the cast of both The Dark Knight (2008) and The Dark Knight Rises (2012), with April Ferry for Elysium (2013) and with Sandy Powell for The Wolf of Wall Street (2013). Other costume design projects have included American Gigolo (1980), The Untouchables (1987), A Star for Two (1991), The Bodyguard (1992), Nirvana (1997), Hurlyburly (1998), Ocean's Thirteen (2007), Inglourious Basterds (2009), The String (2009), Hanna (2011), Mission: Impossible – Ghost Protocol (2011), A Most Violent Year (2014) and The Young Pope (2016).

For its campaigns, the brand has worked with photographers including Sølve Sundsbø (2015), Peter Lindbergh (2017) and Mert Alas and Marcus Piggott (2019). In 2016, Giorgio Armani stopped using animal fur in all of its collections, citing the availability of "valid alternatives at our disposition that render the use of cruel practices unnecessary as regards animals".

=== Armani Privé ===
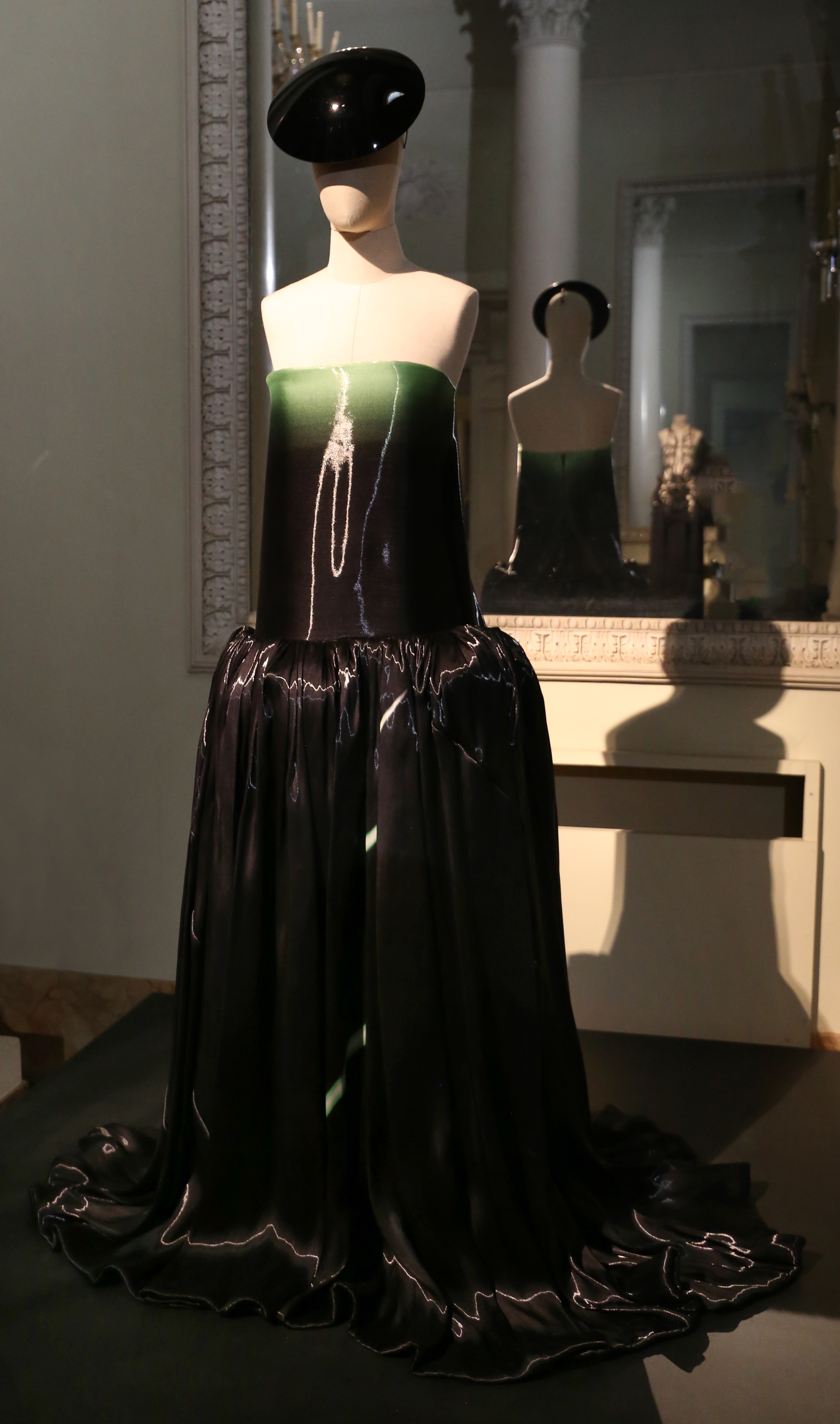
Armani Privé dress

Previously labeled Giorgio Armani Atelier, Armani Privé is the label for the designer's made-to-order pieces. Under the Privé label, the brand offers a couture collection, fragrances such as Bois d'Encens (2004), and jewelry.

=== Emporio Armani ===
Emporio Armani logo

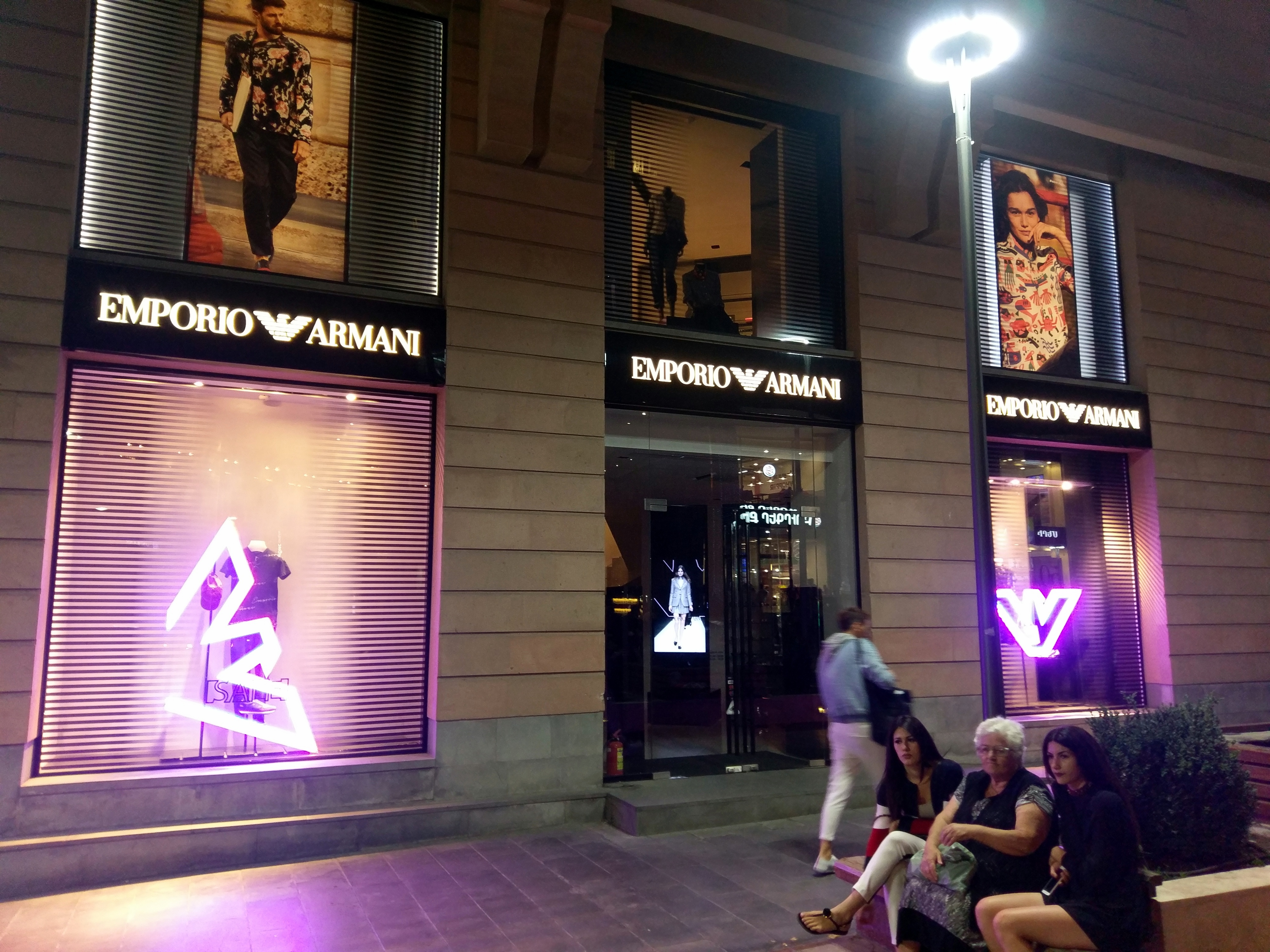
Emporio Armani at Yerevan's Northern Avenue

Established in 1981, Emporio Armani is the second brand of the Armani family and features ready-to-wear and runway collections. Emporio Armani focuses on trends and modern traits. Emporio Armani, along with Giorgio Armani, were the only two ready-to-wear brands mainly designed by Giorgio Armani himself, and have a spotlight at Milan Fashion Week every year while Armani Collezioni, Armani Jeans, and Armani Exchange do not. Emporio Armani products are usually only sold in freestanding Emporio Armani stores and on the official website.

Emporio Armani underwear campaigns have featured David Beckham (2008–2010), Victoria Beckham (2009), Cristiano Ronaldo (2010), Megan Fox (2010), Rihanna (2011), Rafael Nadal (2011) and Calvin Harris (2015). The brand's watch ad campaign has featured Shawn Mendes (2019), among others. For its campaigns, the brand has worked with photographers including Alasdair McLellan (2012) and Mert Alas and Marcus Piggott. In 2013, Emporio Armani provided costume design for the cast of The Counselor in partnership with 21st Century Fox

==== EA7 ====
In 2004, Emporio Armani collaborated with Reebok to produce fashion shoes under the label EA7. Emporio Armani is the official kit supplier of Italian football club Napoli under the EA7 brand. In basketball, the brand is the title sponsor and kit supplier of Olimpia Milano, and from the 2023/24 season it became the official kit supplier of Blu Basket 1971.

=== Giorgio Armani Occhiali ===
In 1987, Giorgio Armani Occhiali (lit. 'Giorgio Armani Glasses') was established. In 1988, the company entered into a licensing agreement with Luxottica for eyewear. From 2003 until 2012, Safilo Group held the exclusive licence for Armani-branded eyewear before it returned to Luxottica until 2037. As part of the brand's first eyewear collection in 2021, it included a pair of oval-shaped wire-rimmed silver glasses that Giorgio Armani wore, in both sunglass and reading versions, since the late 1980s.

=== Armani Exchange ===
Armani Exchange logo

A|X Armani Exchange was launched in 1991 in the United States. It retails fashion and lifestyle products inspired by 'street-chic culture' and dance music. It is positioned as the more accessible Armani brand, and has occasionally used provocative advertising.

A|X Armani Exchange products are available in 270 stores across 31 countries and on the brand's website. The line was an early adopter of online communication and retailing, launching its armaniexchange.com site in 1995 and introducing online sales in 1997.

To support the development of the line, Giorgio Armani co-established the joint venture company Presidio Holdings Ltd in 2005 alongside Como Holdings, the company owned by the Singaporean businessman Ong Beng Seng, which had held the production and distribution licence for A|X Armani Exchange in the United States, Canada, Central and South America and Asia-Pacific since 1994. By 2006, A|X Armani Exchange launched a sunglasses line under licence with Safilo.

Initially, Giorgio Armani held 25% of Presidio Holdings, with the remaining 75% held by Como Holdings. In 2008, Giorgio Armani acquired an additional 25% stake. In 2014, it acquired the remaining 50%, gaining full ownership of the brand, which then had 270 stores and over 3,000 employees, according to a company statement.

In 2008, A|X Armani Exchange redesigned its logo. As part of a relaunch and repositioning plan initiated in 2014, the collection was gradually introduced in Europe.

A|X Armani Exchange campaigns have included Cara Delevingne (2017), Martin Garrix (2017) and Li Yifeng (2017).

=== Armani Junior and Armani Baby ===
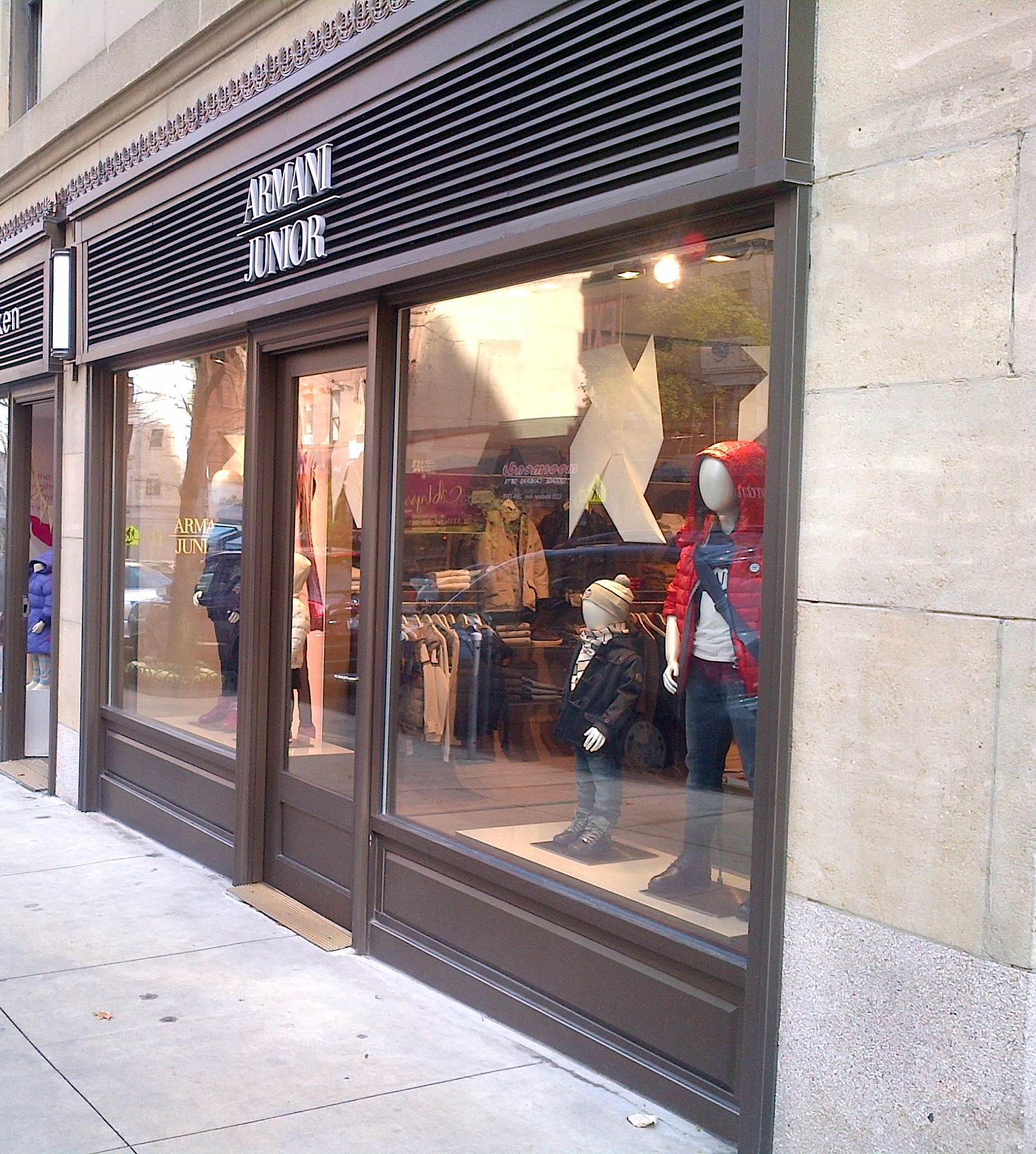
An Armani Junior boutique in New York City

Armani designs clothing and accessories for children under the labels Armani Junior and Armani Baby. Armani Baby is targeted at children up to four years old, while Armani Junior covers ages five to 14. The Armani Junior line was introduced in 1979. It includes items such as T-shirts, pullovers, suits, shoes, hats, shirts, belts, bags, and underwear. In 2006, Armani signed a licensing agreement with Mirella Srl for the production and distribution of footwear for both lines.

Armani Junior operates 167 independent stores worldwide, selling only the sub-label. Products from both lines are also available in other Armani stores, including Armani/Casa, Armani Jeans, and Emporio Armani. Overall, 308 independent and franchise Armani stores carry Armani Junior and Armani Baby products globally. The lines are additionally sold in selected department stores, including Neiman Marcus, Saks Fifth Avenue, Breuninger and Peek & Cloppenburg. In May 2014, actress Quvenzhané Wallis became the face of Armani Junior.

=== Giorgio Armani Neve ===
Launched in 1995, Armani developed a collection of men's and women's ski wear and apres-ski casualwear called Giorgio Armani Neve (lit. 'Giorgio Armani Snow'), produced by the Skinea company, a division of Gruppo Belfe. It was re-launched in 2022.

=== Giorgio Armani Orologi ===
Giorgio Armani Orologi (lit. 'Giorgio Armani Watches') was established in 1997. In 2014, the company entered into a licensing agreement with Fossil for watches and jewelry. In 2021, Giorgio Armani launched a namesake fine watches collection in collaboration with Swiss watchmaker Parmigiani Fleurier, the first such project for the designer.

=== Armani/Casa ===
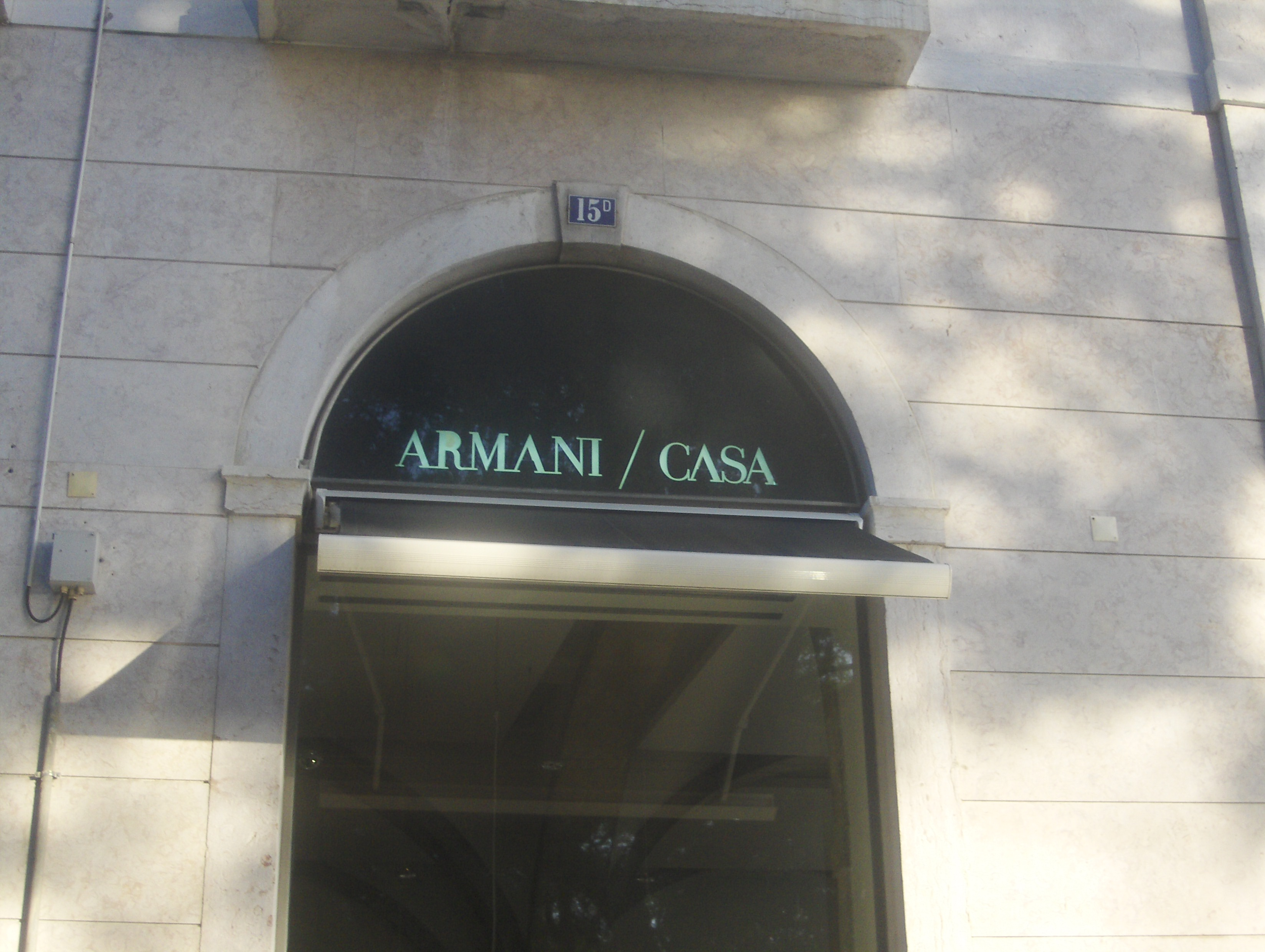
An Armani/Casa boutique in Lisbon, Portugal, December 2007

Armani/Casa is a furniture and home collection under the Giorgio Armani label. The Italian word "casa" in this context translates as "at home". The collection was launched in 2000 with a flagship store in Milan, Italy. Giorgio Armani stated that the line was intended to allow people to design their private homes and that creating it helped stimulate his creative work.

Armani/Casa works with Rubelli and the Molteni Group for fabrics and furniture production. The collection includes kitchens under the Armani/Dada sub-label in partnership with the Molteni Group, fabrics by Rubelli, and bathroom furniture and accessories through a collaboration with Roca under Armani/Roca. The collection is distributed through 183 independent Armani stores and other retailers worldwide.

Products from Armani/Casa are also used in Armani hotels, in private residences such as John Mayer's New York City apartment, and in film set designs, including the 2013 film Paranoia.

In 2017, as part of a corporate restructuring, Armani/Casa and Giorgio Armani Privé were incorporated into the main Giorgio Armani brand.

=== Armani/Dolci ===
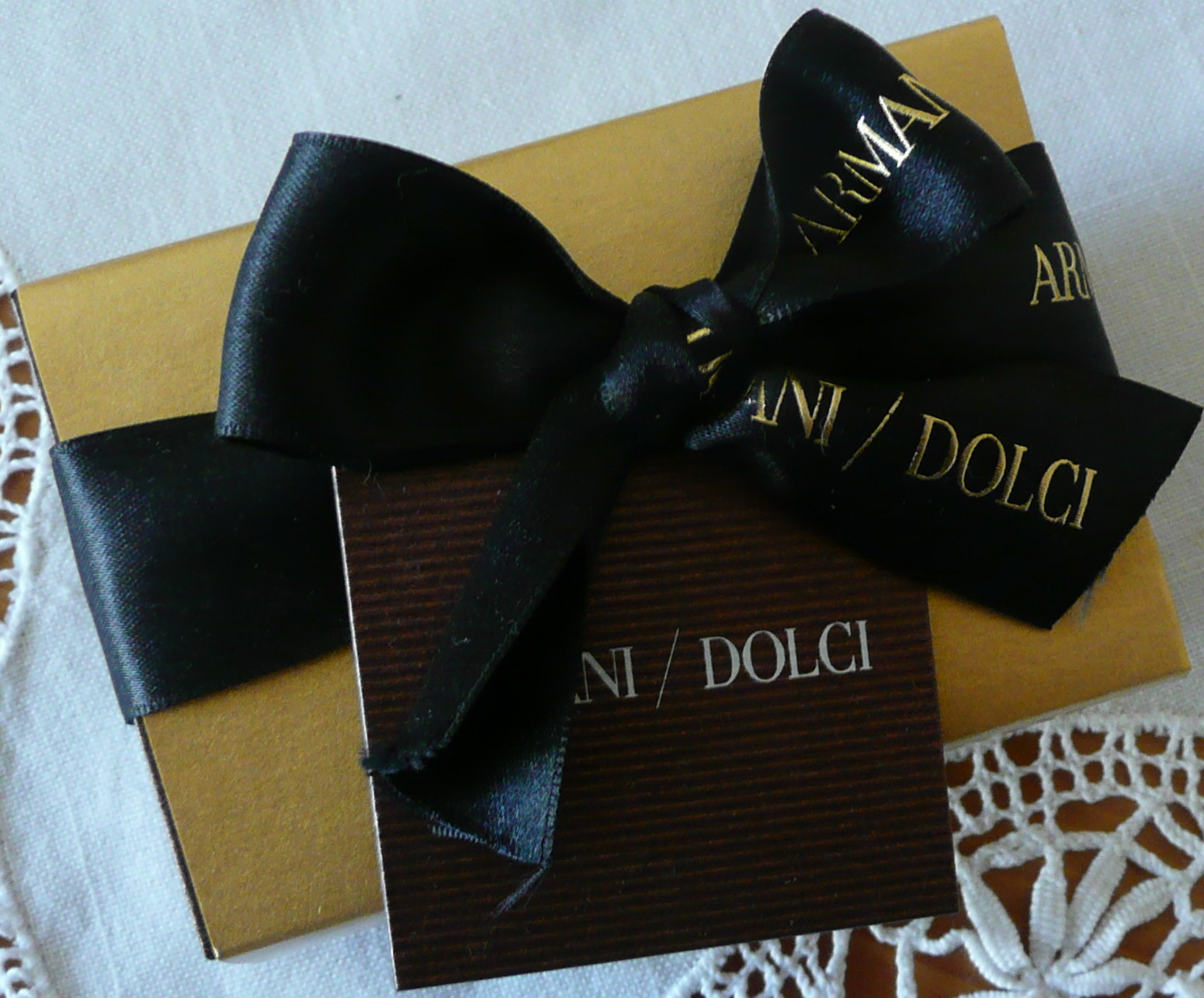
A 2008 Armani/Dolci gift box

Armani/Dolci (lit. 'Armani/Sweets') is a confectionery brand under the Giorgio Armani label. The brand was established in 2002. Armani collaborates with the Italian chocolate manufacturer Guido Gobino for its products.

The brand produces chocolates, jams, honey, tea, shortbread biscuits, sugar and pralines. Products are available in most Armani stores and in a dedicated boutique in Taichung, Taiwan. In total, 152 stores carry Armani/Dolci products.

Armani/Dolci has released limited collections for seasonal and special occasions. Examples include chocolate Easter eggs, heart-shaped boxes with chocolate truffles for Valentine's Day, and collections for Ramadan designed to comply with Islamic dietary rules. Special collections are also issued for Christmas and company anniversaries.

=== Armani/Fiori ===
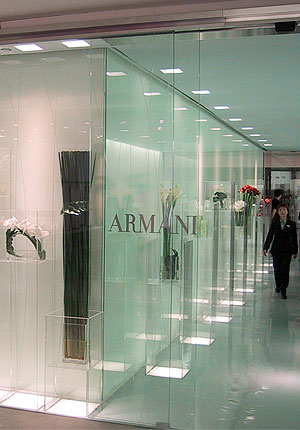
Armani/Fiori boutique at Chater House in Hong Kong

The Giorgio Armani label includes a florist service under the name Armani/Fiori (lit. 'Armani/Flowers'). The service has been active since 2000 in major independent flower stores and other Armani stores worldwide.

The flowers used for Armani/Fiori arrangements are primarily sourced from the Netherlands. The label uses a range of orchids, exotic and tropical flowers, and traditional varieties such as hydrangeas, roses and peonys. Collections were designed by Giorgio Armani.

In addition to floral arrangements, Armani/Fiori produces decorative items including vases, flowerpots, candles and lanterns. Materials used in collections include alabaster, black marble, and lacquered wood, formed into cylinders, cubes, and rhomboids. Giorgio Armani has created floral arrangements for seasonal occasions such as Valentine's Day and spring collections. The floral arrangements are also supplied to Armani hotels.

=== Armani/Hotels ===
In 2005, Giorgio Armani and Emaar Properties PJSC signed an agreement for Emaar Properties to build and operate a series of luxury hotels and vacation resorts under the Armani name. Armani was responsible for overseeing the interior design and style of the hotels.

The first Armani Hotel opened on 27 April 2010 in the Burj Khalifa in Dubai, United Arab Emirates, occupying the lower 39 floors of the tower. The hotel comprises 160 guest rooms and suites, as well as 144 residences. Giorgio Armani also designed the interiors of the associated Armani Residences, incorporating elements from the Armani/Casa home furnishings collection and floral arrangements from Armani/Fiori. The "Burj Khalifa Armani Residences Road Show" was held in Milan, London, Jeddah, Moscow and New Delhi; the London event took place at the Armani Casa showroom on New Bond Street.

A second Armani hotel opened in 2011 in Milan, located in a palazzo on Via Manzoni in the city centre.

=== Armani/Privé Club ===
Armani operates two clubs under the Armani/Privé name, located in Milan and Dubai. The clubs feature resident DJs and offer signature cocktails.

=== Luggage ===
In 1994, Giorgio Armani signed a licensing agreement with Redwall to produce and distribute bags and small leather luggage items for the Borgonuovo, Giorgio Armani Collezioni and Emporio Armani lines. In 2008, the company launched the Luxury Traveller Collection, featuring handcrafted luggage for men and women.

=== Jewellery ===
In 2019, Giorgio Armani Privé Haute Jewellery made its debut in New York. The same year, the brand presented its first high jewellery collection.

The 2022 "Josephine" collection, inspired by Joséphine de Beauharnais, incorporated paisley motifs with chalcedony and grey diamonds. Armani's fine jewellery has been worn by celebrities, including Sophia Loren, Brie Larson and Brooke Shields, at high-profile events.

=== Beauty products ===
In 1980, Armani entered a licensing agreement with L'Oreal for the production and distribution of fragrances, cosmetics, and beauty products. The brand launched its first women's fragrance in 1982 and its first men's fragrance in 1984. In 2008, they released a collection of three fragrances: Onde Mystere, Onde Vertige, and Onde Extase.

Giorgio Armani cosmetics campaigns have included Beyoncé (2008), Kasia Smutniak (2009), Megan Fox (2010), Cate Blanchett (2013), Valentina Sampaio (2021), Tessa Thompson (2022), Regé-Jean Page (2022), Sydney Sweeney (2023), Aaron Taylor-Johnson (2024) and Kendall Jenner (2026).

== Former Brands ==
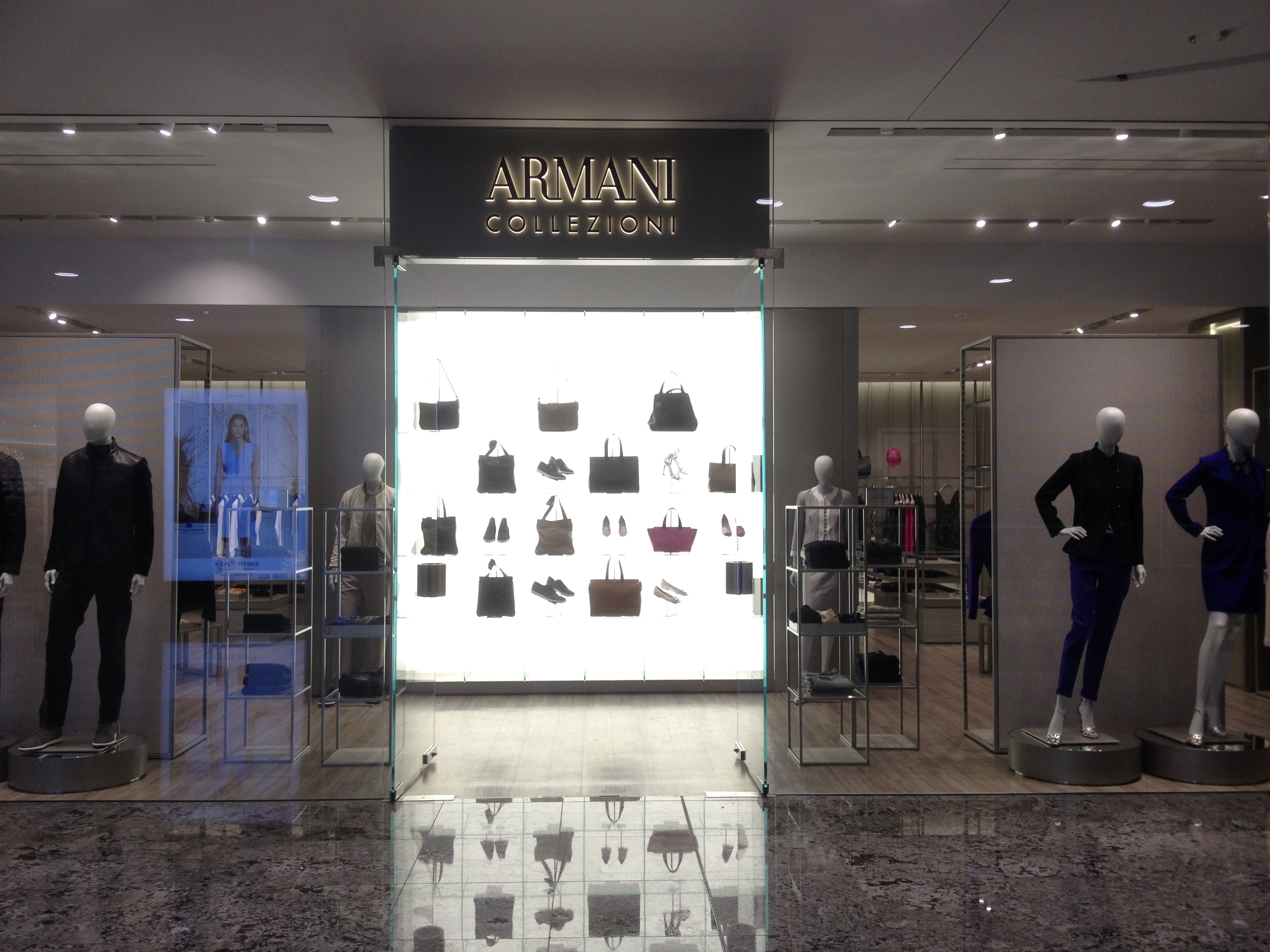
Armani Collezioni at Indooroopilly Shopping Centre

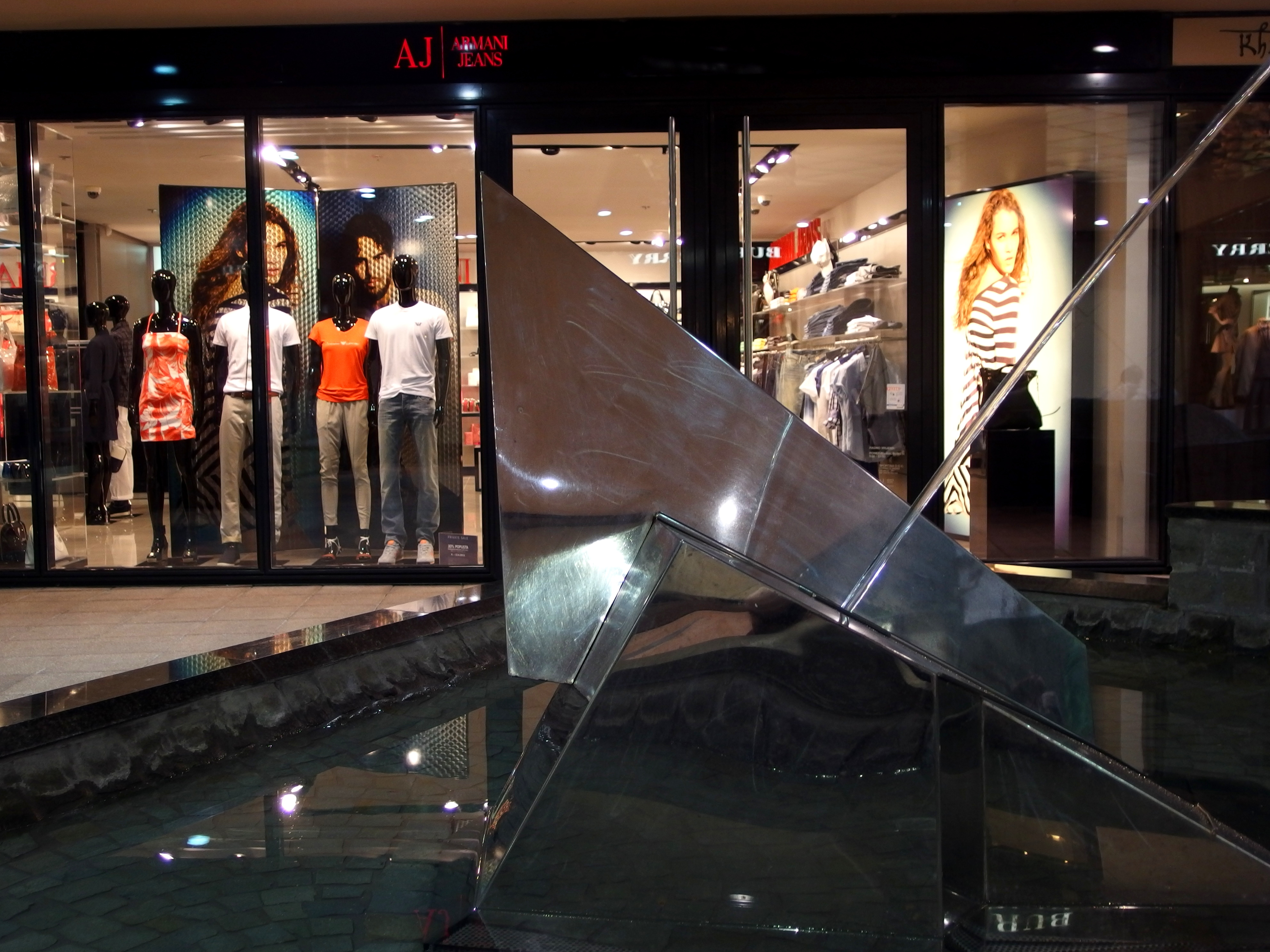
Armani Jeans store in Zagreb, Croatia

=== Armani Collezioni ===
Established in 1979, Armani Collezioni (previously known as Giorgio Armani Le Collezioni for women and Mani for men before 2000) was a diffusion line of Giorgio Armani that retailed at a lower price point than Giorgio Armani and the haute couture line, Armani Privé. The logo was typically displayed in black on a white label, with "Armani" larger and "Collezioni" beneath it, though variations existed.

Armani Collezioni offered made-to-measure tailored suits and shirts, that allowed customers to select individual elements. The line was sold in freestanding stores dedicated exclusively to Collezioni in Milan and Paris, as well as in department stores and outlets. In contrast, Giorgio Armani and Emporio Armani were primarily available in freestanding stores. A sport-oriented sub-line, "Armani Collezioni Active", was also available, similar to the EA7 line from Emporio Armani. As part of a brand restructuring in 2017, Armani Collezioni, along with Armani Jeans, was integrated into Emporio Armani.

=== Armani Jeans ===
Established in 1981, Armani Jeans was a full casual sportswear collection. From 1997, the brand began operating standalone stores. As part of a restructuring in 2017, Armani Jeans, along with Armani Collezioni, was integrated into Emporio Armani.
