= Sergio Galeotti =

Italian architect (1945–1985)

- Born: 26 July 1945; Pietrasanta, Italy
- Died: 14 August 1985 (aged 40); Milan, Italy
- Education: Accademia di Belle Arti di Carrara
- Occupations: Architect; fashion designer

Sergio Galeotti (26 July 1945 – 14 August 1985) was an Italian architect and co-founder of Armani. Galeotti attended the artistic high school in Carrara and worked at several architectural firms in Italy. Giorgio Armani and Galeotti met in Forte dei Marmi, Tuscany, in 1966. Galeotti was a force behind the Armani machine, leading the financial sector and administrative aspects of the company. Armani credited Galeotti as empowering Armani to begin the business.

== Career ==
In order to build capital to begin the Armani label, Galeotti convinced Armani to sell his Volkswagen in order to hire staff and secure office space in Milan. Armani later claimed that it was Galeotti's belief in his potential that gave him the confidence to try to develop the business, saying "Sergio made me believe in myself. He made me see the bigger world." Galeotti also later started his own fashion line.

== Personal life and death ==
Galeotti and Armani had a long personal relationship that served as the backbone of their professional relationship. Galeotti died of complications of AIDS in 1985, though at the time, the cause of death was reported as a heart attack. Armani later recalled that Galeotti's death made him reevaluate his company and life.
