= History of anorexia =

Some claim that the history of anorexia begins with descriptions of religious fasting dating from the Hellenistic era and continuing into the medieval period. A number of well known historical figures, including Catherine of Siena and Mary, Queen of Scots are believed to have suffered from the condition. Others link the emergence of anorexia to the distinctive presence of an extreme fear of being overweight despite being underweight which emerged in the second half of the 19th century and was first observed by Jean Martin Charcot and other French psychiatrists at the Salpêtrière.

Still others credit the English physician Richard Morton, in 1689 for publishing an early account of a case of anorexia nervosa. However it was not until the late 19th century that anorexia nervosa was to be widely accepted by the medical profession as a recognized condition. In 1873, Sir William Gull, one of Queen Victoria's personal physicians, published a seminal paper which established the term anorexia nervosa and provided a number of detailed case descriptions and treatments. In the same year, French physician Ernest-Charles Lasègue similarly published details of a number of cases in a paper entitled De l’Anorexie Hystérique.

Awareness of the condition was largely limited to the medical profession until the latter part of the 20th century, when German-American psychoanalyst Hilde Bruch published her popular work The Golden Cage: the Enigma of Anorexia Nervosa in 1978. This book created a wider awareness of anorexia nervosa among lay readers. A further important event was the death of the popular singer Karen Carpenter in 1983, which prompted widespread ongoing media coverage of eating disorders.

== Etymology ==
The term anorexia nervosa was established in 1873 by Queen Victoria’s personal physician, Sir William Gull. The term anorexia is of Greek origin: an- (ἀν-, prefix denoting negation) and orexis (ὄρεξις, "appetite"), thus translating to "nervous absence of appetite".

In an earlier address, in 1868, Gull referred to the condition as Apepsia hysterica, but subsequently amended this to Anorexia hysterica and then to Anorexia nervosa. In a paper published in 1873, French physician Ernest-Charles Lasègue published a paper entitled De l’Anorexie Hystérique. The use, and subsequent abandonment, of the term hysterica is of interest, since in the Victorian era the term was interpreted as applying to female behaviour. In 1873, Gull wrote:

We might call the state hysterical without committing ourselves to the etymological value of the word, or maintaining that the subjects of it have the common symptoms of hysteria. I prefer, however, the more general term "nervosa," since the disease occurs in males as well as females, and is probably rather central than peripheral. The importance of discriminating such cases in practice is obvious; otherwise prognosis will be erroneous, and treatment misdirected.

== Early descriptions ==
=== Hellenistic–Early Christian Asceticism ===
During the Hellenistic period (323–30 BC) and late antiquity, Asceticism became a prominent spiritual practice in various philosophical and religious traditions. Influenced by Platonic dualism and earlier schools such as Pythagoreanism, certain sects believed that bodily pleasures and needs—including food—distracted the soul from its divine purpose.

Groups like the Encratites, Manichaeans, and other Gnostic communities emphasized bodily denial as a path to salvation. Members of these sects often practiced abstention from meat, wine, sexual activity, and in more extreme cases, food. These beliefs were rooted in a worldview that associated the material body with corruption or evil.

A prominent example of early ascetic practice is the Therapeutae, a Jewish monastic group described by Philo of Alexandria in the 1st century AD. They lived in isolation near Lake Mareotis in Egypt, practiced celibacy, and fasted six days a week as part of their contemplative religious life.

In early Christian theology, writers such as Tertullian promoted extreme fasting as a form of penance and spiritual warfare. His treatise De Iejuniis (On Fasting) outlines practices like “xerophagy”—a dry and minimal diet—as evidence of moral superiority and bodily discipline.

=== Roman Christian Ascetics ===
In 4th-century Rome, Christian asceticism flourished among women of the aristocracy. Under the guidance of Saint Jerome, many affluent Roman women adopted lives of chastity, prayer, and radical fasting. Jerome encouraged asceticism as a spiritual ideal, framing food denial as a way to resist temptation and mortify the flesh.

One of the most well-documented cases is that of Blaesilla, the daughter of Saint Paula. After being widowed at a young age, Blaesilla came under Jerome's mentorship and began practicing extreme asceticism, including prolonged fasting. Within months, she fell seriously ill and died in 384 AD, likely due to self-starvation. Her death caused a public scandal in Rome, with critics accusing Jerome of promoting excessive and dangerous forms of devotion. As a result, Jerome was forced to leave the city and later settled in Bethlehem.

Other Roman women in Jerome’s circle, including Eustochium and Melania the Younger, similarly adopted lives of intense fasting and ascetic withdrawal. Their practices were venerated as examples of Christian virtue, reinforcing cultural ideals that spiritual greatness—especially for women—could be achieved through the suppression of physical needs.

=== 13th and 14th Centuries: Saint Catherine of Siena & Saint Hedwig of Andechs or Silesia ===
Of interest in terms of anorexia nervosa is the medieval practice of self-starvation by women, including some young women, in the name of religious piety and purity continued from ancient traditions. This is sometimes referred to as anorexia mirabilis. By the thirteenth century, it was increasingly common for women to participate in religious life and to even be named as saints by the Catholic Church. Many women who ultimately became saints engaged in self-starvation, including Saint Hedwig of Andechs in the thirteenth century and Catherine of Siena in the fourteenth century. By the time of Catherine of Siena, however, the Church became concerned about extreme fasting as an indicator of spirituality and as a criterion for sainthood. Indeed, Catherine of Siena was told by Church authorities to pray that she would be able to eat again, but was unable to give up fasting.

=== 1556: Mary, Queen of Scots ===
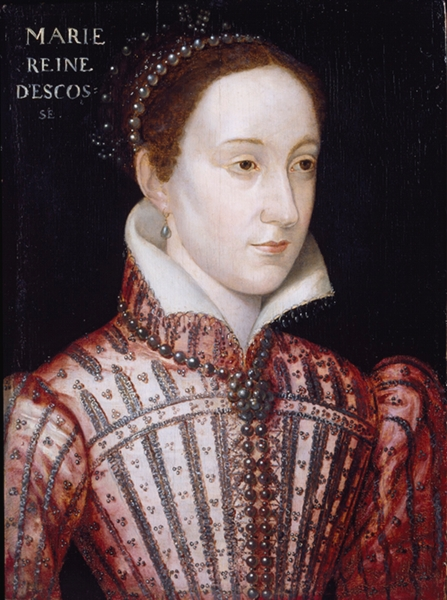
Mary, Queen of Scots

Mary Stuart, known as Mary, Queen of Scots, was brought up as a child in the court of Henry II of France. Her medical history is documented in some detail thanks to the accounts of various ambassadors who sent reports back to their respective sovereigns. It is known, for example, that she had measles when she was five, rubella when she was seven, dysentery and malaria when she was 14 and smallpox when she was 15.

She also had an unnamed illness as a teenager that some now believe to have been anorexia nervosa/chlorosis Her condition is described as involving weight loss, uneven appetite, vomiting and diarrhoea, pallor, fainting fits and breathing difficulties. She was, however, physically active throughout the illness; she continued to ride on horseback and dance in the evenings at the same time as these symptoms were observed.

=== 1613: Jane Balan – the “French fasting girl of Confolens” ===
The case of Jane Balans, the “French Fasting Girl of Confolens,” was described in 1613 by Pedro Mexio. He noted that she “lived without receiving meat or drink for at least three years.” The condition began on 15 February 1599, when Jane Balans was around 10 years old. After suffering a fever and vomiting, she became withdrawn and weakened, refusing all food.

Contemporary superstition blamed the wicked power of an apple given to her by an old woman some months prior to the start of the condition; Mexio diagnosed the case as a “drying up of the liver and of all the parts serving to nourishment due to hurtful humours”

=== 1689: Richard Morton’s case descriptions ===
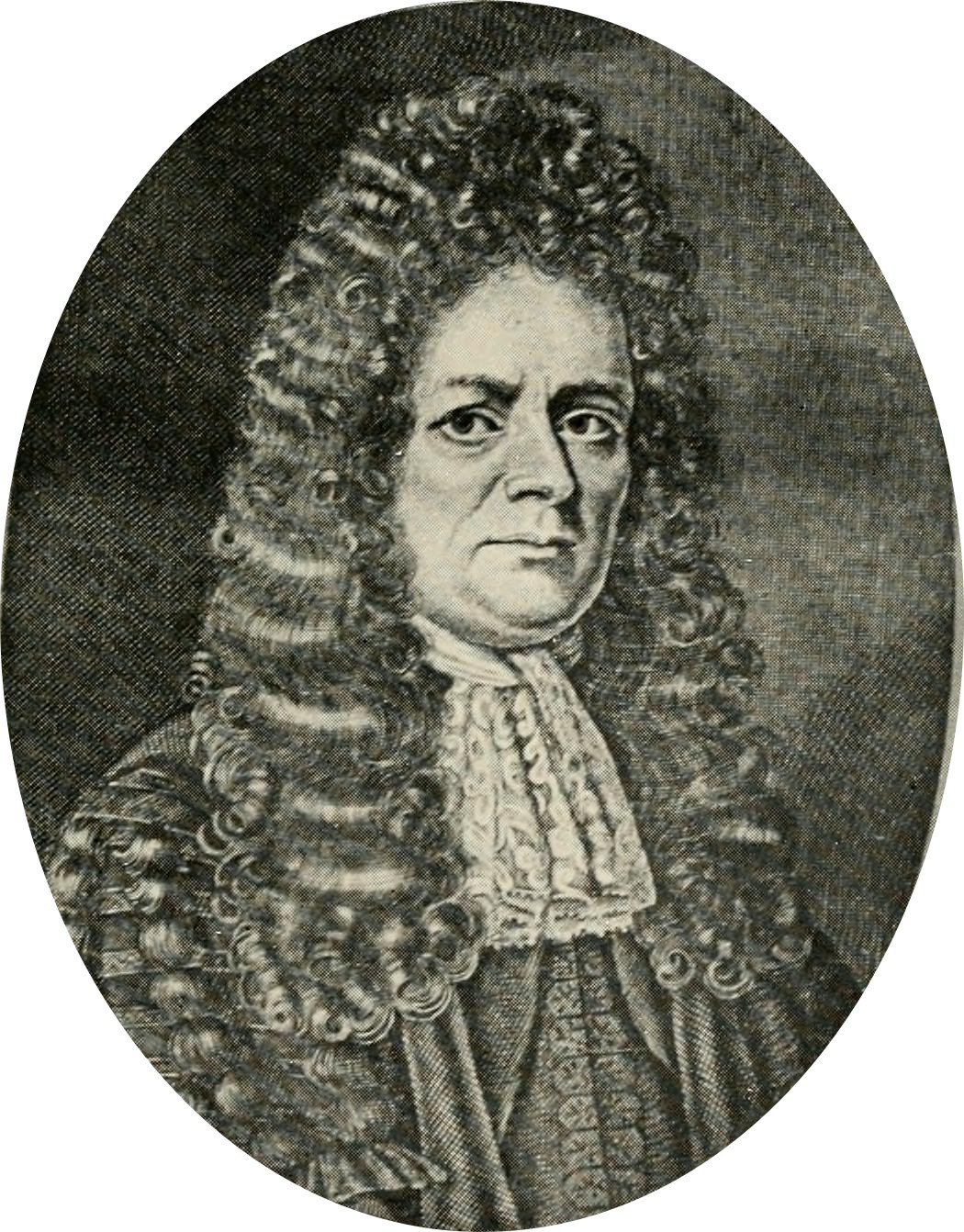
English physician Richard Morton is generally credited with the earliest medical descriptions of the anorexic condition in 1689.

Two early medical descriptions of a syndrome involving loss of appetite and extreme fasting without any evidence of known disease are provided by the English physician Richard Morton in 1689. He provided two case descriptions in his “Phthisiologia: Or, a Treatise of Consumptions,” a 1694 translation of his 1689 work “Phthisiologica, seu exercitationes de phthisi libris comprehensae. Totumque opus variis histories illustratum.” Morton described these cases as “Nervous Atrophy, or Consumption.” The first, in 1684, involved a “Mr Duke’s daughter in St Mary Axe” (a street in the City of London). He writes of her thus:

.. and the Eighteenth year of her Age, in the month of July, fell into a total suppression of her Monthly Courses from a multitude of Cares and Passions of her Mind, but without any of the symptoms of the Green-Sickness following upon it… her appetite began to abate, and her Digestion to be bad; her Flesh also began to be flaccid and loose, and her looks pale, with other symptoms usual in a Universal Consumption of the Habit of the Body.

The girl consulted Dr Morton only after she had been ill for two years, and then only because she experienced frequent fainting fits. Morton described her as a “Skeleton only clad in skin.” He noted her “continual poring upon Books” despite her condition and that she was indifferent to the extreme cold of an unusually severe winter. She refused any treatment (which consisted of the likes of cloves bruised in wine, and stomach plasters). She died three months later.

The other patient was described as “The Son of the Reverend Minister Steele.” He began to fast at the age of 16. Morton attributed his “want of appetite” to “studying too hard” as well as the “passions of his mind.” Morton was more successful with this patient, who followed the doctor's advice to abandon his studies and move to the country, take up riding and drink plenty of milk, whereupon he “recovered his health in great measure.”

=== 1770s: Timothy Dwight ===
In a biography of Noah Webster, a near-fatal case of anorexia was described of an instructor at Yale College:

Dwight considered employment the best antidote to melancholy, and he prided himself on studying fourteen hours a day and sleeping only four hours each night. A couple of years later, he suddenly became concerned that too much food was dulling his mind. He began to reduce his intake to twelve mouthfuls at each meal; after six months of this experiment, he upped the ante, cutting out all meat and eating only vegetables--primarily potatoes. By the summer of 1774, Dwight was down to ninety-five pounds, and his father whisked him home to Northampton, Massachusetts, where he was expected to die. But under doctor's orders to avoid all study and to drink a bottle of Madeira per day, Dwight slowly regained his health over the next few months.

=== 1790: Robert Willan’s case description ===
Robert Willan was an English physician in London who is credited with founding dermatology as a medical speciality. He is one of the first to describe the symptoms of extreme weight loss in males, in his paper “A Remarkable Case of Abstinence,” published in Medical Communications in 1790. This describes the case of a young Englishman who died in 1786 after fasting for 78 days. He wrote:

The duration of this young gentleman's fast is, I believe, longer than any recorded in the annals of Physic.

== 19th Century descriptions ==
=== 1859: Louis-Victor Marcé’s case descriptions ===
Louis-Victor Marcé (1828–1864), a French physician in Paris, published a number of case studies describing psychiatric disorders of women during and following pregnancy. His case descriptions included that of a patient displaying the symptoms of anorexia nervosa in 1859. In 1860, Marcé wrote:

I would venture to say that the first physicians who attended the patients misunderstood the true significance of this obstinate refusal of food and The hypochondriacal delirium, then, cannot be advantageously encountered so long as the subjects remain in the midst of their own family and their habitual circle.… It is therefore, indispensable to change the habitation and surrounding circumstances, and to entrust the patients to the care of strangers.

=== 1868: William Gull (address to the British Medical Association) ===
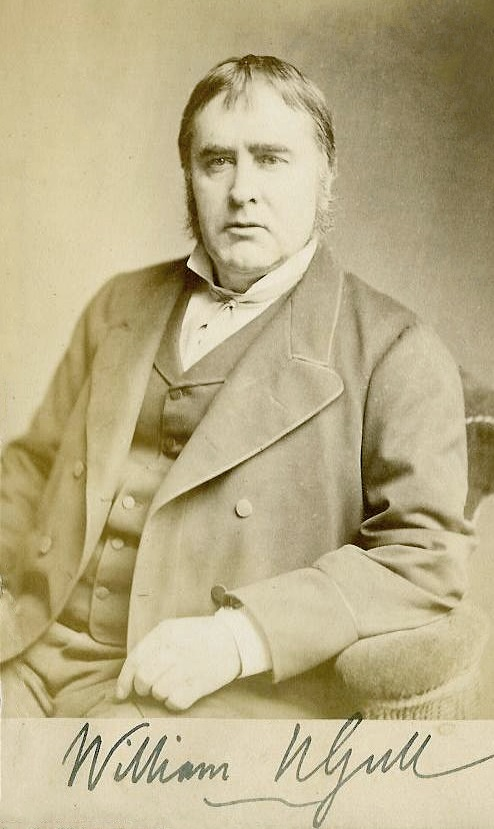
Sir William Gull, who wrote the seminal work and coined the term anorexia nervosa

In 1868, William Gull was a leading British physician living in London. That year, he described his observations of an emaciated condition in young women in an address to the British Medical Association (BMA) in Oxford. He observed that the causes of the condition were unknown, but that the subjects affected were "mostly of the female sex, and chiefly between the ages of sixteen and twenty three" although he also qualified this statement by adding that he had occasionally seen it in males of the same age.

The Lancet (the BMA's in-house journal) published the following extract from Gull's address:

At present our diagnosis is mostly one of inference, from our knowledge of the liability of the several organs to particular lesions; thus we avoid the error of supposing the presence of mesenteric disease in young women emaciated to the last degree through hysteric apepsia, by our knowledge of the latter affection, and by the absence of tubercular disease elsewhere.

=== 1873: Sir William Gull’s "Anorexia Nervosa" paper ===
By 1873, Sir William Gull had been made a Baronet and was one of four Physicians-in-Ordinary to Queen Victoria. In that year, he published his seminal work “Anorexia Nervosa (Apepsia Hysterica, Anorexia Hysterica)", in which he describes the three cases of Miss A, Miss B, and a third unnamed case. In 1887, he also recorded the case of Miss K, in what was to be the last of his medical papers to be published.

Sir William Gull writes that Miss A was referred to him on 17 January 1866. She was aged 17 and was greatly emaciated, having lost 33 pounds. Her weight at this time was 5 stone 12 pounds (82 pounds/37kgs); her height was 5 ft 5 inches /167 cm (body mass index of 13.5). Gull records that most of her physical condition was normal, with healthy respiration, heart sounds and pulse; no vomiting nor diarrhoea; clean tongue and normal urine. The condition was that of simple starvation, with total refusal of animal food and almost total refusal of everything else.

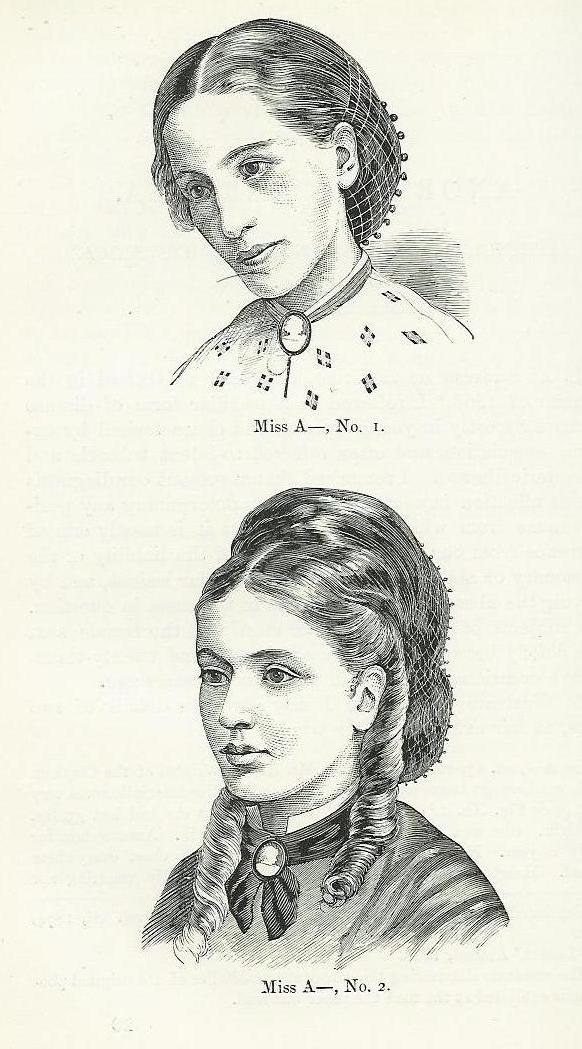
Miss A, pictured in 1866 aged 17 (No. 1) and in 1870 aged 21 (No. 2). From the published medical papers of Sir William Gull

Gull prescribed various remedies (including preparations of cinchona, biochloride of mercury, syrup of iodide of iron, syrup of phosphate of iron, citrate of quinine) and variations in diet without noticeable success. He noted occasional voracious appetite for very brief periods, but states that these were very rare and exceptional. He also records that she was frequently restless and active and notes that this was a "striking expression of the nervous state, for it seemed hardly possible that a body so wasted could undergo the exercise which seemed agreeable".

In Gull's published medical papers, images of Miss A are shown that depict her appearance before and after treatment (right). Gull notes her aged appearance at age 17:

It will be noticeable that as she recovered she had a much younger look, corresponding indeed to her age, twenty-one; whilst the photographs, taken when she was seventeen, give her the appearance of being nearer thirty.

Miss A remained under Gull's observation from January 1866 to March 1868, by which time she seemed to have made a full recovery, having gained in weight from 82 lbs/37 kg to 128 lbs/58 kg.

Miss B was referred to Gull on 8 October 1868, aged 18, as a case of suspected tuberculosis. Gull noted that her emaciated appearance was more extreme than normally occurs in tubercular cases. His physical examination of her chest and abdomen discovered nothing abnormal, but he recorded a "peculiar restlessness" that was difficult to control. The mother advised that "She is never tired". Gull was struck by the similarity of the case to that of Miss A, even to the detail of the pulse and respiration observations.

Miss B was treated by Gull until 1872, by which time a noticeable recovery was underway and eventually complete. Gull admits in his medical papers that the medical treatment probably did not contribute much to the recovery, consisting, as in the former case, of various tonics and a nourishing diet.

Although the cases of Miss A and Miss B resulted in recovery, Gull states that he observed at least one fatality as a result of anorexia nervosa. He states that the post mortem revealed no physical abnormalities other than thrombosis of the femoral veins. Death appeared to have resulted from starvation alone.

=== 1873: Ernest-Charles Lasègue ===
Ernest-Charles Lasègue was a French physician who practised at the Salpêtrière, Pitié and Necker hospitals. From 1869, he was a professor of clinical medicine at Hôpital Necker.

In 1873, Lasègue published a paper entitled "De l’Anorexie Histerique" in the Archives générales de Médecin. Later that year, a translated version of the paper was published in the British Medical Times.

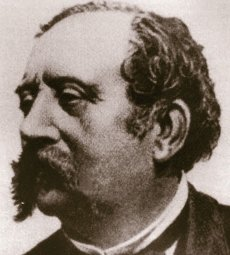
Ernest-Charles Lasègue, who named the condition L’Anorexie Histerique

Lasègue began the article by noting the importance of recognizing hysterical anorexia as a diagnostic entity, and then described the progression of the illness. He proposed the hypothesis that at the onset of the disease, lack of appetite originates from a wish to avoid pain. After this, a passage was deleted from the translation which described 'the paradoxical liveliness' of the anorexic. Lasègue contrasted anorexic behaviour to the behaviour of people forced into starvation during the great famine in Paris. Lasegue then described the downward spiral of the anorexic, characterized by indifference, disgust, aversion, and eventually starvation, ill health and possible death.

Lasègue's paper contrasts with Gull's work by its focus on the psychological symptoms and examination of the role of parental influences and family interactions. He wrote about some of the family dynamics inherent in anorexic families, and provided a detailed description of a scene in which relatives try to persuade an anorexic to eat. This detailed description listed three stages of Anorexia nervosa, with stage 2 including distressed families speaking "mournfully...of the girl's food" and the patient being "surrounded by a kind of atmosphere from which there was no escape,"which resulted in the anorexic girl developing a kind of "pathological contentment" with the situation she was in. And stage 3 including a physical deterioration in which a sufferer has a decision to make: "she either is so yielding as to become obedient without restriction, which is rare; or she submits with a semi-docility... which... vastly complicates the situation."

Lasègue emphasized the family's role in the onset of AN. He said "It must not cause surprise to find me thus always placing in parallel the morbid condition of the hysterical subject and the preoccupations of those around her. These two circumstances are intimately connected" He suggested that this connection manifested itself as a conflict between a maturing girl and her parents, often due to the prolongation of dependency that occurred in upper-class 19th-century families, in which a woman was waiting to be married and thus wasn't working and completely reliant on her parents. Lasègue also identified "emotional causes" that were often connected to "some real or imaginary marriage proposal," further highlighting the link between anorexia and the frustrations one goes through in the female transition to adulthood.

In an addendum to his Anorexia Nervosa paper, Sir William Gull provides the following comment on Lasègue's work:

It is plain that Dr. Lasègue and I have the same malady in mind, though the form of our illustrations are different. Dr. Lasègue does not refer to my address at Oxford, and it is most likely he knew nothing of it. There is, therefore, the more value in his paper, as our observations have been made independently. We have both chosen the same expression to characterise the malady. In the address at Oxford I used the term Apepsia hysterica, but before seeing Dr. Lasègue's paper, it had equally occurred to me that Anorexia would be more correct.

== Recent history ==
Although the medical facts of anorexia nervosa have been documented since the 1870s, public awareness of the condition was limited until the second half of the 20th century. The concept of obsession with body image as a motivating factor for excessive fasting did not emerge until the mid-1960s, it becoming a criterion in 1970, but it was not until 1980 that body image disturbance was formally included as a diagnostic criterion in the Diagnostic and Statistical Manual of Mental Disorders published by the American Psychiatric Association. More recently, with progress in the field of neuroscience researchers have increasingly looked at anorexia as a biologically-based mental disorder, like schizophrenia.

=== Hilde Bruch research and publications ===
Hilde Bruch (March 11, 1904 – December 15, 1984) was a German-born American psychoanalyst, who practised at Baylor College of Medicine, Houston in the United States. Her early career focussed on obesity; but from the early 1960s she increasingly turned her attention to anorexia nervosa and its underlying causes. Bruch's 1973 work Eating Disorders: Obesity, Anorexia Nervosa, and the Person Within is considered a seminal work on the subject and was the first of several works that documented her work with anorexic subjects.

Her best known work is The Golden Cage: the Enigma of Anorexia Nervosa, published in 1978. This book drew on material in Eating Disorders in a publication aimed at a lay readership. It sold 150,000 copies and is recognized as one of the earliest publications that created a wider awareness of anorexia nervosa beyond the medical profession.

=== Death of Karen Carpenter ===
Karen Carpenter was a popular American vocal and drummer musician. Her death on February 4, 1983, was attributed to heart failure as a consequence of anorexia nervosa.

Awareness of anorexia nervosa and other eating disorders was transformed by Carpenter's death. Her young age (32) coupled with her fame as an entertainer captured public attention and received extensive media coverage. The sympathetic reporting of her illness prompted other celebrities, such as Jane Fonda and Lynn Redgrave, to come forward and share their experiences.

Karen Carpenter's brother and singing partner, Richard Carpenter, established a fund dedicated to his sister's memory for research into anorexia nervosa.

== See also ==
- List of deaths from anorexia nervosa
- Anorexia mirabilis
- Fasting girl
