= Luis Ramos (Uruguayan footballer) =

Uruguayan footballer (1939-2021)

Personal information
- Full name: Luis Eduardo Ramos de Lucía
- Date of birth: 9 October 1939
- Place of birth: Montevideo, Uruguay
- Date of death: 14 March 2021 (aged 81)
- Place of death: Montevideo, Uruguay
- Position: Defender

Senior career*
| Years | Team | Apps | (Gls) |
- Club Nacional de Football
| 1967–1968 | Deportivo Español | 16 | (0) |
| 1972–1973 | Estudiantes de Merida | | |

International career
- Uruguay
- * Club domestic league appearances and goals

Luis Eduardo Ramos de Lucía (9 October 1939 – 14 March 2021) was a Uruguayan football defender who played for Uruguay in the 1966 FIFA World Cup. He also played for Club Nacional de Football. In Argentina, he played for Deportivo Español in 1967–68.

His daughters Luisel and Eliana, both models, died within months of each other from causes related to anorexia nervosa.

Luis Ramos died from COVID-19 on 14 March 2021, at the age of 81.
