= Lene Marie Fossen =

Norwegian photographer (1986–2019)

Lene Marie Fossen (18 August 1986 - 22 October 2019) was a Norwegian photographer and artist.

== Personal life and photography ==
Lene Marie Fossen had Anorexia nervosa since age 10, stating she started to starve in order to prevent growing up.

She started learning photography as a teenager. The main focus of her work was black-and-white portraits of people. A 2017 exhibition of her self portraits depicting the effects of her struggle with anorexia, gained significant attention in Norway. In interviews, and in a TED talk, she described her struggle between creativity and suffering from poor physical health.

She worked on a documentary about her life while taking portrait photos of Syrian refugee children in Greece in 2019. During this work, she suffered a car accident that caused her additional health issues. She died from the long term effects of her illness, aged 33. The documentary was aired after her death.

Further exhibitions of her photography art were presented in 2022. She weighed 25 kg when she died.
