= Isabelle Caro =

French actress and model (1982–2010)

Isabelle Caro Rosei
- Born: Isabelle Caro Rosei; 12 September 1982; Aubergenville, France
- Died: 18 November 2010 (aged 28); Paris, France
- Occupations: Model; actress
- Years active: 2001–2010
- Modeling information
- Height: 156 cm (5 ft 1 in)
- Hair color: Red
- Eye color: Blue

Isabelle Caro Rosenbohm (12 September 1982 – 18 November 2010) was a French model and actress from Marseille, France, who became well known after appearing in a controversial advertising campaign "No Anorexia" which showed Caro with vertebrae and facial bones showing under her skin in a picture by photographer Oliviero Toscani.

== Biography ==
Caro had severe anorexia nervosa from the age of 13. Her anorexia was caused by what she called a "troubled childhood".

I had a very complicated childhood, very difficult, very painful. My mother's big phobia was that I would grow. She spent her time measuring my height. She wouldn't let me go outside because she'd heard that fresh air makes children grow, and that's why I was kept at home. It was completely traumatic.

When she appeared on CBS's The Insider, it was revealed that at the worst of her eating disorder, she weighed only 25 kilograms (55 lb; 3 st 13 lb) at a height of 1.65 metres (5 ft 5 in); while at the time of filming her weight was 33 kilograms (73 lb; 5 st 3 lb).

She appeared on Channel 4's Supersize vs Superskinny which aired on 11 March 2008 in the UK, in which she spoke to journalist Anna Richardson about her anorexia.

Caro was hospitalized for the first time when she was 20. In 2006, she slipped into a coma, having hit her lowest-recorded weight, 25 kg (55 lb).

Caro was interviewed in the second episode of the TV documentary series, The Price of Beauty, in which Jessica Simpson and her two best friends, Ken Pavés and CaCee Cobb, traveled the world to explore the meaning of true beauty. Simpson investigated the problem of how some female fashion models have become obsessed with being skinny. Caro talked about how she became anorexic and warned other girls about anorexia. Simpson was moved to say "What you are doing right now makes you more beautiful and I hope women all over the world hear about the story and it is important to know that how skinny you are does not make you beautiful." It aired on 22 March 2010 in the US and on 21 August in Japan.

Caro also appeared on National Geographic Channel's Taboo: Beauty. The show was filmed two months prior to her death.

== Death ==
Caro died on 18 November 2010 in France, after spending about two weeks in hospital with acute respiratory disease. The cause of her death is unknown, although it was probably as a result of immunodeficiency due to anorexia. Caro's acting instructor, Daniele Dubreuil-Prevot, told the Associated Press news agency that Caro had died "after returning to France" from a job in Tokyo, and that "she had been sick for a very long time" (in reference to her anorexia). Her family only reported Caro's death to the media a month afterward, on 29 December 2010. Caro died in Paris and is buried in the Cimetière du Montparnasse. On 18 January 2011, it was reported that Caro's mother, Marie, had died by suicide the previous week.

== See also ==
- History of anorexia nervosa
