= Heidi Guenther =

American ballerina (1975–1997)

- Born: Heidi Noelle Guenther; January 11, 1975; San Francisco
- Died: June 30, 1997 (aged 22)
- Cause of death: Cardiac arrest caused by an eating disorder
- Education: San Francisco Ballet School

Heidi Noelle Guenther (January 11, 1975 – June 30, 1997) was an American ballerina from 1981 to her death in 1997. Guenther died from cardiac arrest which was believed to be caused by her eating disorder.

== Biography ==
Guenther was born in San Francisco. She was raised in Los Osos, and trained at School of the American Ballet and Houston Ballet Academy during the summer. Guenther earned a full scholarship to the San Francisco Ballet School when she was twelve. She performed throughout high school and in 1994, performed in "Symphony in C" at the Kennedy Center.

She was first told to lose weight by the San Francisco Ballet School. In 1994 and in 1995, Artistic director Anna-Marie Holmes encouraged Guenther to lose weight, eventually going to 110 pounds. The weight loss did not stop here. Guenther continued to drop weight at an alarmingly quick rate. Guenther was soon promoted to the Boston Ballet in 1994 as an apprentice dancer. A colleague, Kyra Strasberg, called Guenther, "a very, very talented dancer with a gorgeous light jump."

Guenther broke her foot in the first season, as an apprentice. She did not seek medical attention, because she was afraid she would lose her contract. Instead she rested her foot when she wasn't dancing, causing her to gain five pounds. The Boston Ballet did urge her to not lose any more weight in an evaluation given in January 1997. At the time, the company was worried that she may have an eating disorder. Though the company noticed her weight loss they did not follow up with her about it. Boston Ballet did not address the issue that was an eating disorder. She was considered "dangerously thin" by the ballet's records. Holmes, however, told Guenther before she left for summer vacation starting in June 1995, that if she didn't lose the five pounds she gained, she would not gain a contract. Guenther wrote a note to herself for that summer vacation, renewing her commitment to lose weight, "They always pick people for parts who are skinny." While the Boston Ballet did counsel her to gain weight, Guenther's mother noticed that the thinner her daughter was, the more dancing roles she was given. This added to the pressure already placed on Heidi to lose weight.

During a family trip to Disneyland, Guenther died on June 30, 1997, of cardiac arrest at the age of 22. There was not an event that led up to her death. Heidi was sitting in the back seat of a vehicle when all of a sudden she was no longer breathing. Her death was speculated to be caused by her immense amount of weight loss.

In a later search, a stash of laxatives and herbal diet-aid pills were found in her possession. Along with the use of medication to lose weight, many of Heidi's friends stated that she had an unhealthy relationship with purging, as well as skipping meals. An autopsy showed no heart deformities and no abnormal substances in her blood. However, her heart wall was found to be abnormally thin. A week before her death, she told her family that her heart was "racing" and "pounding," but she would not seek medical attention.

Her family filed a wrongful death suit in 2000, against the Boston Ballet, for putting excessive pressure on Guenther to lose weight. Holmes was also named as a defendant in the suit, which was filed just before the statute of limitations expired. The suit was later rejected by the courts.

== Legacy ==
Guenther's death "was a wake-up call for everyone," causing ballet companies to treat eating disorders as a "top priority." Immediately after her death, some American ballet companies said they would change their policies or offer extra information about eating disorders. Her death caused the Boston Ballet to begin nutrition counseling, onsite therapists, wellness seminars and help with weight control. Her family is attempting to start a foundation to help young athletes and dancers in honor of Guenther.
