= Richard Morton (physician) =

English physician

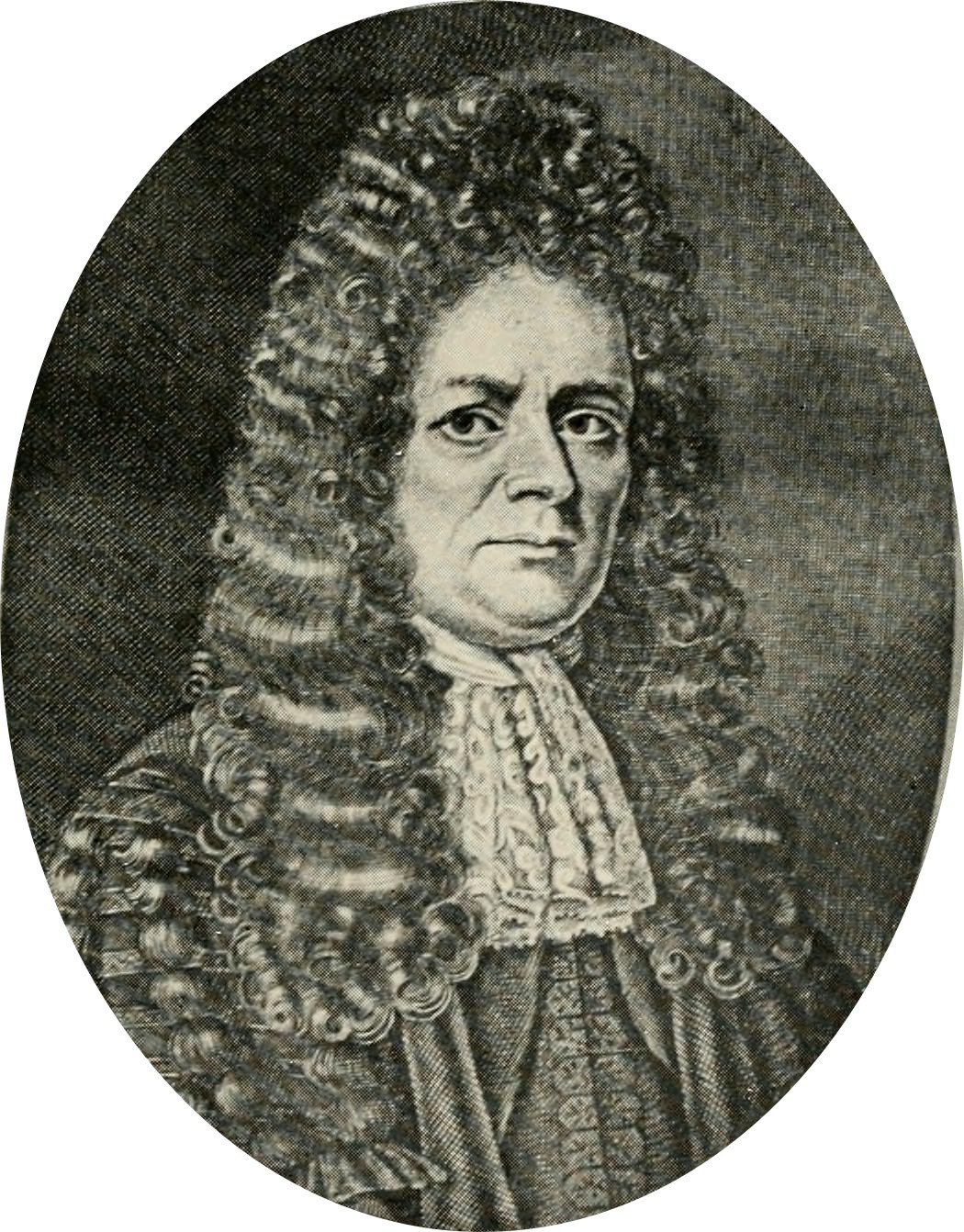
Richard Morton

Richard Morton (30 July 1637 – 30 August 1698) was an English physician who was the first to state that tubercles were always present in the tuberculosis disease of the lungs. In Morton's time, this wasting disease was termed consumption, or by its Greek name of phthisis. Recognition of the many possible symptoms of this infection belonging to a single disease was not until the 1820s and it was J.L. Schönlein in 1839 who introduced the term "tuberculosis".

== Life ==
=== Clerical career ===
He was born in Worcestershire, England and, having trained at Oxford's Magdalen Hall, decided to enter the Church, becoming Vicar of Kinver in Staffordshire. He was also appointed chaplain of New College.

With his refusal to acquiesce to the Act of Uniformity 1662 following the Restoration of Charles II, he was forced to resign.

=== Medical career ===
His whereabouts for the following eight years are unclear, although he probably travelled to Holland. Returning to England in 1670, he was awarded doctorate of medicine by Oxford University; he became a Fellow of the Royal College of Physicians in 1678.

He was appointed as physician-in-ordinary to King William III of England.

== Works ==
His landmark paper Phthisiologia, seu exercitationes de phthisi, tribus libris comprehensæ. Totumque opus variis historiis illustratum was published in Latin in 1689. An English translation appeared in 1694, with a second English edition appearing in 1694. A second English edition was published in 1720. Its significance is partly due to the disease receiving little study by other doctors of the time despite it being a major cause of death; accounting for over 18% all deaths in the City of London in 1700.

In 1692 he also published Pyretologia, seu Exercitationes de Morbis Universalibus Acutis and Pyretologiæ Pars altera, sive Exercitatio de Febribus inflammatoriis universalibus.

Medicine of that time was deferential to the ideas of Galen and so Morton understandably mistook tubercles for being caused by glandular degenerations; mycobacterium tuberculosis not being identified until 1882 by Robert Koch.

He also wrote a paper on ‘nervous consumption’, which contains the first recognised medical descriptions of the wasting condition now known as anorexia nervosa.

== Family ==
Morton was married with one daughter.
