= Luisel Ramos =

Uruguayan model (1984–2006)

- Born: April 12, 1984; Montevideo, Uruguay
- Died: August 2, 2006 (aged 22); Montevideo, Uruguay
- Cause of death: Heart failure caused by anorexia nervosa
- Occupation: Model
- Parent: Luis Ramos (father)
- Relatives: Eliana Ramos (sister)
- Modeling information
- Height: 5 ft 9 in (175 cm)
- Hair color: Dark Blonde
- Eye color: Blue/Green

Luisel Ramos Arregui (April 12, 1984 – August 2, 2006) was a Uruguayan model.

== Biography ==
=== Early life ===
Ramos was born in La Unión, a middle-class neighborhood in Montevideo, the daughter of former footballer Luis Ramos, who played for the Uruguay national team at the 1966 FIFA World Cup in England and Elsa Arregui, an athlete and gym teacher. Her sister Eliana Ramos was also a model.

=== Death ===
On August 2, 2006, at 9:15 p.m., Ramos died of heart failure caused by anorexia nervosa while participating in a fashion show during the Montevideo Fashion Week. Ramos had felt ill after walking the runway and subsequently collapsed unconscious on her way back to the dressing room. She died at the age of 22. Ramos' father told police that she had gone "several days" without eating. She was reported to have adopted a diet of lettuce and Diet Coke for the three months before her death. Her remains are buried at Cementerio del Buceo, Montevideo.

In the wake of Ramos' death, the Madrid Fashion Week (held in September 2006) set a minimum BMI of 18 for all models. In December 2006, fashion designers with shows in Milan issued a code of conduct that required all models to have a BMI of at least 18.5 and be at least 16 years old, and also banned the use of makeup to create dark circles under the eyes to mimic effects of anorexia.

On February 13, 2007, Luisel's 18-year-old sister Eliana Ramos, also a model, died at her grandparents' home in Montevideo of an apparent heart attack, believed to be related to malnutrition and was buried near her sister.

== See also ==
- List of deaths from anorexia nervosa
