= List of people from Harlem =

This is a list of people from Harlem in New York City.

== The early period (pre-1920) ==
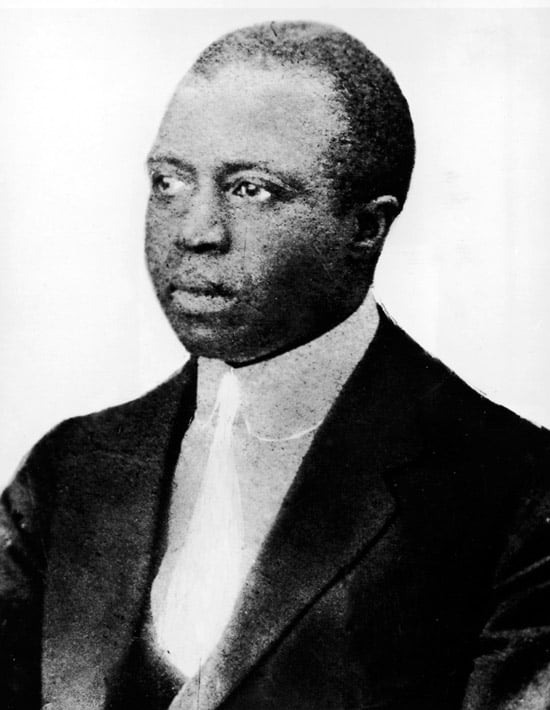
Scott Joplin

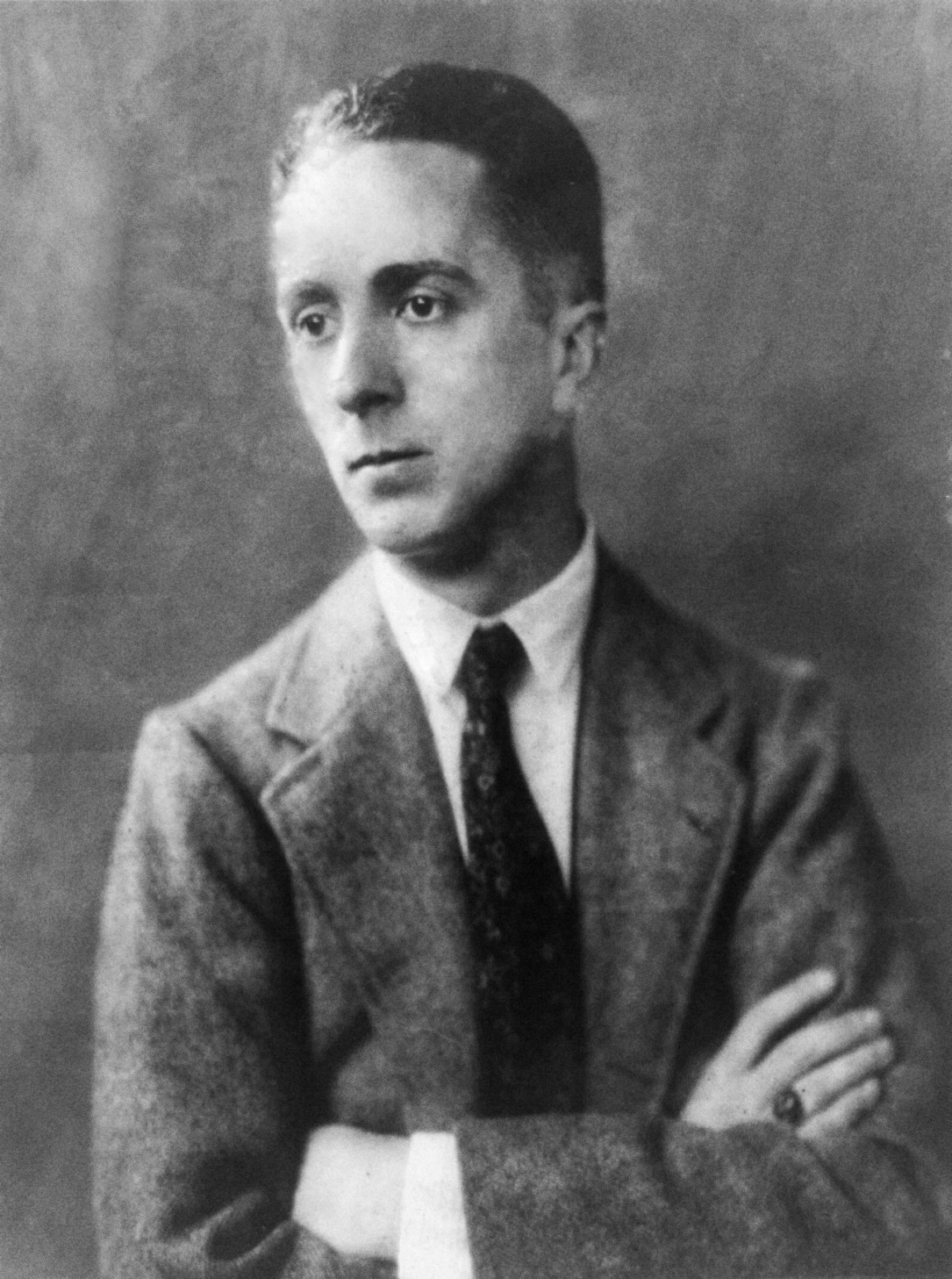
Norman Rockwell

- John James Audubon – naturalist, artist, entrepreneur, explorer, and ornithologist
- Richard Croker – Tammany Hall politician, lived at 26 Mount Morris Park West
- James Reese Europe – ragtime and early jazz bandleader, arranger, and composer, credited with inventing jazz; 67 West 133rd Street
- Thomas Gilroy – New York City mayor
- Alexander Hamilton – politician; 1st United States Secretary of the Treasury; lived at 414 West 141st Street in Harlem at the end of his life
- Hubert Harrison – "The Father of Harlem Radicalism"
- Scott Joplin – ragtime pianist and composer; lived at 133 West 138th Street in 1916, then at 163 West 131st Street until his death in 1917; had a studio at 160 West 133rd Street
- Vincent James McMahon – founder of the World Wide Wrestling Federation
- Paul Meltsner – WPA era painter and muralist; grew up in Harlem
- Thomas Nast – artist, lived at 24 West 125th Street.
- Philip A. Payton Jr. – real estate entrepreneur; lived at 13 West 131st Street
- Norman Rockwell – painter and illustrator; lived as a child at 789 St. Nicholas Avenue
- Norman Thomas – radical activist
- Daniel Tiemann – New York mayor; lived at 607 West 127th Street.
- Robert Van Wyck – New York mayor
- Cornelius Van Wyck Lawrence – New York mayor

== Jewish, Italian, Irish and Spanish Harlem (circa 1900–30) ==
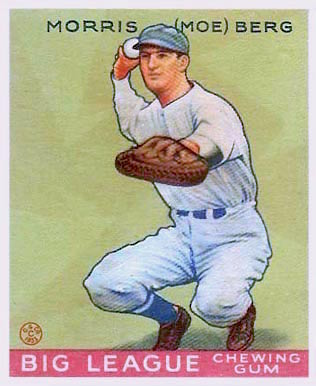
Moe Berg

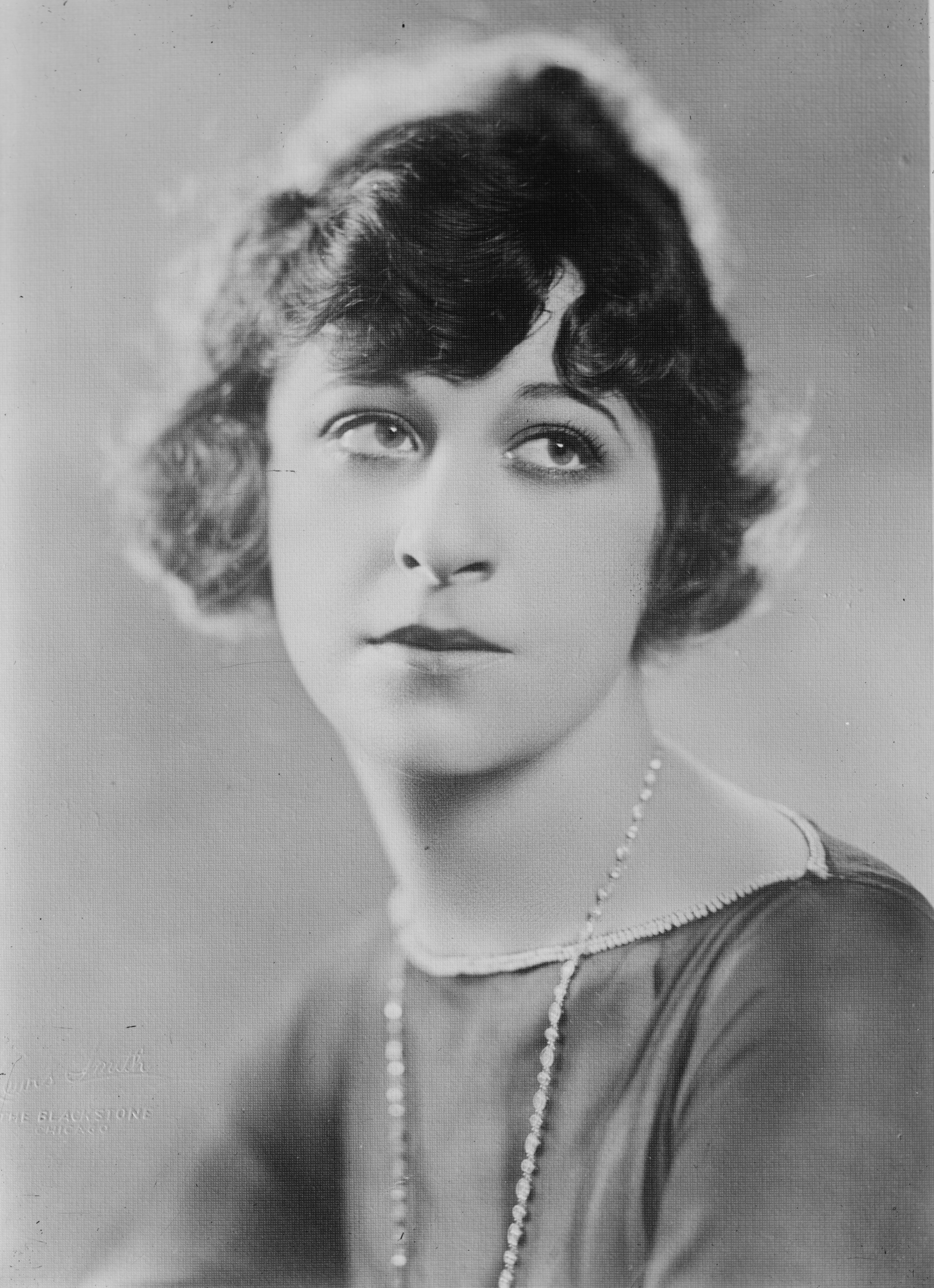
Fanny Brice

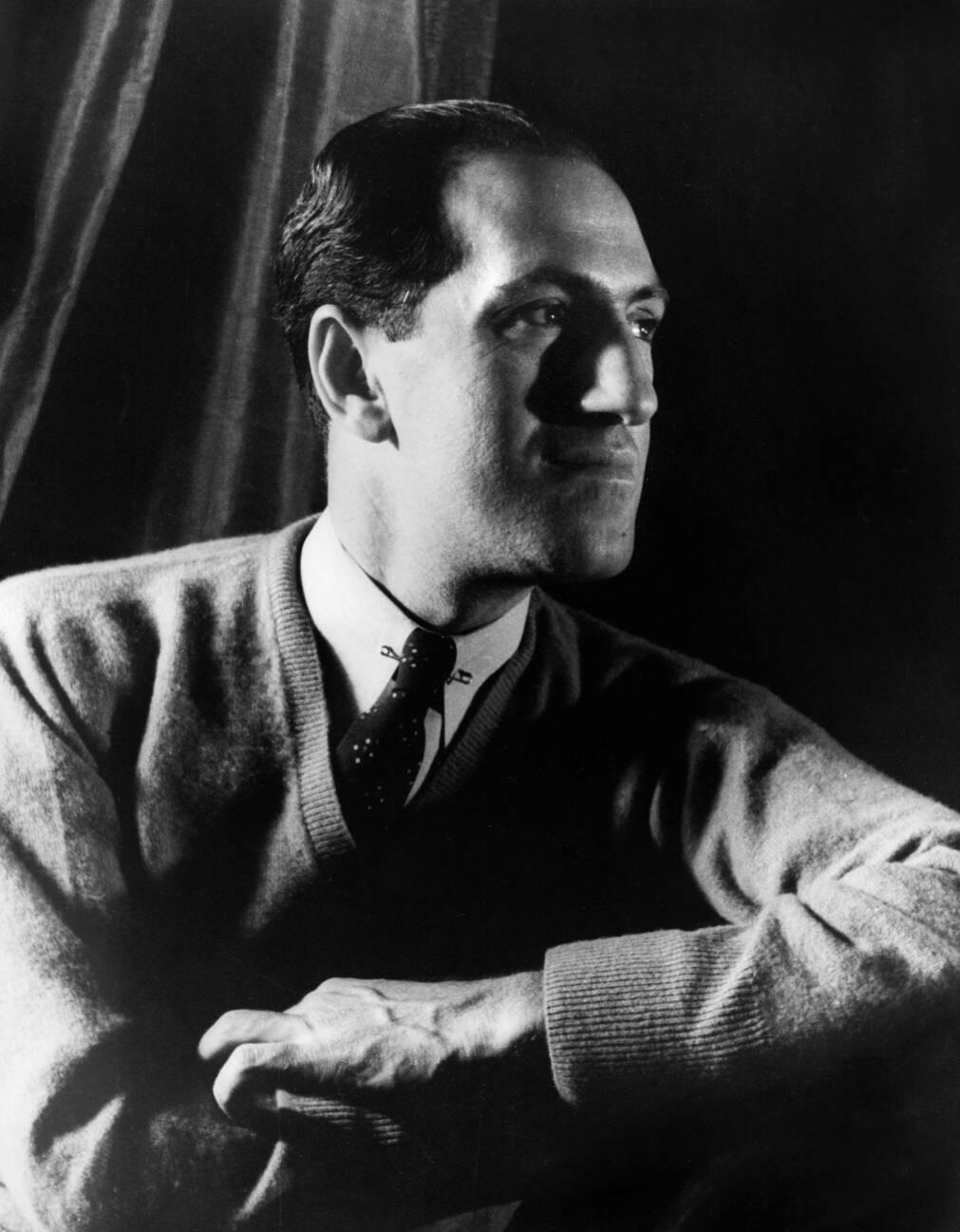
George Gershwin

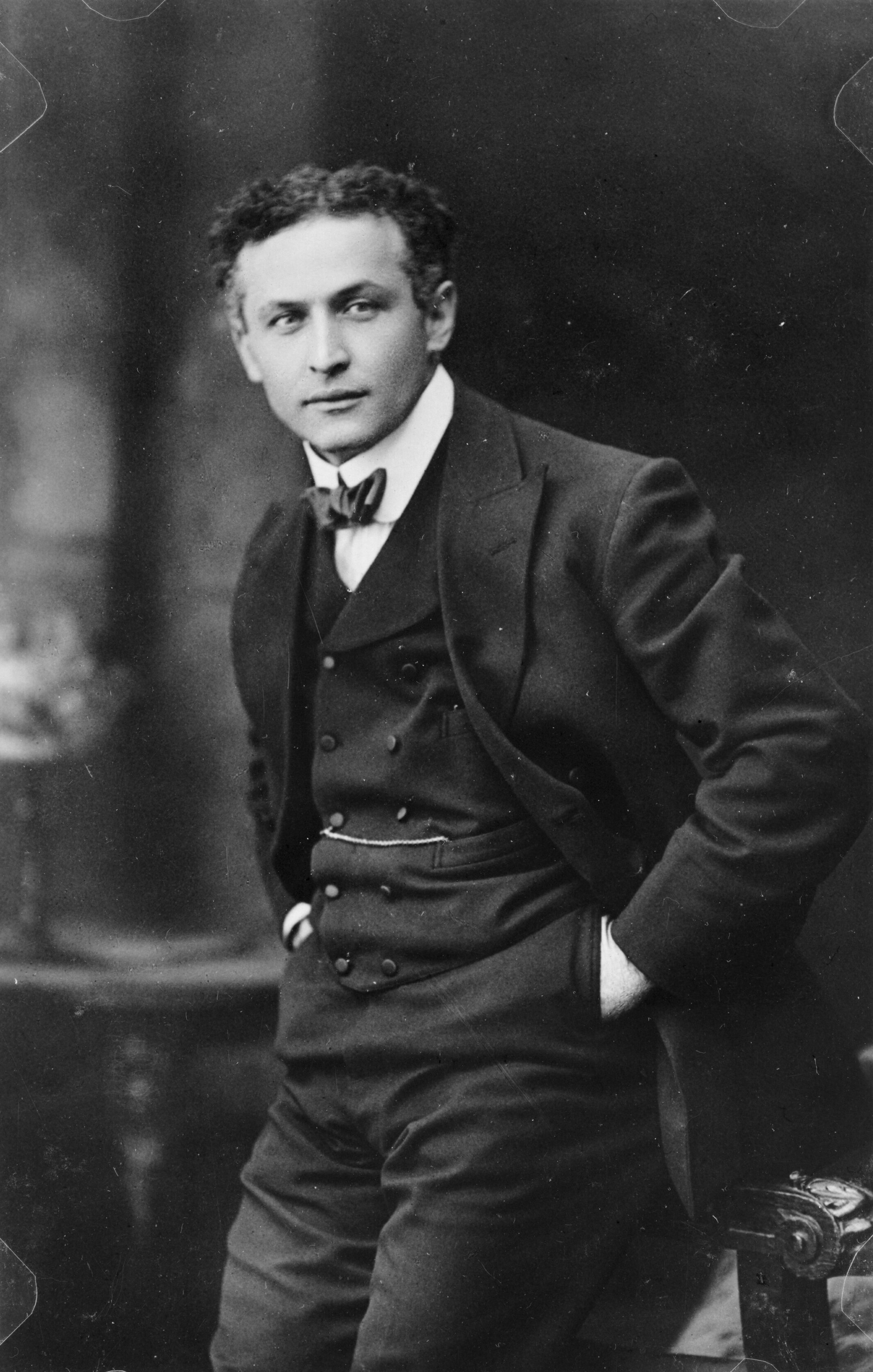
Harry Houdini

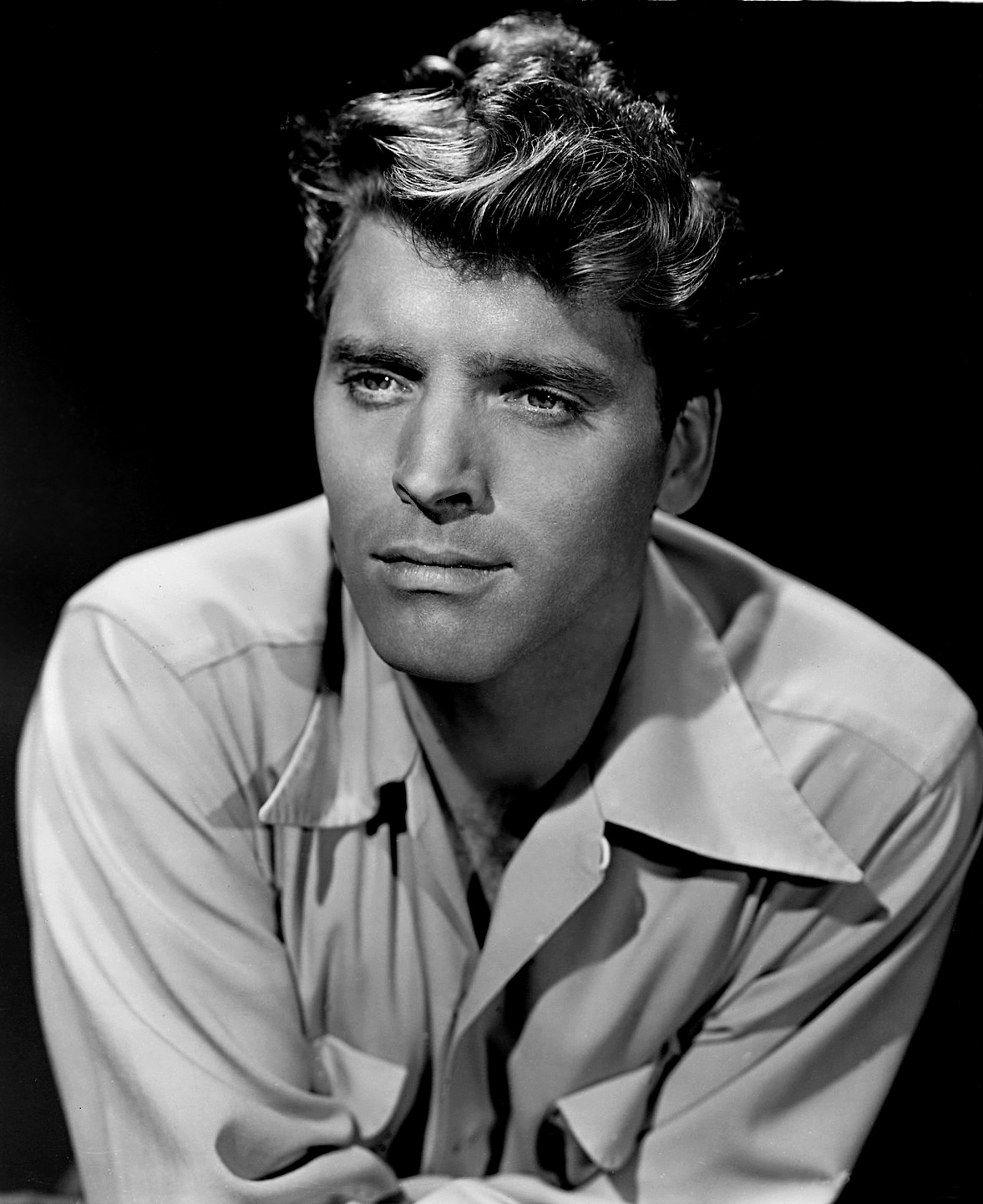
Burt Lancaster

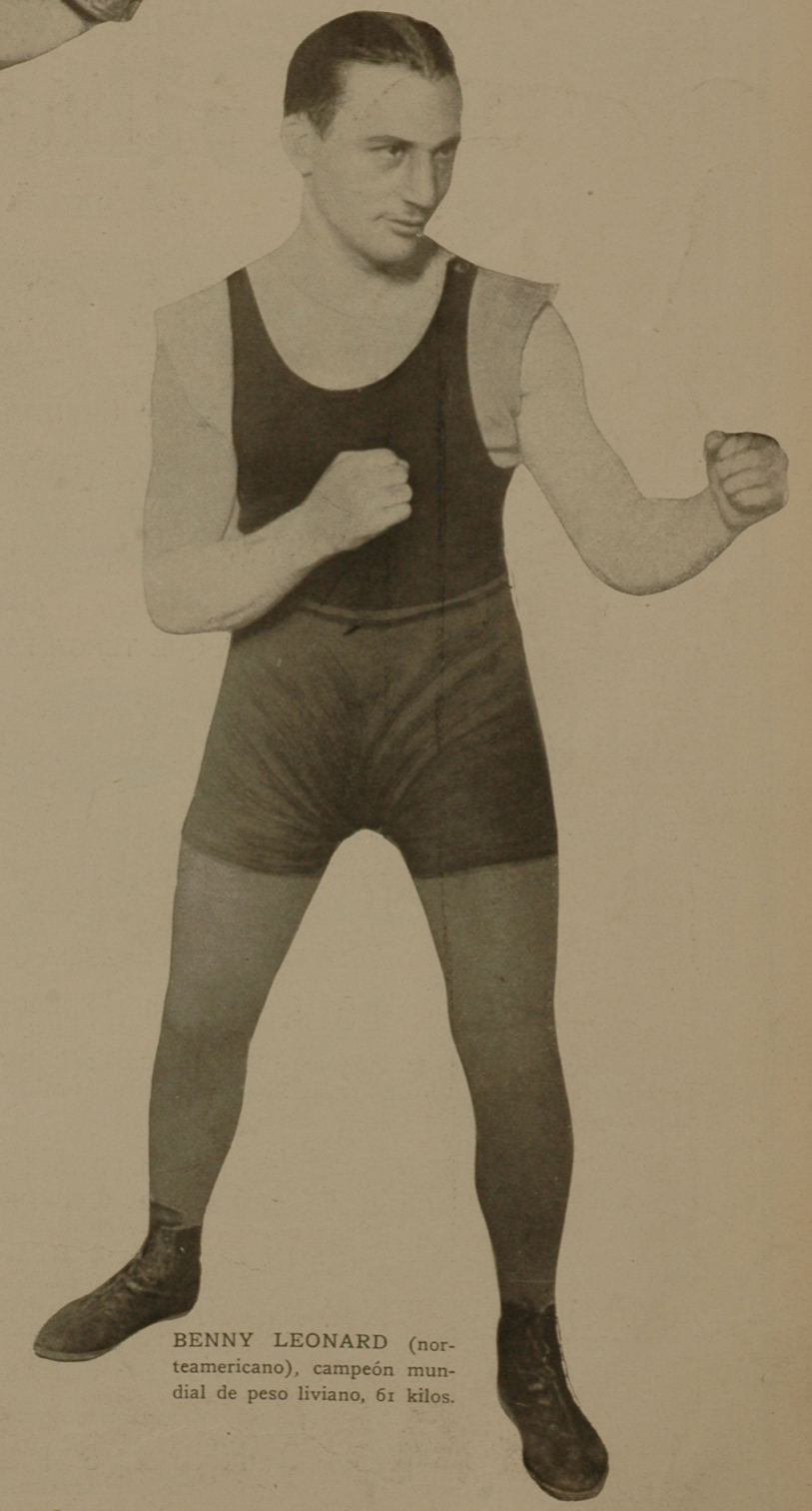
Benny Leonard, world lightweight champion.

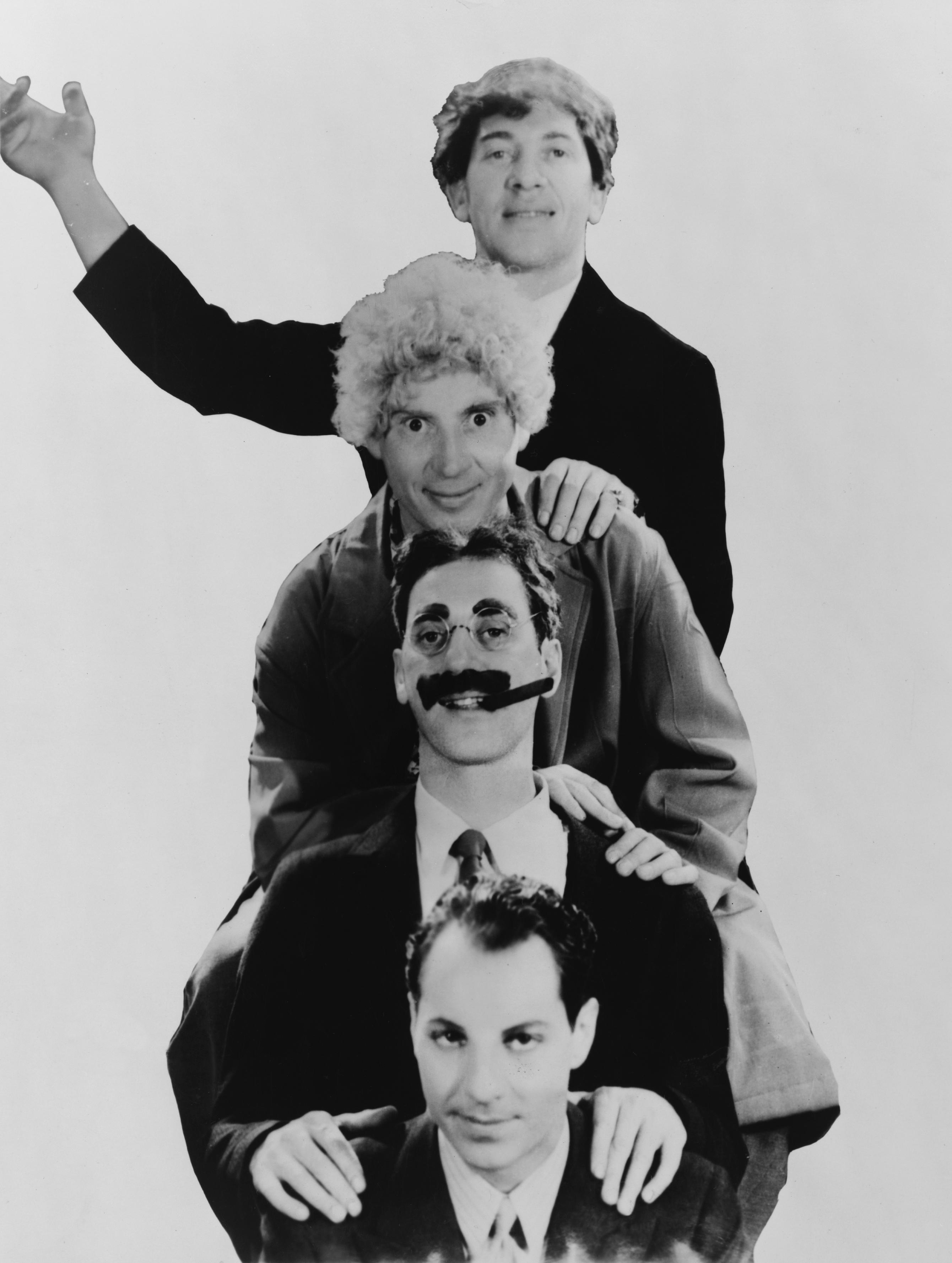
The Marx Brothers

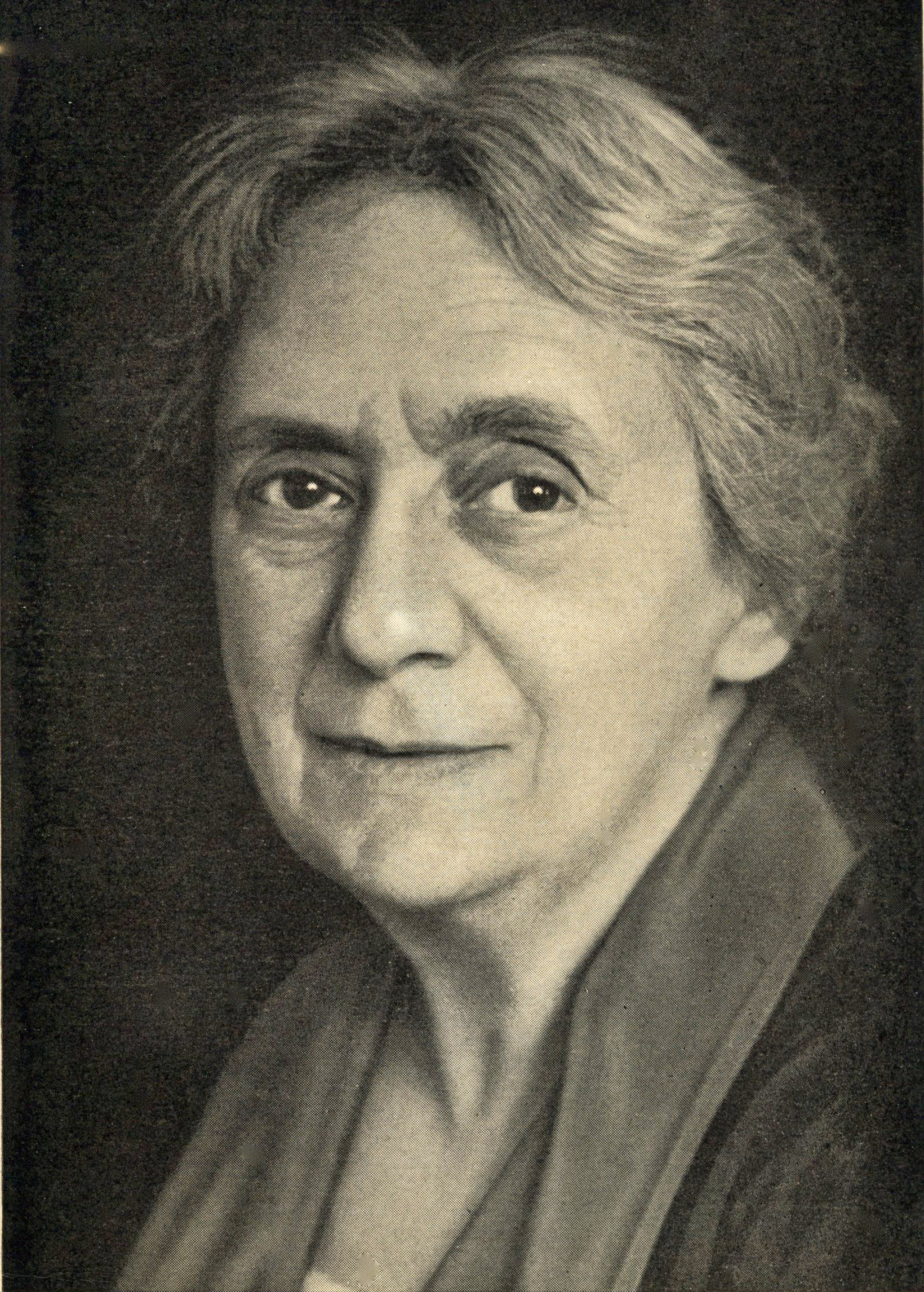
Henrietta Szold

- Sholem Aleichem – author and playwright, 110 Lenox Avenue
- Moe Berg (1902–1972) – Major League Baseball catcher; spy; lived on 121st Street.
- Milton Berle – comedian and actor, born in a five-story walkup at 68 West 118th Street
- Fanny Brice – actress, comedian, and singer; houses at West 128th Street and West 118th Street
- Art Buchwald – humorist and writer
- Bennett Cerf – publisher and writer, born on May 25, 1898, at 68 West 118th Street, the same address as Milton Berle's
- Milt Gabler – record producer, responsible for many innovations in the recording industry of the 20th century
- George and Ira Gershwin – jazz, popular, and classical music composers, grew up in Harlem; lived at 108 West 111th and other addresses. George wrote his first hit song, "Swanee", at his home at 520 W. 144 Street in 1919. The pair were living at 501 Cathedral Parkway in 1924, and it was in this apartment that George wrote "Rhapsody in Blue."
- Abe Goldstein (the "Pride of the Ghetto") – boxer, world bantamweight champion
- Oscar Hammerstein I – inventor, composer, and theatrical entrepreneur; lived at 333 Edgecombe Avenue
- Oscar Hammerstein II – writer, lyricist, librettist, theatrical producer, and director in musical theater; addresses on East 116th Street and 112th Street
- Lorenz Hart – lyricist; half of the Broadway songwriting team Rodgers and Hart, 59 West 119th Street
- Harry Houdini – magician, escapologist, illusionist, and stunt performer; lived at 278 West 113th Street from 1904 until his death in 1926
- Frank Hussey – Olympic sprinter and gold medalist; 129th Street
- Burt Lancaster – Oscar-winning actor and producer; 209 East 106th Street.
- Benny Leonard (born Benjamin Leiner) – boxer, world lightweight title from 1917 to 1925, International Boxing Hall of Fame
- Seymour Martin Lipset – political sociologist and political scientist, senior fellow at the Hoover Institution at Stanford University, and Hazel Professor of Public Policy at George Mason University
- Ignazio Lupo – counterfeiter, gangster
- Marx Brothers – comedians, 239 East 114th Street
- Arthur Miller – playwright and essayist; 45 West 110th Street
- Giuseppe Morello – gangster, 323 East 107th Street
- Belle Moskowitz – political advisor to New York Governor and 1928 presidential candidate Al Smith
- Al Pacino – Academy Award and Tony Award-winning actor
- Charlie Pilkington (the Meriden Flash) – three-time New York champion boxer; East 102nd Street
- David Rappaport – fashion manufacturer, designer, and painter
- Richard Rodgers – composer, 3 West 120th Street
- Yossele Rosenblatt – cantor and composer
- Henry Roth – novelist and short story writer, 108 East 119th Street
- Jessie Sampter – poet
- John Sanford, born Julian Lawrence Shapiro – screenwriter and author who wrote 24 books
- Ed Sullivan – Broadway and sports columnist, television host of the long-running televised Sunday evening variety show; East 114th Street
- Arthur Sulzberger – publisher of The New York Times
- Henrietta Szold – founder of Hadassah
- Vincent and Ciro Terranova – gangsters, 352 East 116th Street

== The Harlem Renaissance and World War II (1920–1945) ==
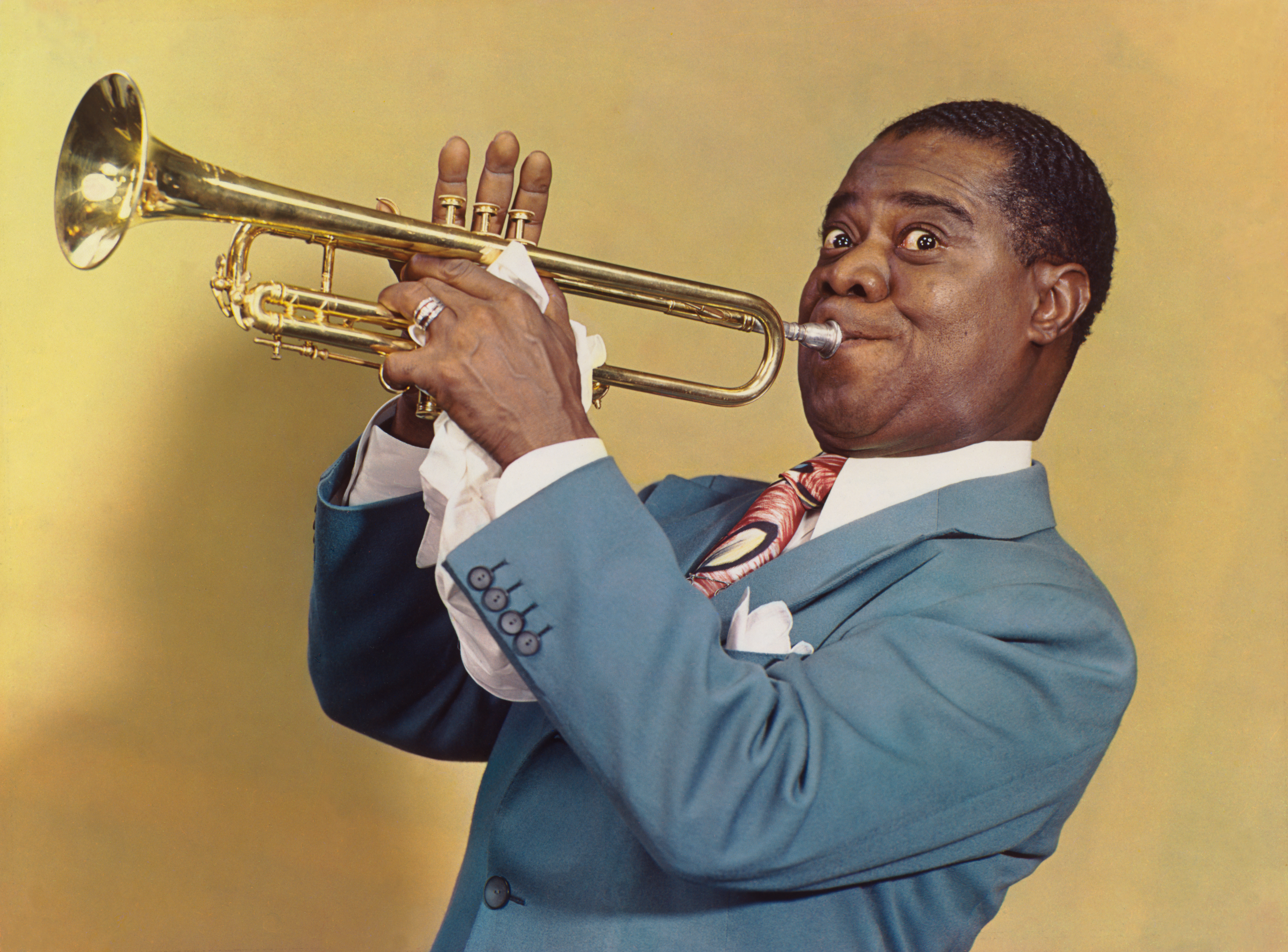
Louis Armstrong

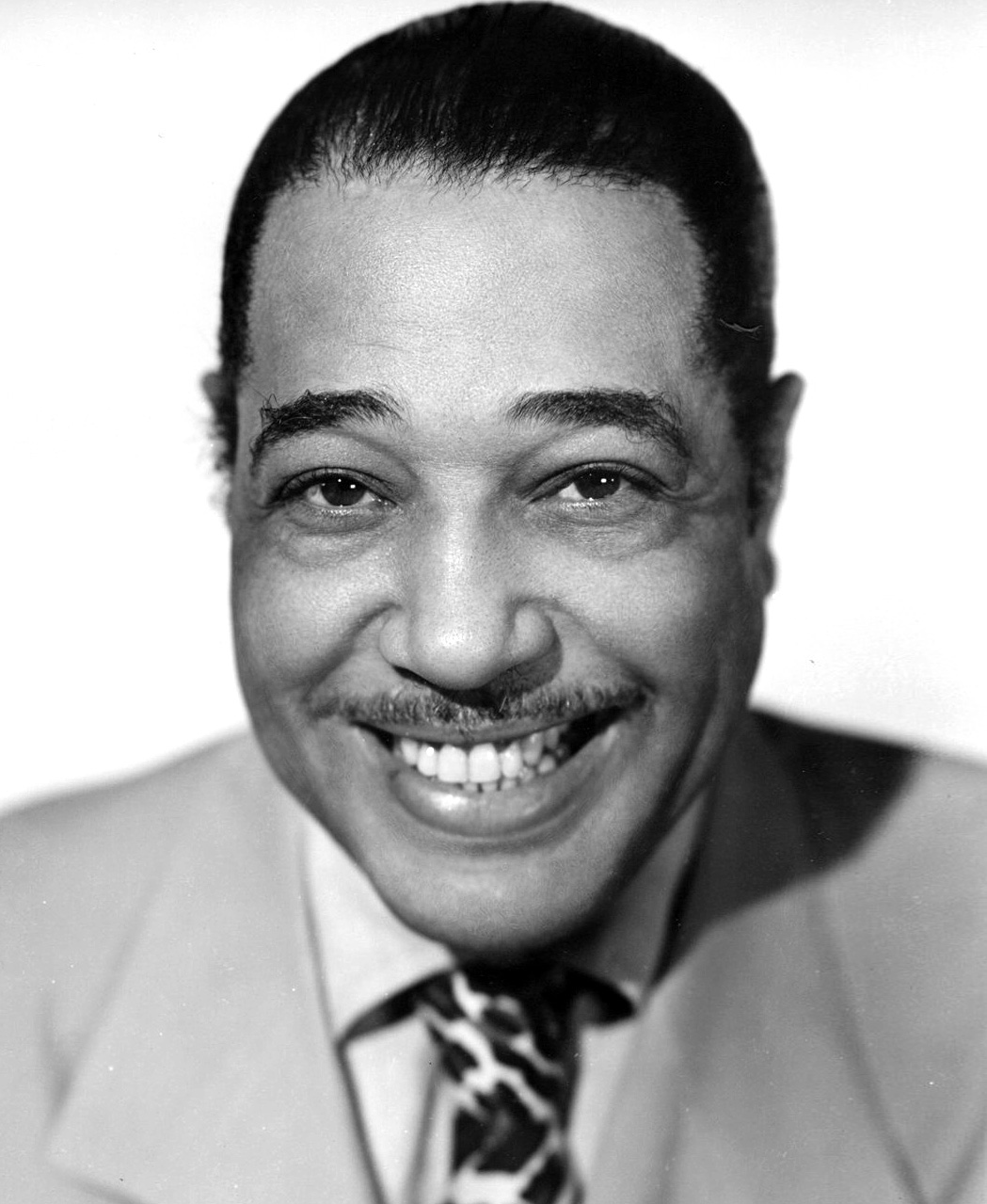
Duke Ellington

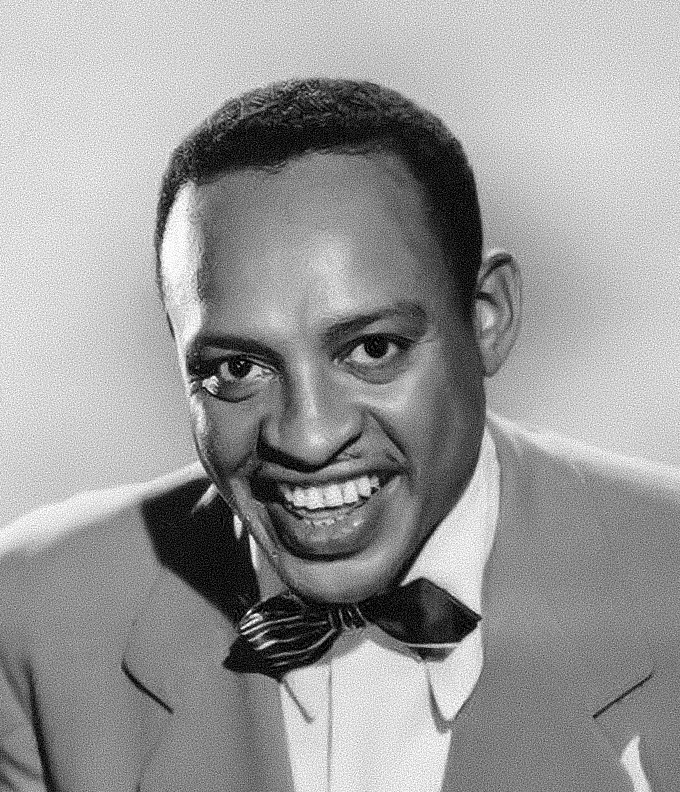
Lionel Hampton

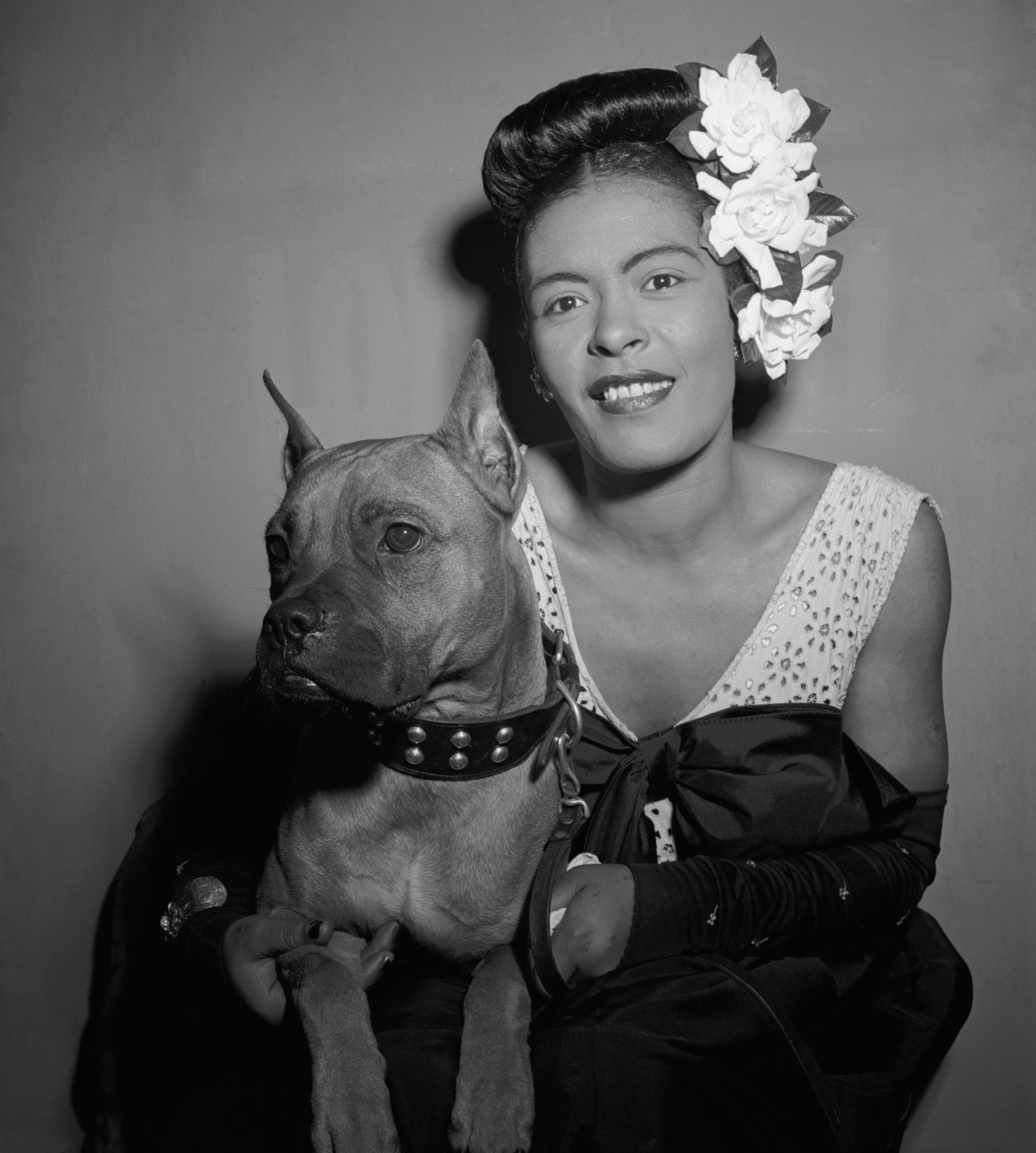
Billie Holiday

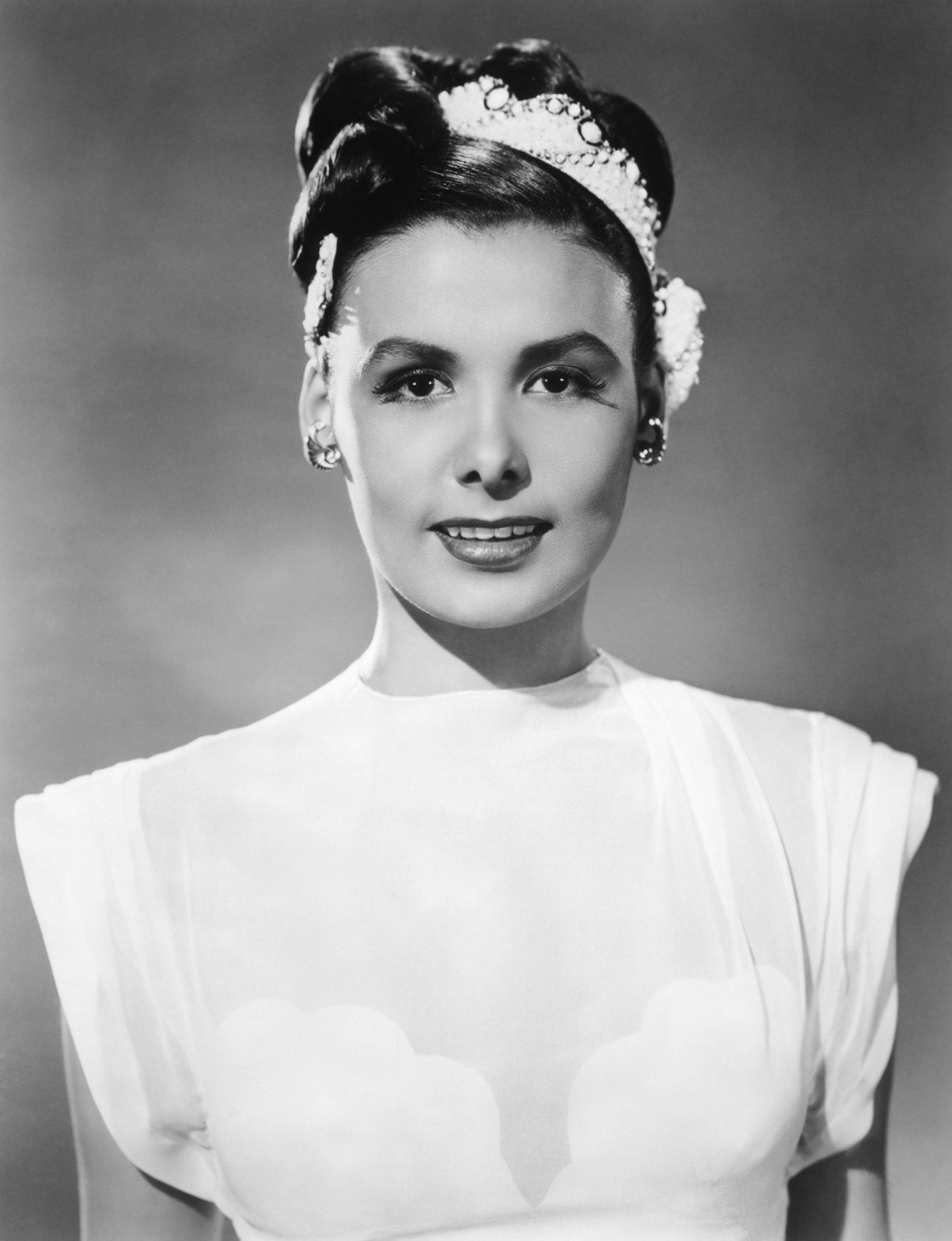
Lena Horne

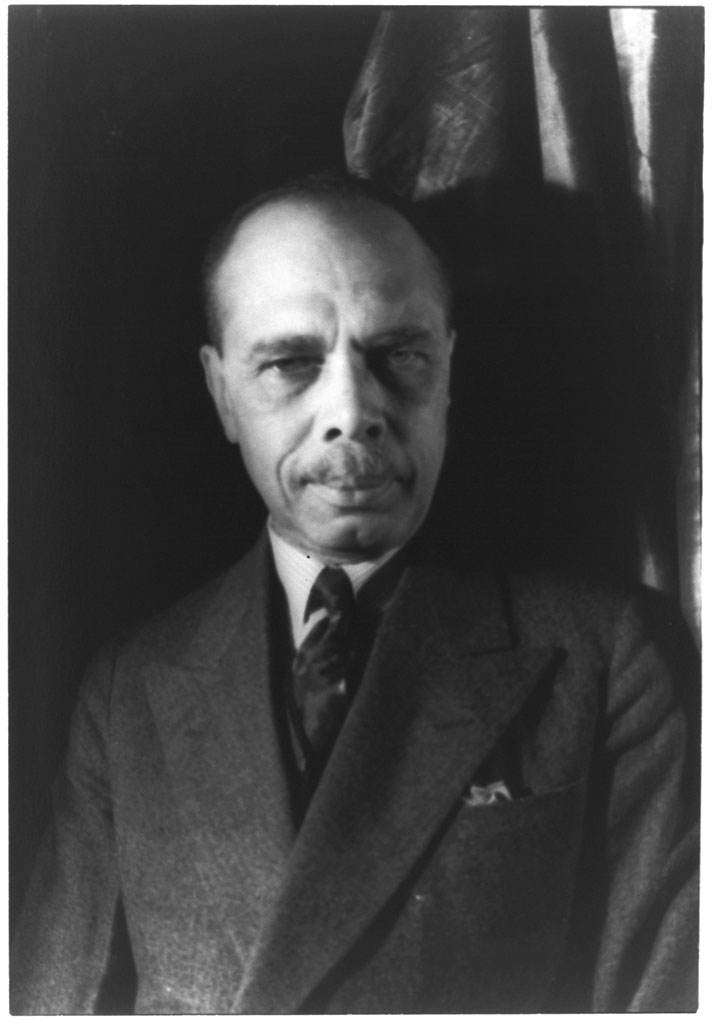
James Weldon Johnson

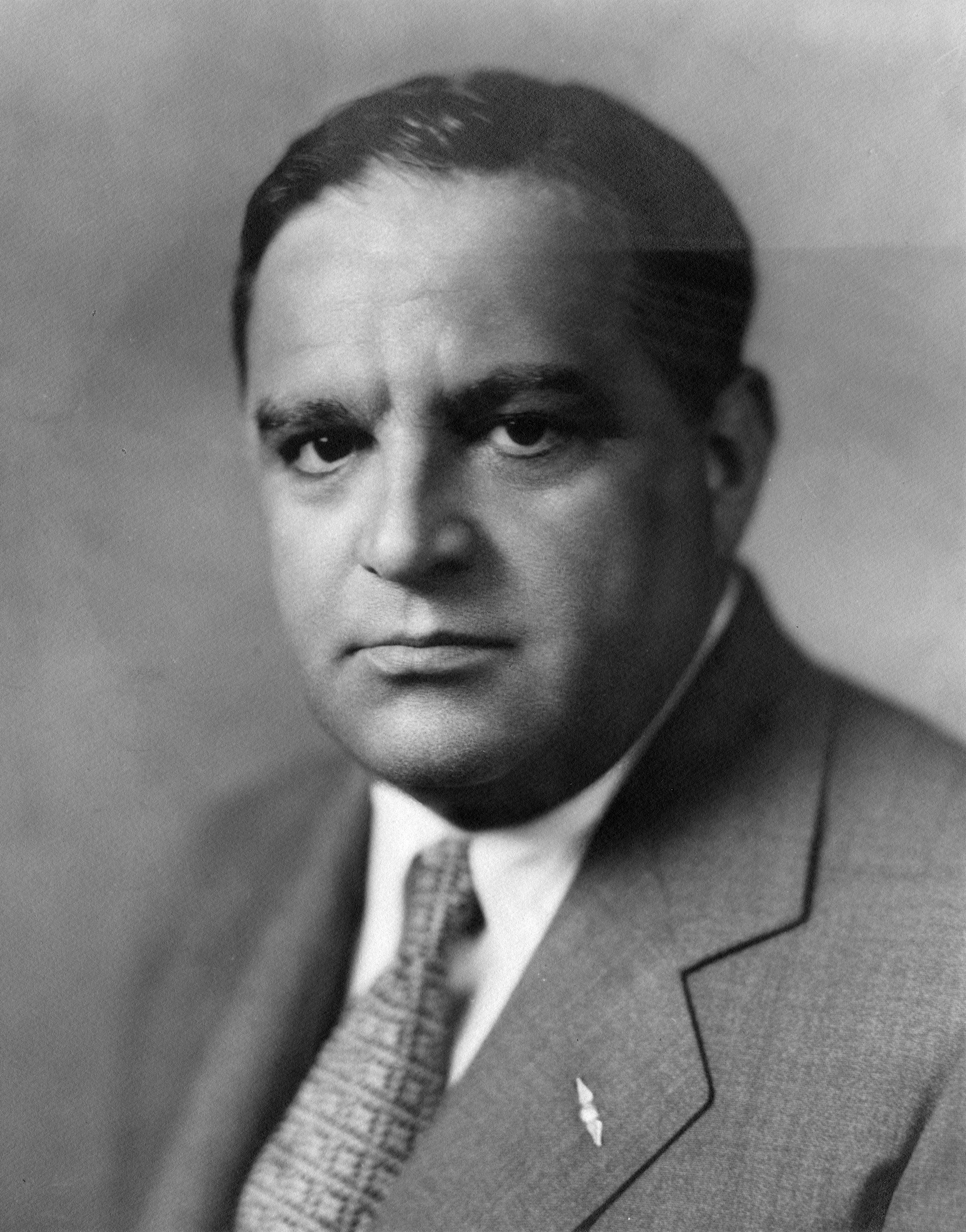
Fiorello La Guardia

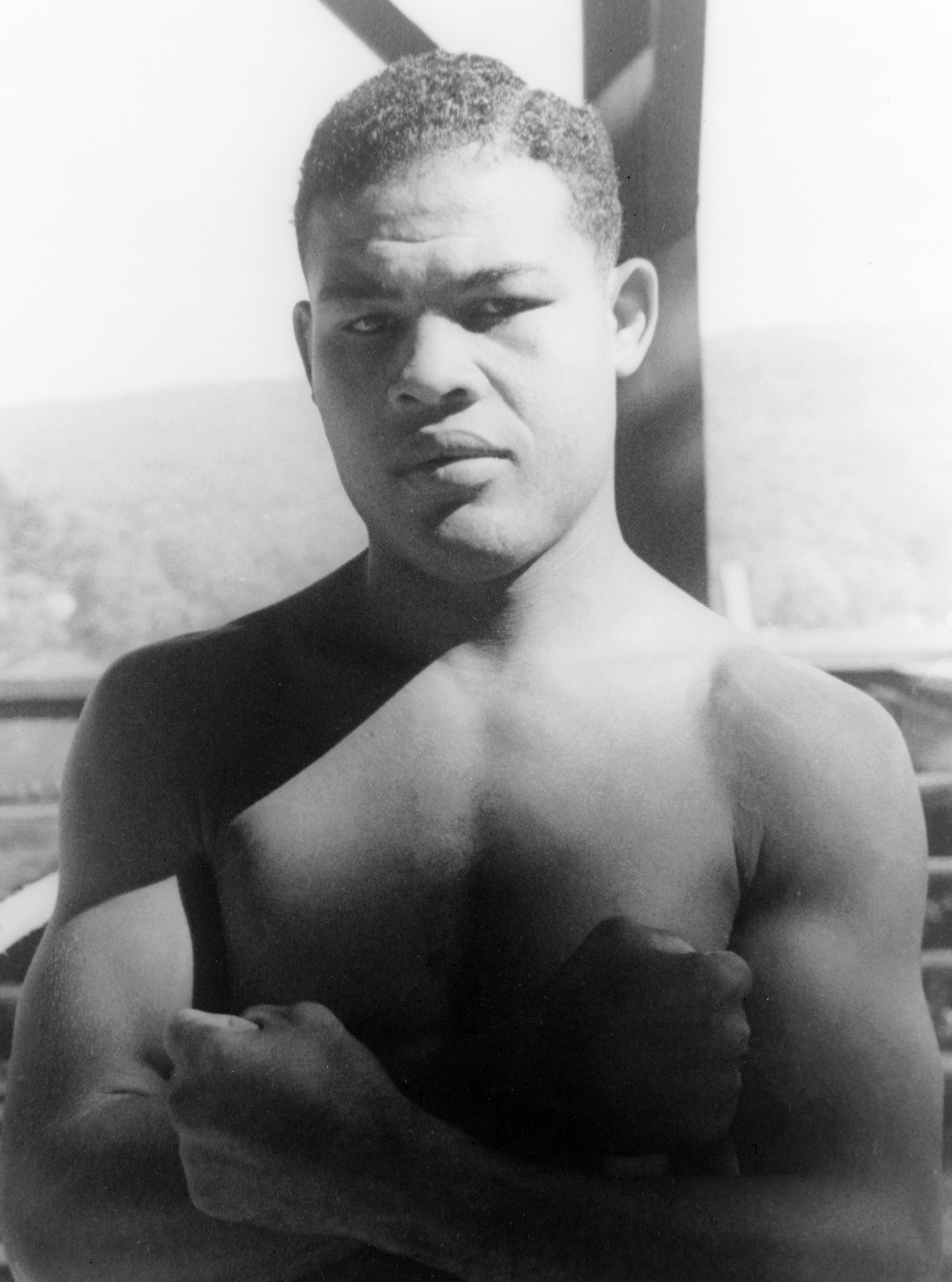
Joe Louis, world heavyweight champion

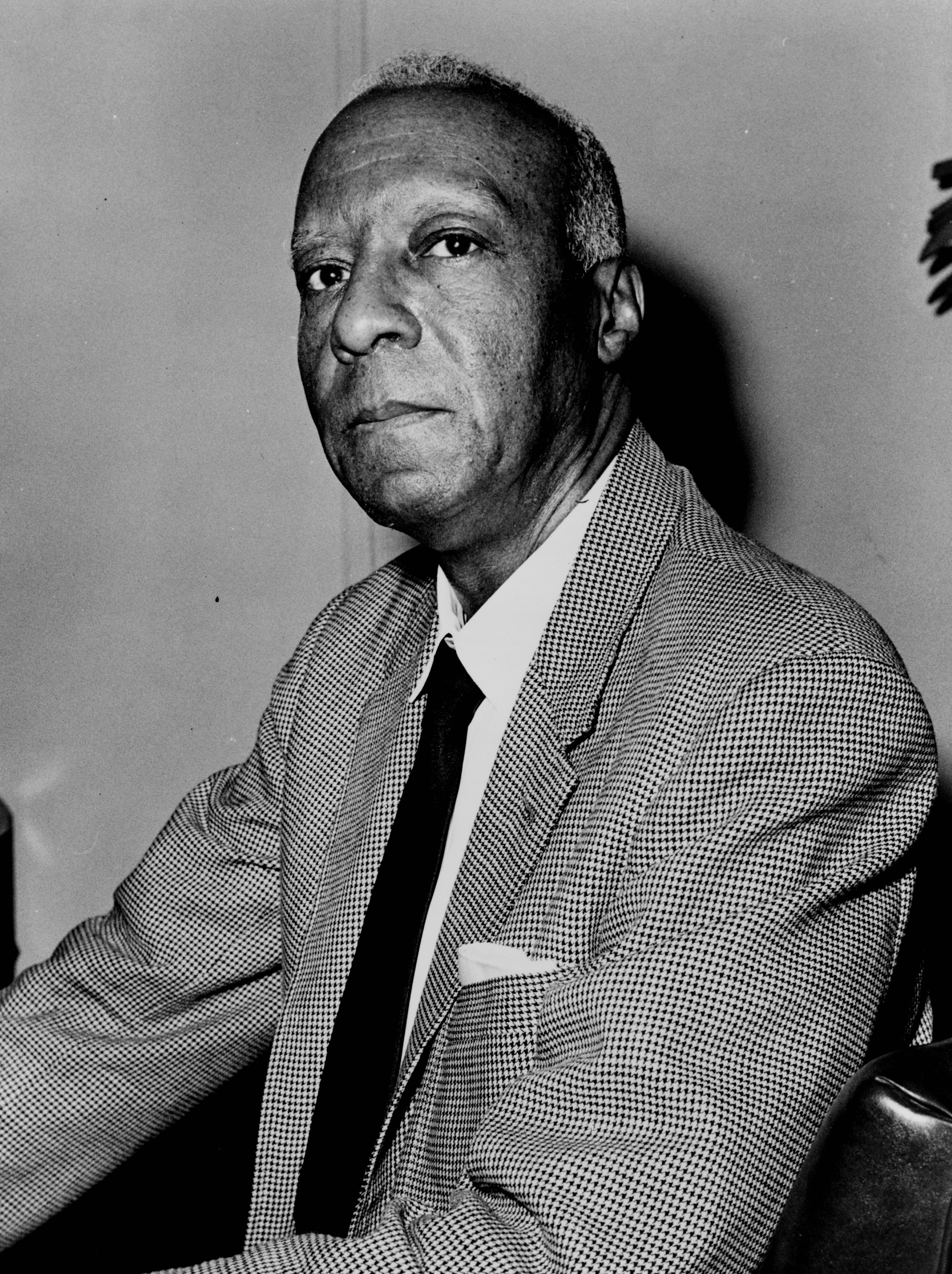
A. Philip Randolph

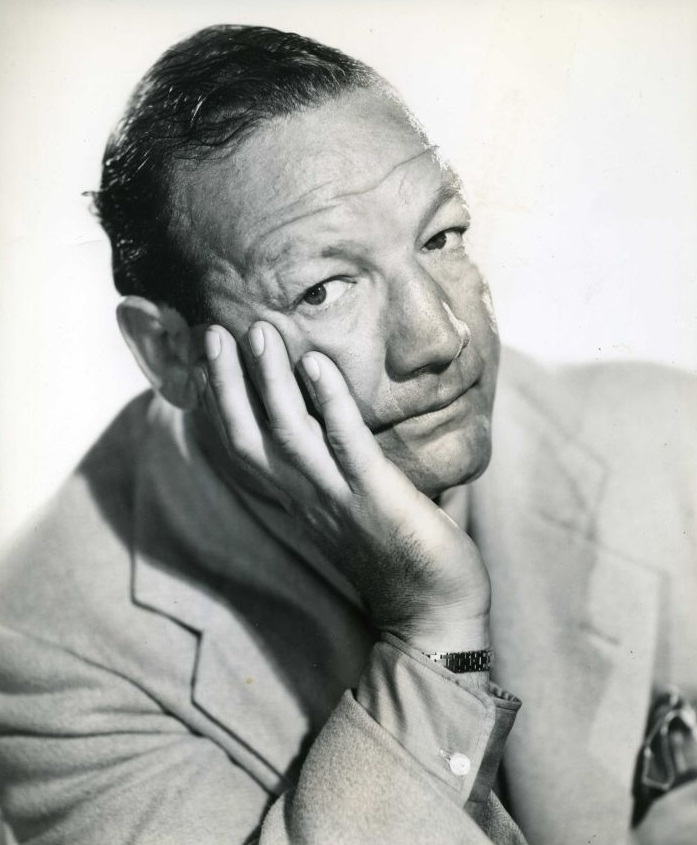
Maxie Rosenbloom, light heavyweight boxing champion.

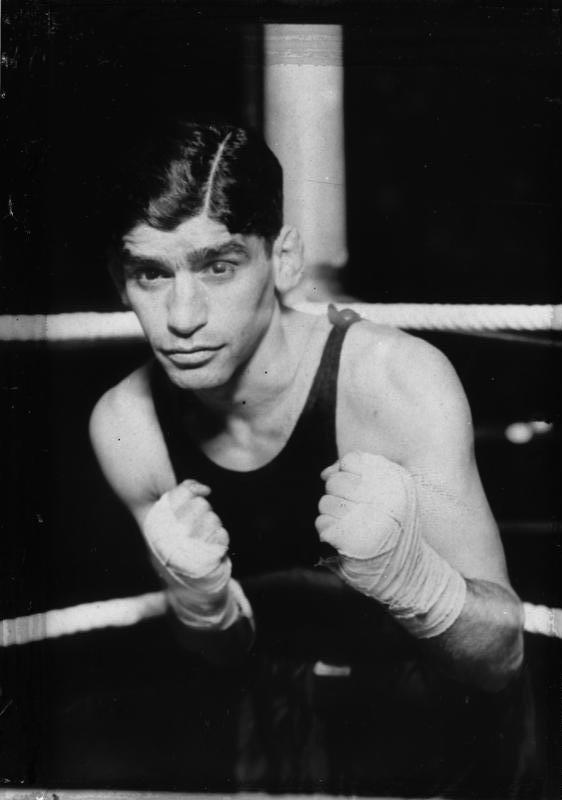
Isadore "Corporal Izzy" Schwartz, world flyweight champion.

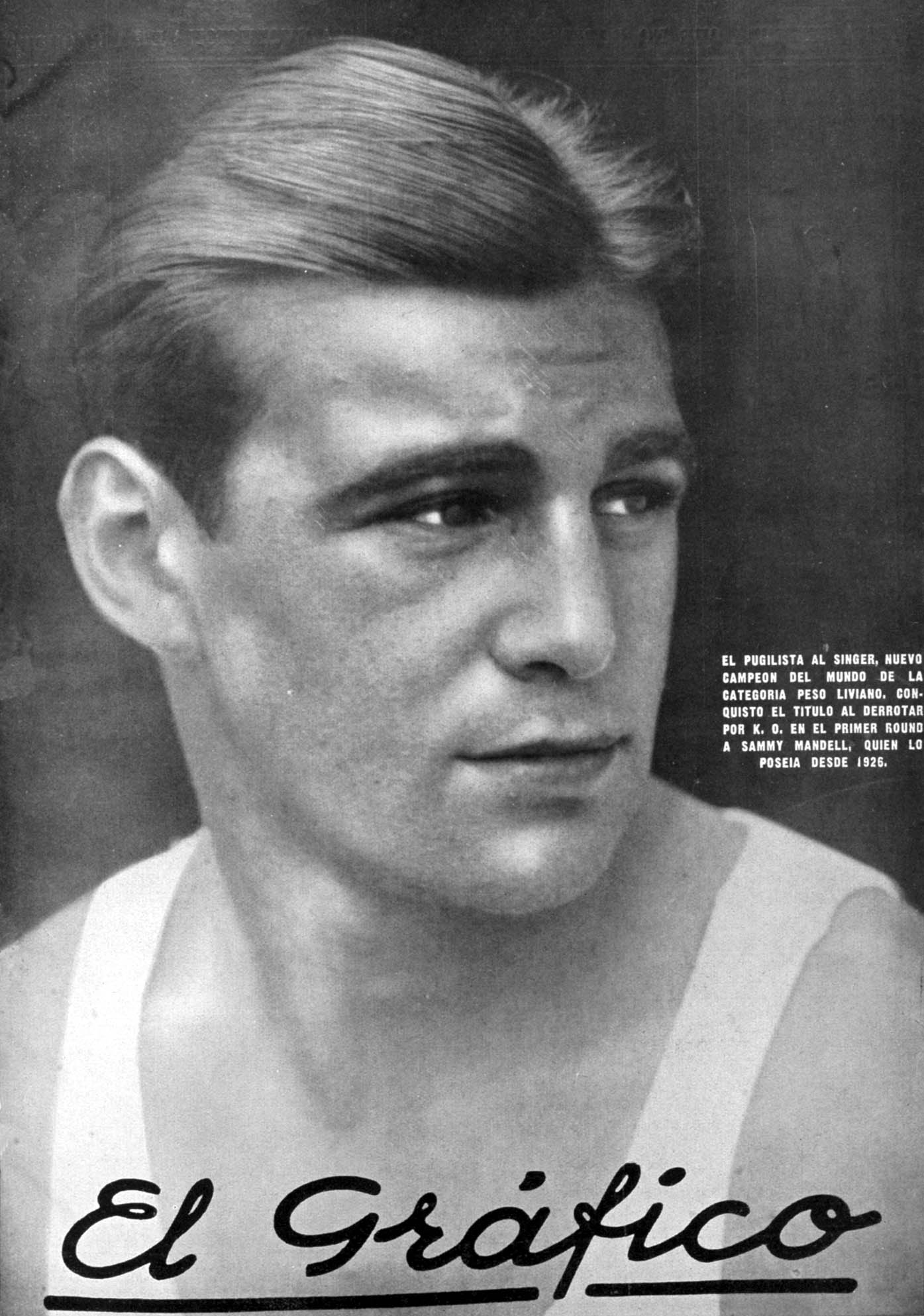
Al Singer, world lightweight champion .

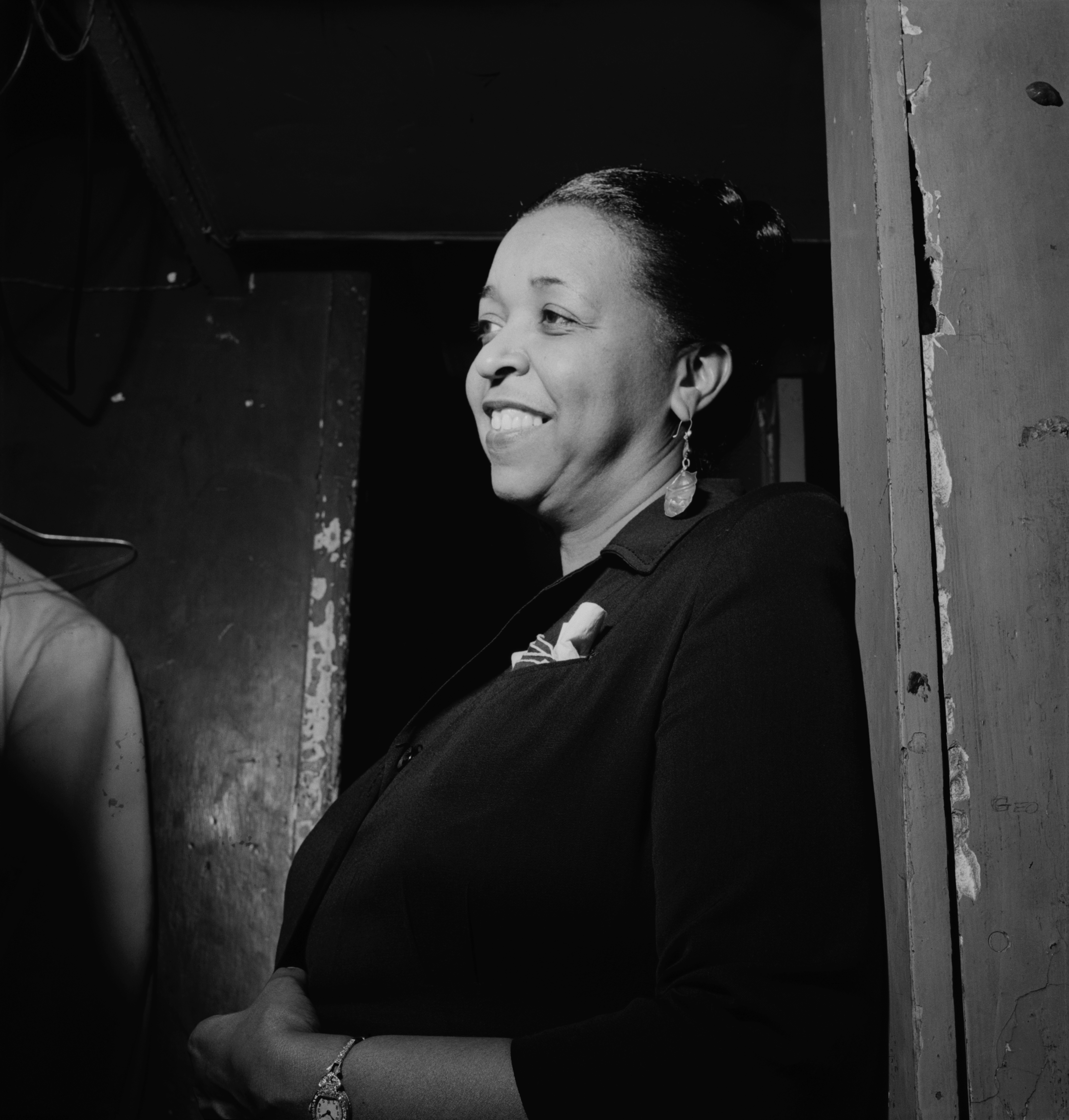
Ethel Waters

- Louis Armstrong – bandleader and trumpet player
- Count Basie – bandleader and pianist; lived at 555 Edgecombe Avenue
- Julius Bledsoe – singer; lived at 409 Edgecombe Avenue
- Arna Bontemps – writer
- Eunice Carter – New York state judge; lived at 409 Edgecombe Avenue
- John Henrik Clarke – editor of Freedomways Magazine and books; professor; moved to Harlem in 1933
- Lady Bird Cleveland (1926–2015) – painter
- Collyer brothers – compulsive hoarders; lived in a townhouse at 128th Street and Fifth Avenue in Harlem their entire adult lives
- Countee Cullen – poet
- Aaron Douglas – painter; lived at 409 Edgecombe Avenue
- W. E. B. Du Bois – activist, writer; lived at 409 Edgecombe
- Duke Ellington – composer, pianist, and bandleader; lived on Riverside Drive and at 555 Edgecombe
- Father Divine – religious leader, lived in several locations in Harlem, including on Astor Row, and maintained offices at 20 West 115th Street
- Rudolph Fisher – writer
- Marcus Garvey – political figure, Pan-Africanist; home at 235 West 131st Street
- Charles Manuel "Sweet Daddy" Grace – evangelist, born in Cape Verde Islands but became prominent in Harlem in the 1920s
- Lionel Hampton – jazz musician; jazz vibraphonist, percussionist, and bandleader; lived in Harlem through World War II and for some years thereafter
- Hubert Harrison – "the father of Harlem Radicalism"
- Coleman Hawkins – musician, saxophone player; lived at 555 Edgecombe Avenue
- Billie Holiday – jazz and swing singer; lived with her mother at 108 West 139th Street
- Casper Holstein – gangster
- Lena Horne – singer, actress, and dancer; lived at 555 Edgecombe Avenue
- Langston Hughes – writer
- Zora Neale Hurston – writer
- Bumpy Johnson – gangster; lived in Lenox Terrace at 132nd Street and Lenox Avenue near the end of his life
- James P. Johnson – pianist
- James Weldon Johnson – author, civil rights activist, composer; lived at 187 West 135th Street
- Fiorello La Guardia – New York mayor, from East Harlem
- Alain Locke – editor
- Joe Louis (the "Brown Bomber") – boxer; world heavyweight champion from 1937 until his temporary retirement in 1949; International Boxing Hall of Fame; lived at 555 Edgecombe Avenue
- Claude McKay – poet and novelist; born in Jamaica but moved to Harlem and wrote the famous novel Home to Harlem, West 131st Street
- Florence Mills – entertainer
- Adam Clayton Powell Sr. – religious, civic leader
- A. Philip Randolph – civil rights activist, labor organizer
- Paul Robeson – singer and actor; lived at 555 Edgecombe Avenue
- Bill "Bojangles" Robinson – dancer; lived on Strivers' Row
- Maxie Rosenbloom ("Slapsy Maxie") – boxer and actor; Light Heavyweight champion; International Boxing Hall of Fame.
- Isadore "Corporal Izzy" Schwartz – boxer, world flyweight champion from 1927 to 1929.
- Al Singer ("The Bronx Beauty") – boxer, undisputed world lightweight champion in 1930.
- Stephanie St. Clair – criminal leader; lived at 409 Edgecombe Avenue
- Willie "The Lion" Smith – pianist
- Wallace Thurman – writer
- Jean Toomer – writer
- James Van Der Zee – photographer
- Madam C.J. Walker – philanthropist and tycoon
- A'Lelia Walker – socialite and businesswoman
- Fats Waller – jazz pianist, born at 107 West 134th Street
- Ethel Waters – singer, actress
- Walter Francis White – civil rights leader; led the National Association for the Advancement of Colored People (NAACP) for a quarter of a century.
- Bert Williams – vaudeville performer; born in Antigua; died in 1922, near the start of the Harlem Renaissance
- Mary Lou Williams – jazz pianist; lived at 63 Hamilton Terrace
- Lillian "Billie" Yarbo – comedienne, dancer, singer

== Famous after World War II ==
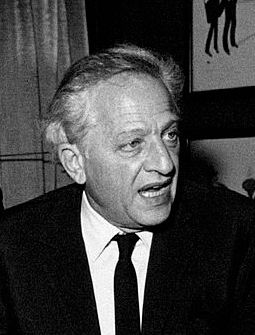
Jules Dassin

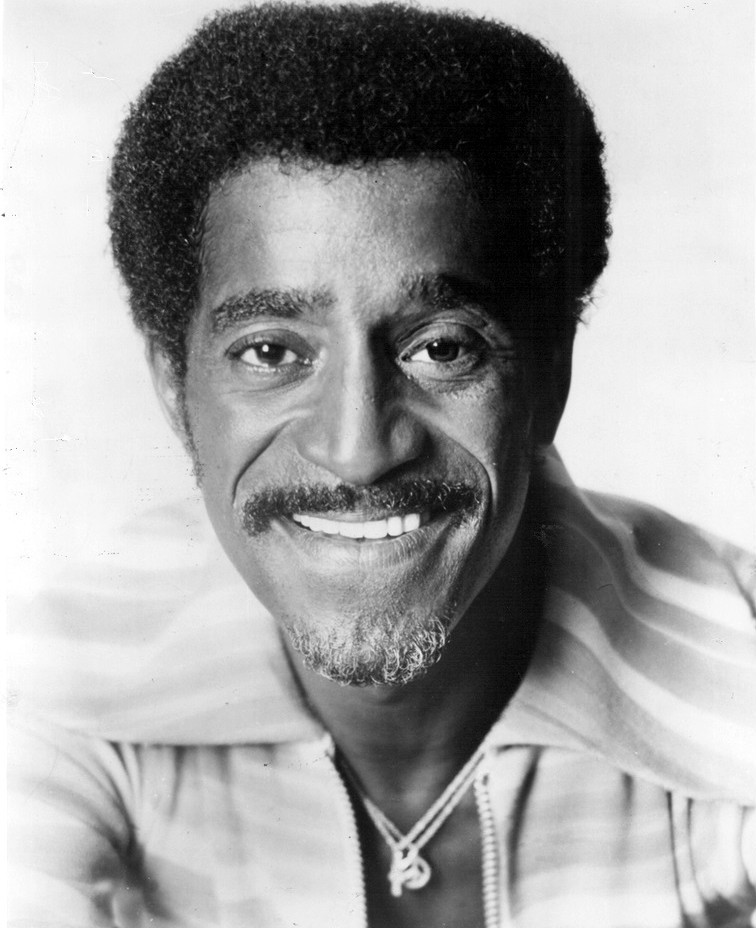
Sammy Davis Jr.

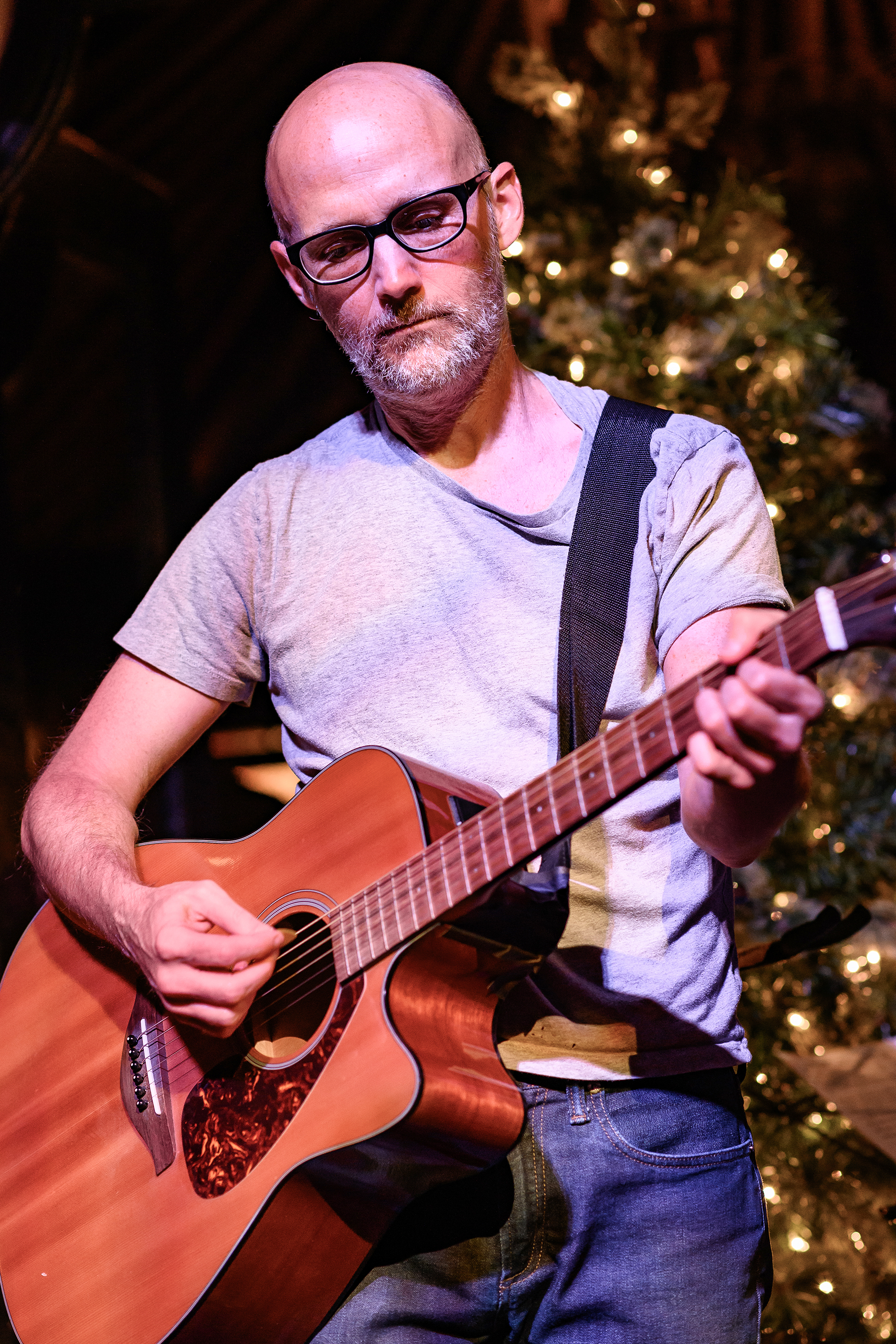
Moby

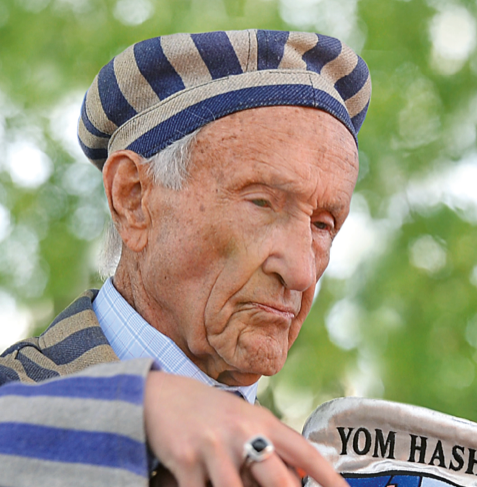
Edward Mosberg

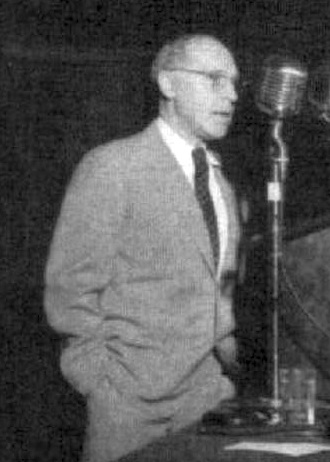
Hermann Joseph Muller, Nobel Prize winner.

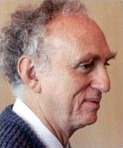
Martin Lewis Perl, Nobel Prize winner.

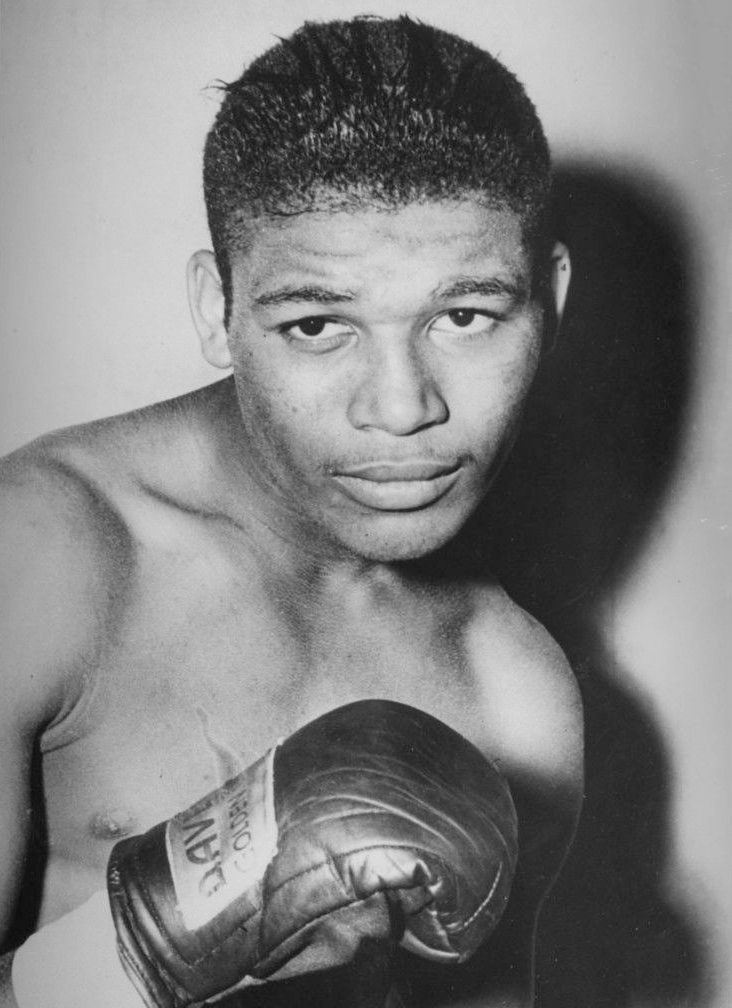
Sugar Ray Robinson, world welterweight and world middleweight champion.

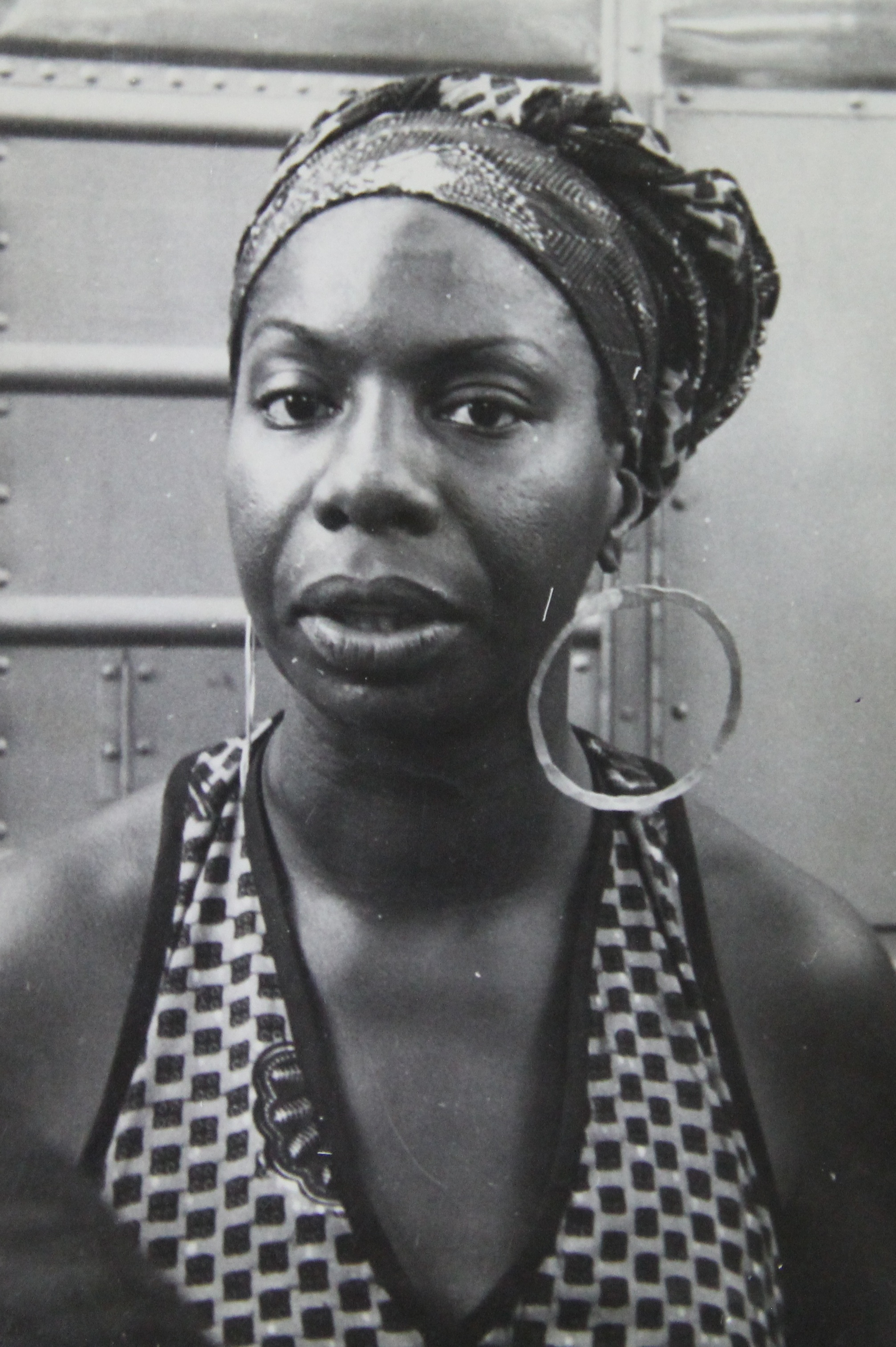
Nina Simone

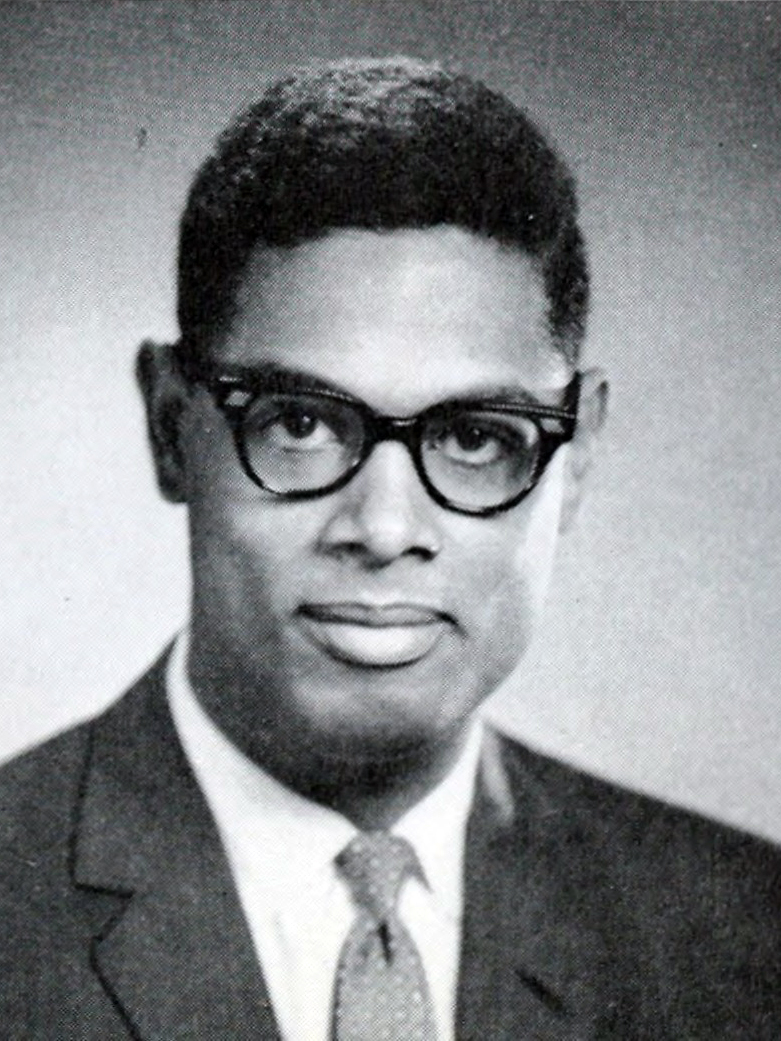
Thomas Sowell

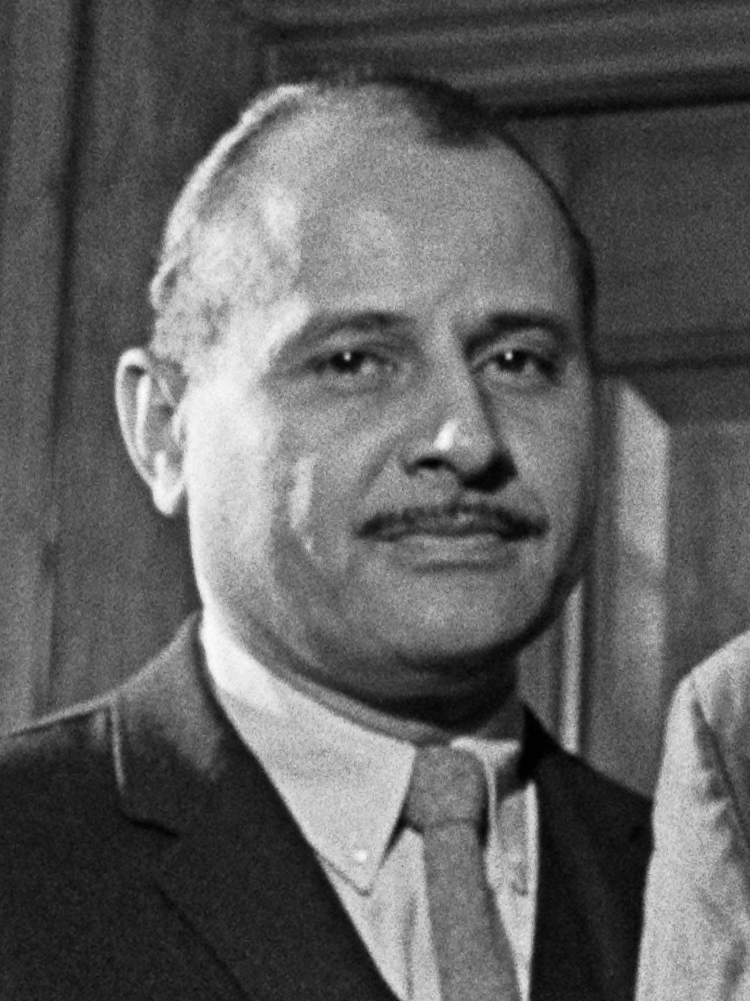
Percy Sutton

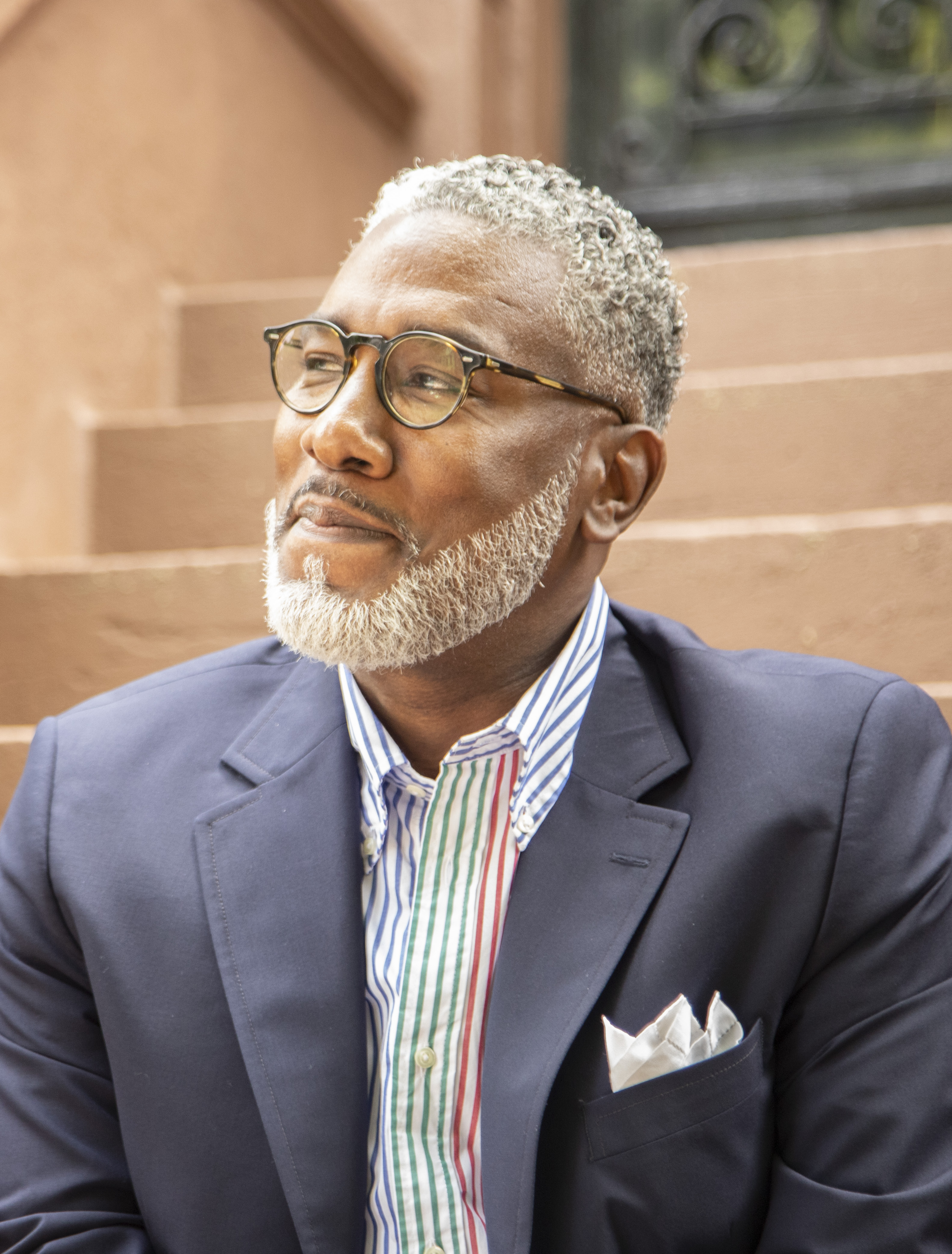
Conrad Tillard

- Miles Aiken – basketball player
- Fiona Apple – singer-songwriter and pianist, raised in Morningside Gardens
- James Baldwin – novelist; lived at 131st Street and Adam Clayton Powell Blvd. (then called "Seventh Avenue")
- Amiri Baraka, born LeRoi Jones – poet
- Patricia Bath, ophthalmologist, inventor, humanitarian, and academic
- Romare Bearden – artist, primarily working in collage
- Harry Belafonte – calypso musician
- Claude Brown – novelist, wrote Manchild in the Promised Land
- Ron Brown – U.S. Secretary of Commerce, grew up in the Hotel Theresa
- Kareem Campbell – pro skateboarder
- George Carlin – comedian; 121st Street between Amsterdam and Broadway
- Jimmy Castor – R&B/funk bandleader
- Dr. Kenneth Clark – psychologist and activist; lived at 555 Edgecombe Avenue
- Pat Cleveland – model
- Jules Dassin – film director, producer, writer, and actor
- Benjamin J. Davis – New York City councilman, ultimately sent to jail for violations of the Smith Act
- Ossie Davis – actor and director; lived in Harlem in the late 1930s and mid-1940s
- Sammy Davis Jr. – entertainer, singer, actor, dancer, member of Rat Pack, born in Harlem Hospital in 1925; inducted into the National Rhythm & Blues Hall of Fame.
- Wanda De Jesus – actress
- David Dinkins – Mayor of New York; lived in the Riverton Houses
- Ralph Ellison – novelist, wrote Invisible Man, about a man who moves from the Deep South to Harlem; lived at 730 Riverside Drive in Harlem
- Erik Estrada – actor, from East Harlem
- Donald Faison – actor
- Jack Geiger – physician, co-founder of Physicians for Social Responsibility; lived with Canada Lee for a year at 555 Edgecombe Avenue
- Althea Gibson – professional tennis player; lived at 115 West 143rd Street
- Oscar Hammerstein II – writer and theatrical producer
- W. C. Handy – composer and bandleader; lived on Strivers' Row in Harlem towards the end of his life
- Lorenz Hart – lyricist
- Johnny Hartman – vocalist; born in Louisiana, grew up in Chicago, moved to Harlem's Sugar Hill in 1950s
- Evan Hunter, aka Ed McBain – author, grew up in East Harlem
- Roy Innis – head of the Congress of Racial Equality; lived in Harlem but ultimately moved to Brooklyn
- June Jordan – Caribbean American poet, essayist, and teacher
- JTG – WWE wrestler
- Ben E. King – soul singer and former lead tenor of The Drifters, best known for the song "Stand By Me"
- Canada Lee – actor; lived at 555 Edgecombe Avenue
- Frank Lucas – drug dealer
- Frankie Lymon – lead tenor of The Teenagers, best known for the song "Why Do Fools Fall in Love?"
- Malcolm X – preacher, revolutionary
- Earl Manigault – basketball player
- Thurgood Marshall – Supreme Court justice; lived at 409 Edgecombe Avenue
- Carl McCall – New York State senator, and Comptroller of New York State
- Jackie McLean – musician, jazz alto saxophone* Arthur Miller – playwright, was married to Marilyn Monroe
- Hal Miller – actor (Sesame Street, Law & Order, etc.); also painter, singer, poet, lyricist, lived at 152nd Street & Macombs Place in the 1950s, born in Harlem
- Moby – musician and animal rights activist, born in Harlem
- Joe Morton – actor, born in Harlem
- Edward Mosberg (1926–2022) – Polish-American Holocaust survivor, educator, and philanthropist
- Hermann Joseph Muller – geneticist; awarded the 1946 Nobel Prize in Physiology or Medicine
- Alice Neel – artist; lived in East Harlem
- Eleanor Holmes Norton – head of the Commission of Human Rights for New York City, now non-voting Delegate from the District of Columbia to the United States House of Representatives
- Gordon Parks – film director and photographer
- Martin Lewis Perl – chemical engineer and physicist; won the 1995 Nobel Prize in Physics
- Samuel Pierce – Ronald Reagan's Secretary of Housing and Urban Development; lived in the Riverton Houses
- Adam Clayton Powell Jr. – politician
- Bud Powell – musician, pianist
- Tito Puente, Sr. – musician, Spanish Harlem
- Gene Anthony Ray – dancer and actor
- Ving Rhames – actor
- Brandon "Scoop B" Robinson, NBA analyst
- Sugar Ray Robinson – boxer, entrepreneur; International Boxing Hall of Fame; moved to Harlem at age 12
- Sonny Rollins – musician, tenor saxophone
- Steve Rossi – comedian, former manager for Howard Stern
- Henry Roth – novelist
- J. D. Salinger – novelist; lived at 3681 Broadway until he was nine years old
- Isabel Sanford – actress; co-star of The Jeffersons
- Hazel Scott – jazz and classical pianist, wife of Adam Clayton Powell, Jr., first African-American woman with her own television show
- Nina Simone – composer concert pianist, singer, songwriter, and civil rights activist; lived, for a time, in Duke Ellington's old house in Harlem
- Thomas Sowell – economist, economic historian, social theorist, and author
- Billy Strayhorn – jazz composer, arranger
- Percy Sutton – Borough President of Manhattan: "If I were offered a million dollars, I wouldn't leave Harlem."
- Billy Taylor – jazz pianist; lived in the Riverton Houses
- Clarice Taylor – actress on the Cosby Show
- Conrad Tillard (born 1964) - politician, Baptist minister, radio host, author, and civil rights activist
- Dinah Washington – "Queen of the Blues"; born in Alabama but became famous when she lived in Harlem
- Roy Wilkins – civil rights leader; lived at 409 Edgecombe
- Billy Dee Williams – actor
- Louis T. Wright – physician, chairman of the board of the NAACP
- Morrie Yohai – rabbi, inventor of Cheez Doodles

== Entertainment ==
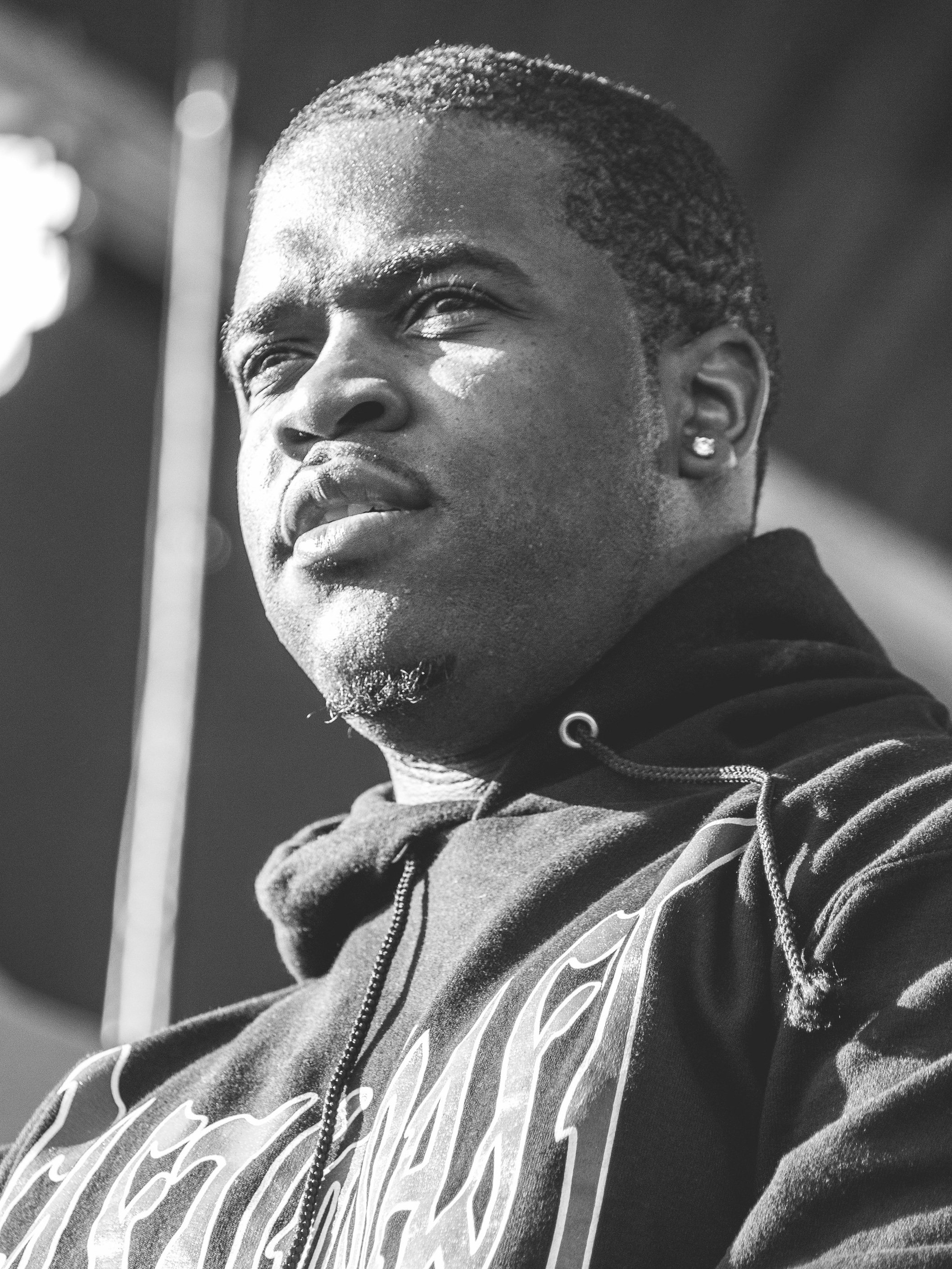
ASAP Ferg

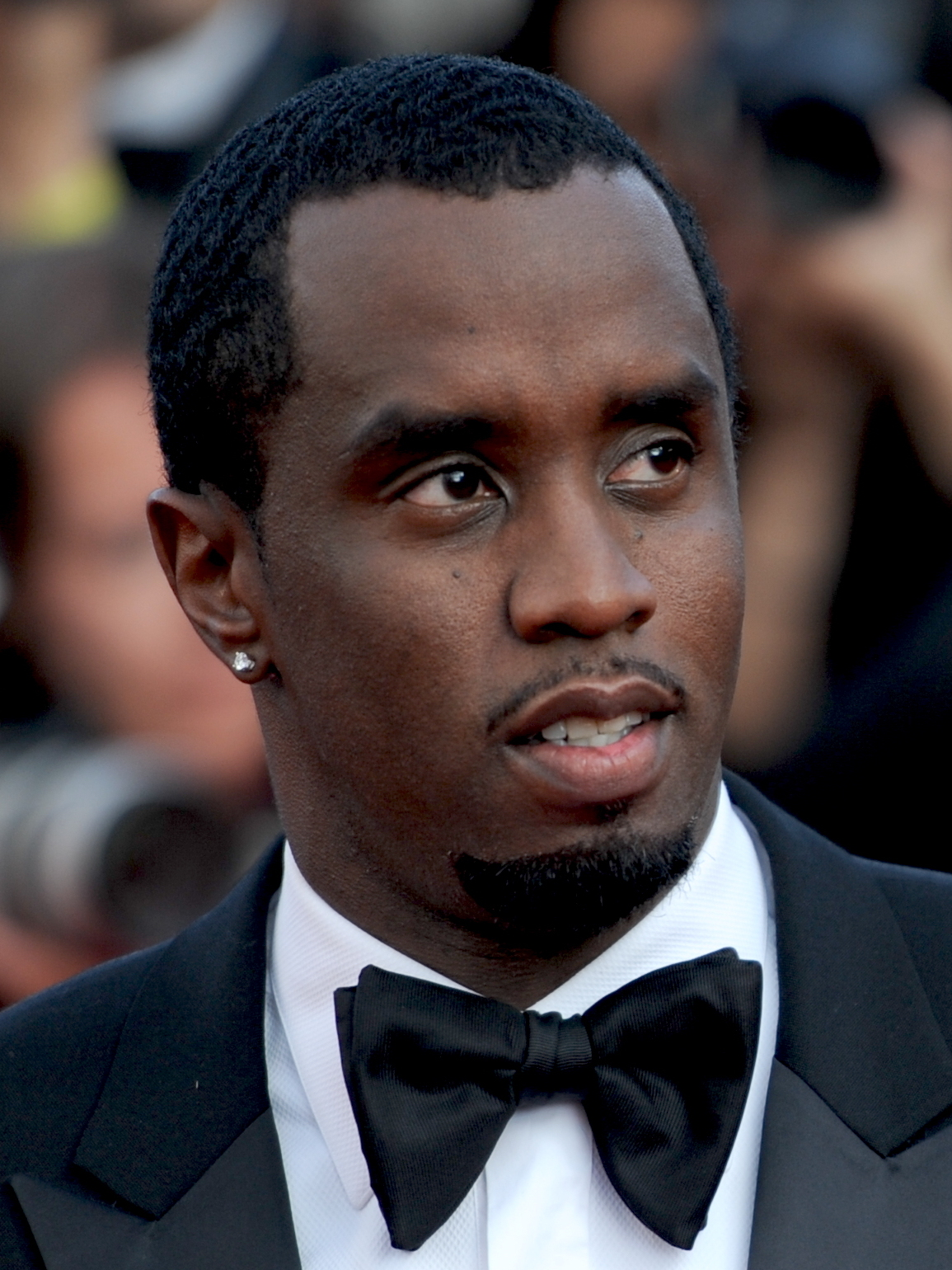
Puff Daddy

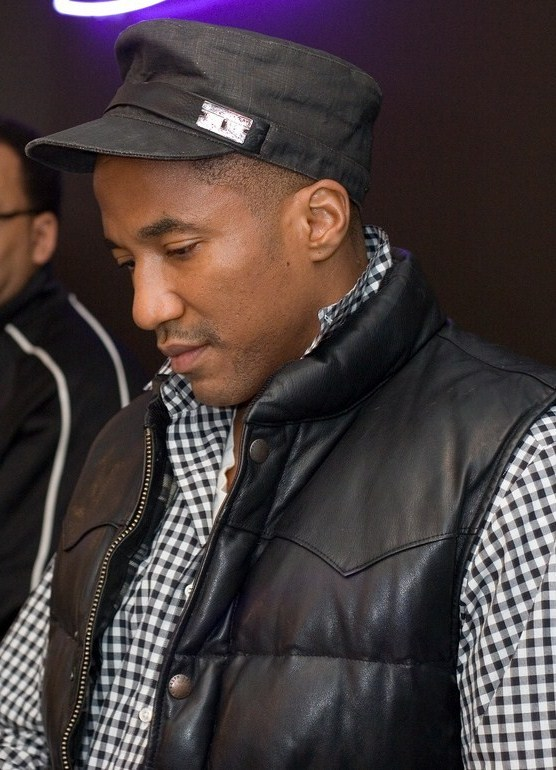
Q-Tip

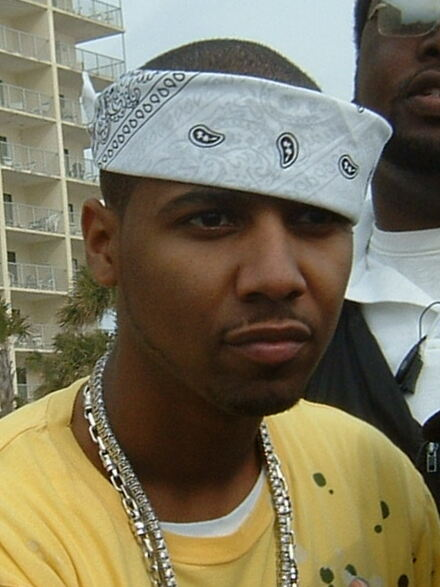
Juelz Santana

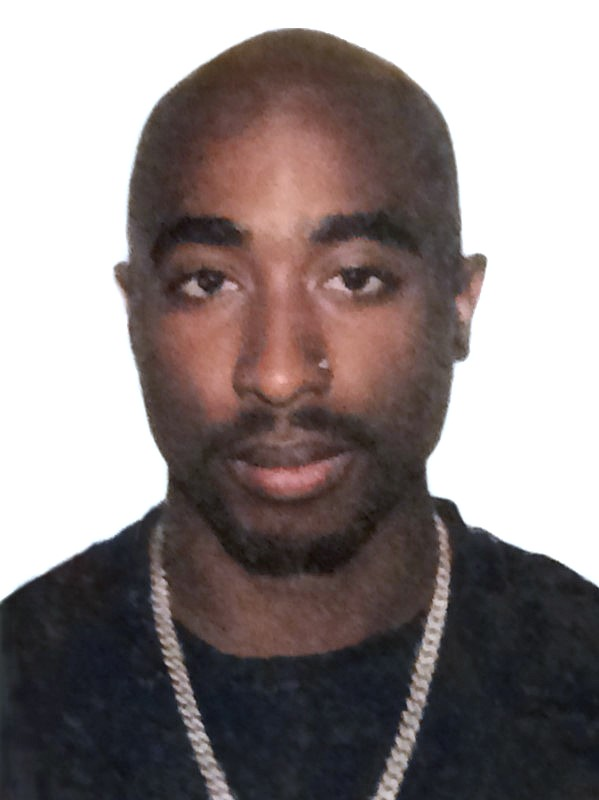
Tupac Shakur

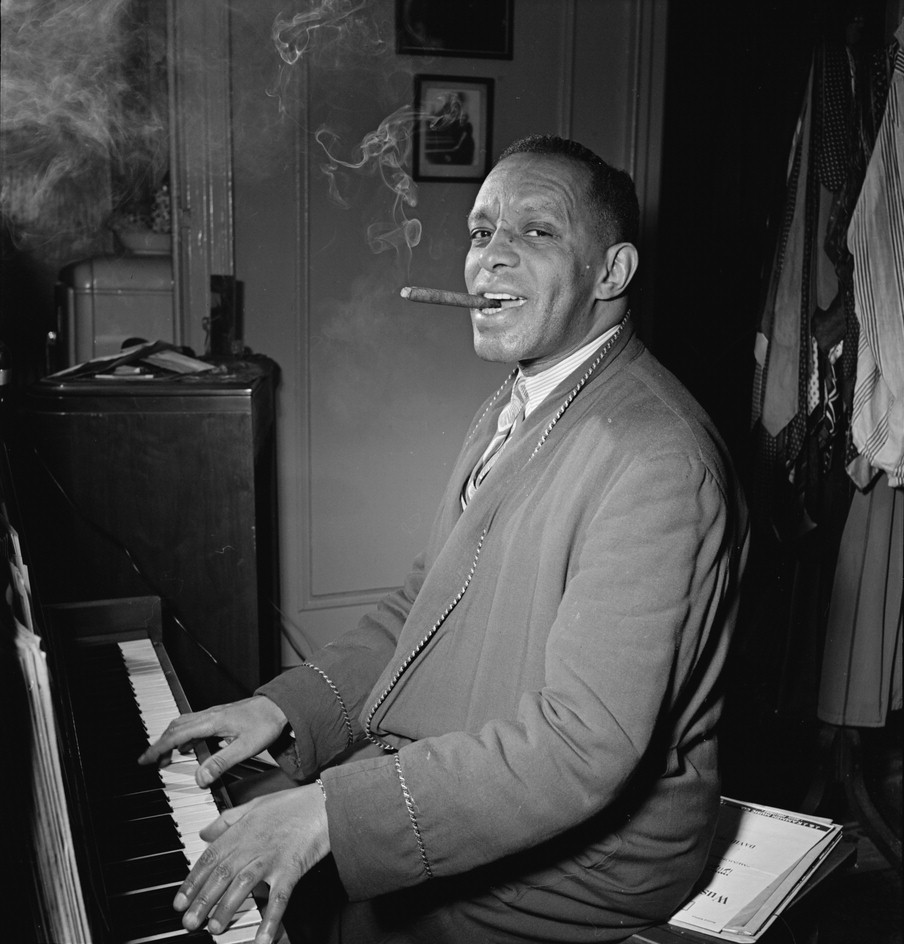
Willie "the Lion" Smith

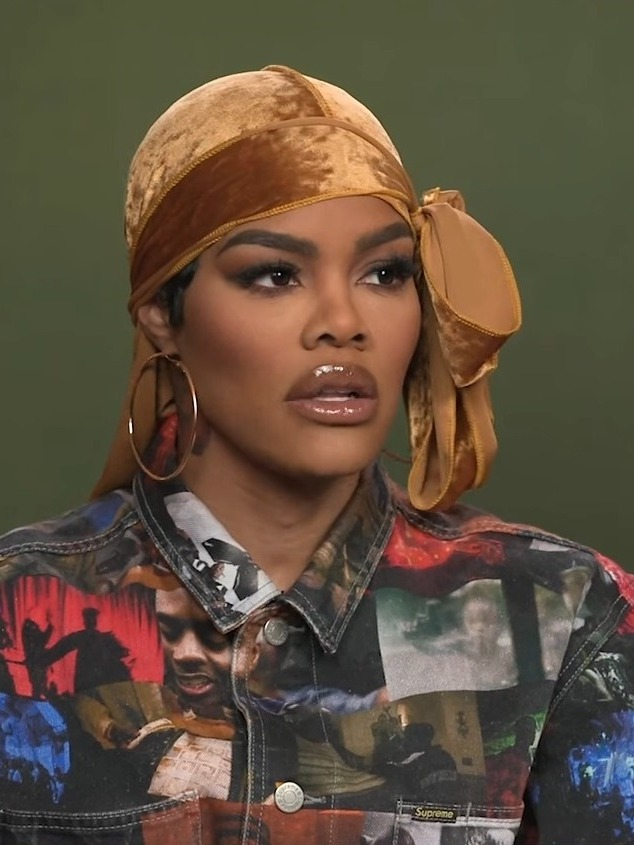
Teyana Taylor

- 40 Cal – rapper
- ASAP Ferg – rapper (member of ASAP Mob)
- ASAP Rocky – rapper (member of ASAP Mob)
- Bodega Bamz – rapper, songwriter, actor
- Azealia Banks – rapper, singer, lyricist
- Stuart Bascombe – R&B/soul singer, songwriter, producer and actor
- Rob Base and DJ E-Z Rock – rap duo best known for their hit "It Takes Two"
- Big L (1974 –1999) – rapper
- Kurtis Blow – rapper
- Leroy Burgess – musician, singer, songwriter and producer
- Kareem "Biggs" Burke – co-founder of Roc-A-Fella Records
- Black Ivory – R&B vocal group
- Black Rob (1968– 2021) – rapper from Spanish Harlem
- Cam'ron – rapper (owner of Diplomat Records) (Dipset)
- Cannibal Ox – rap duo
- Crash Crew – old-school rap group
- Yaya DaCosta – America's Next Top Model contestant/model, actress
- Damon Dash – co-founder of Roc-A-Fella Records
- Sugarhill Ddot – child rapper
- Kool Moe Dee – old-school rapper and one-third of the Treacherous Three
- DJ Hollywood – VH-1 hip-hop honoree; rap/hip-hop pioneer
- DJ Red Alert – DJ, hip-hop pioneer
- Famous Dex – rapper
- Dave East – rapper (Mass Appeal Records)
- Fatman Scoop – Grammy and MTV Award winner; radio personality; reality TV star
- The Fearless Four – pioneer rap group
- Freekey Zekey – rapper (owner, CEO of 730 Dips Records)
- Doug E. Fresh – '80s rapper, runs a waffle house in Harlem
- Spoonie Gee – pioneer rapper
- Charles Hamilton – rapper
- Ilacoin – hip-hop artist, creator of the "Pause" game
- Freddie Jackson – R&B singer
- Jim Jones – rapper (co-CEO of Diplomat Records) (Dipset)
- Joe Budden – former rapper, media personality, host of The Joe Budden Podcast
- Al Jolson – singer, comedian, actor, and vaudevillian.
- Kelis – R&B singer and songwriter
- Lil Mama – rapper; judge of America's Best Dance Crew
- Biz Markie (1964–2021) – rapper, disc jockey, owns a Waffle House
- Mase – rapper
- Jae Millz – rapper
- P-Star – rapper, singer, actress
- Puff Daddy – rapper, businessman, founder of Bad Boy Records
- Q-Tip – rapper, record producer (A Tribe Called Quest)
- Immortal Technique – rapper
- Russell Patterson – singer, songwriter, producer and actor
- Rayne Storm – rapper, producer (Digiindie)
- Carl Hancock Rux – writer, performer
- Teddy Riley – record producer, artist
- Juelz Santana – rapper (owner, CEO of Skull Gang Records)
- Bre Scullark – America's Next Top Model contestant, model
- Willie "the Lion" Smith – jazz and stride pianist
- Smoke DZA – rapper
- Dani Stevenson – R&B singer
- Keith Sweat – singer
- Teyana Taylor – singer and rapper signed to Kanye West's G.O.O.D. Music label, actress, dancer
- Treacherous Three – old-school rap group
- Tupac Shakur (1971–1996) – rapper, actor,
- Vado – rapper (We The Best Records)
- Sheck Wes – rapper
- J.R. Writer – rapper (Dipset member)
- Dave Wooley – director, producer, author, and entrepreneur

== 21st-century residents ==
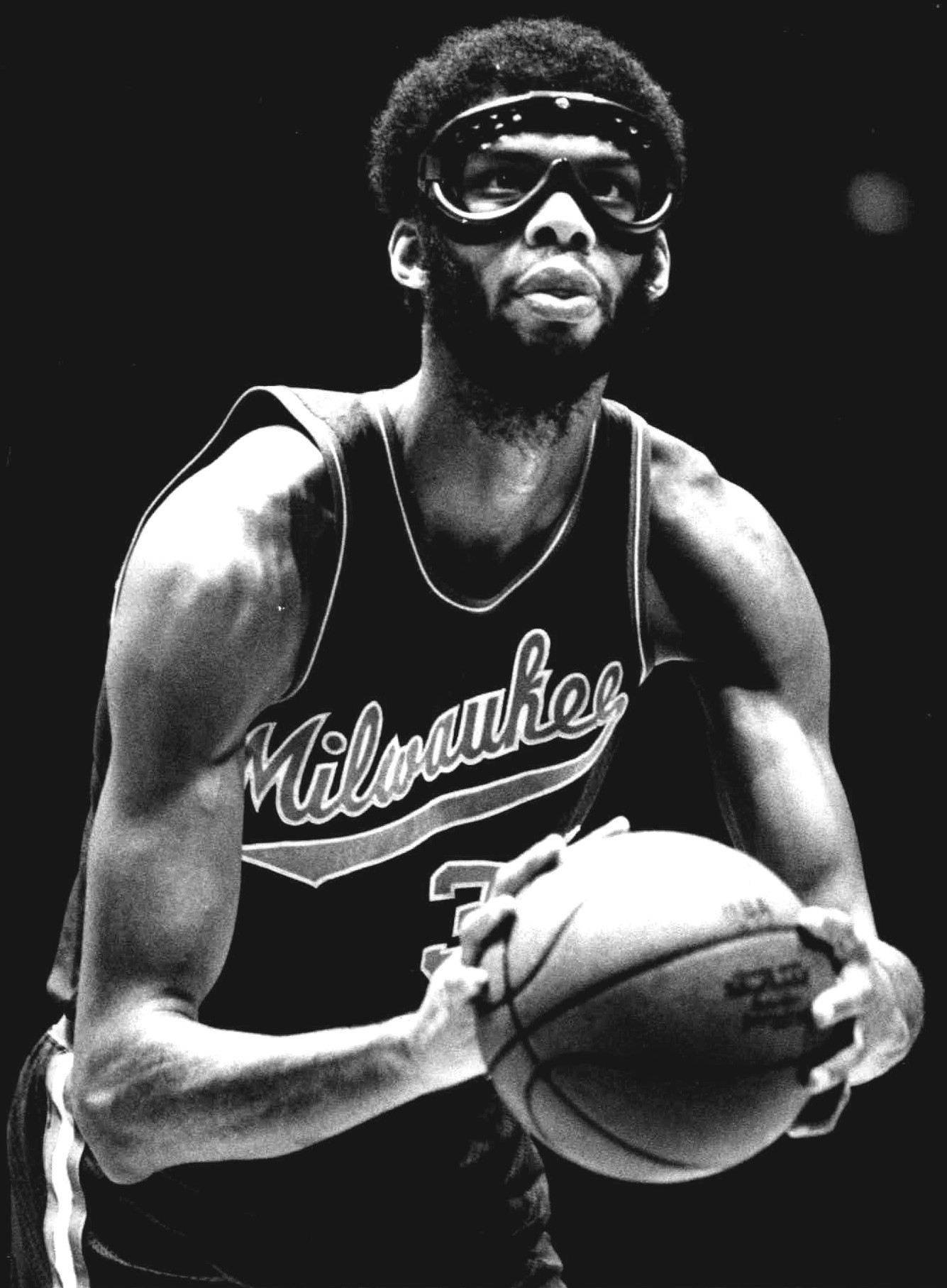
Kareem Abdul-Jabbar

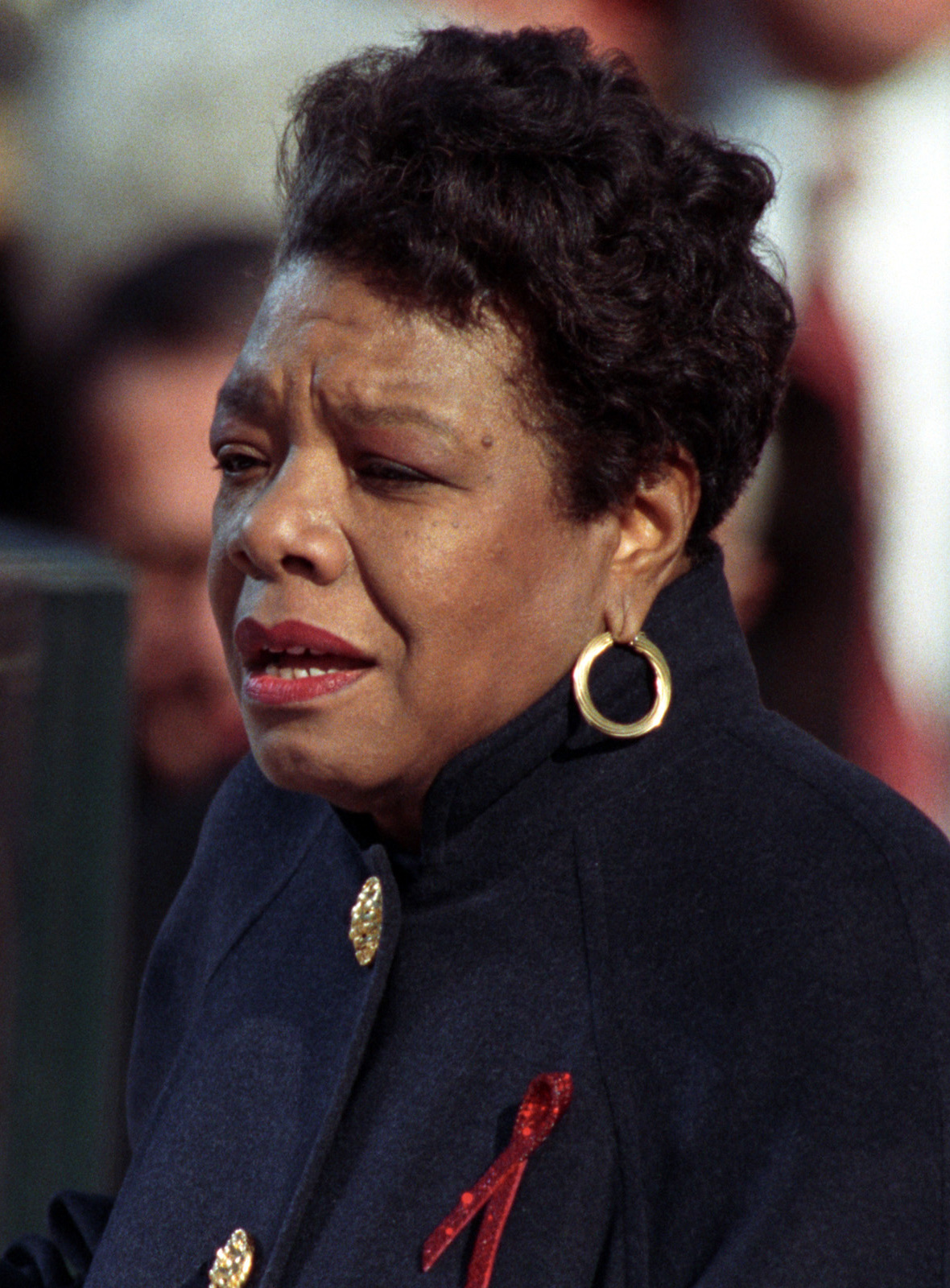
Maya Angelou

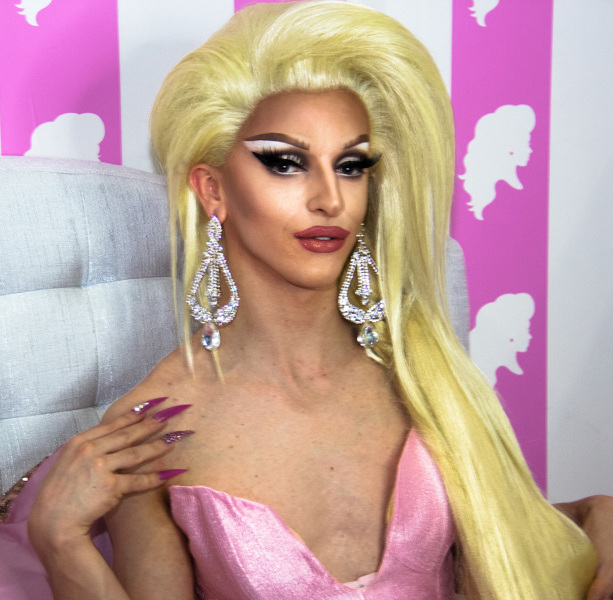
Miz Cracker

Bob Dylan

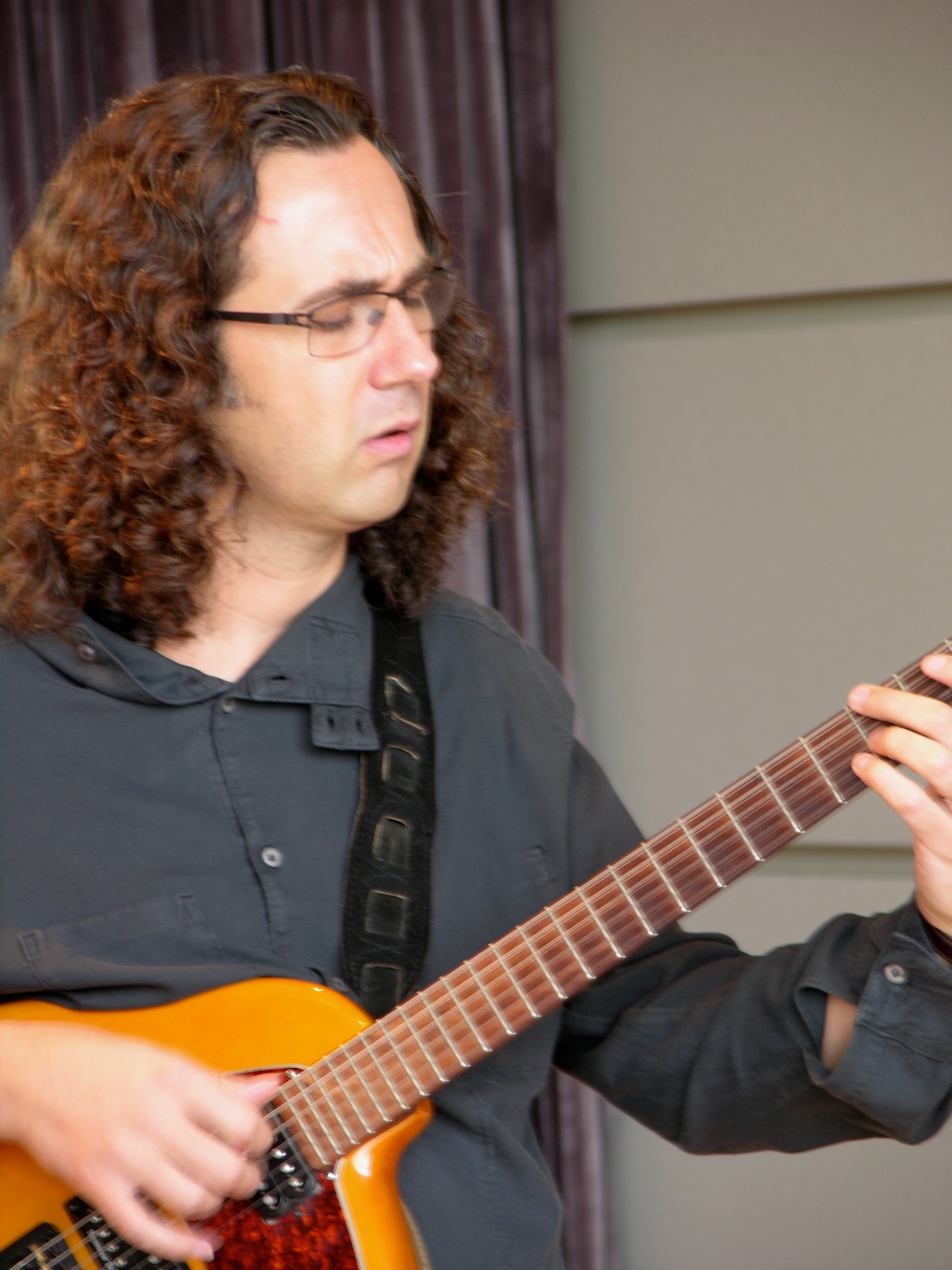
Oscar Peñas

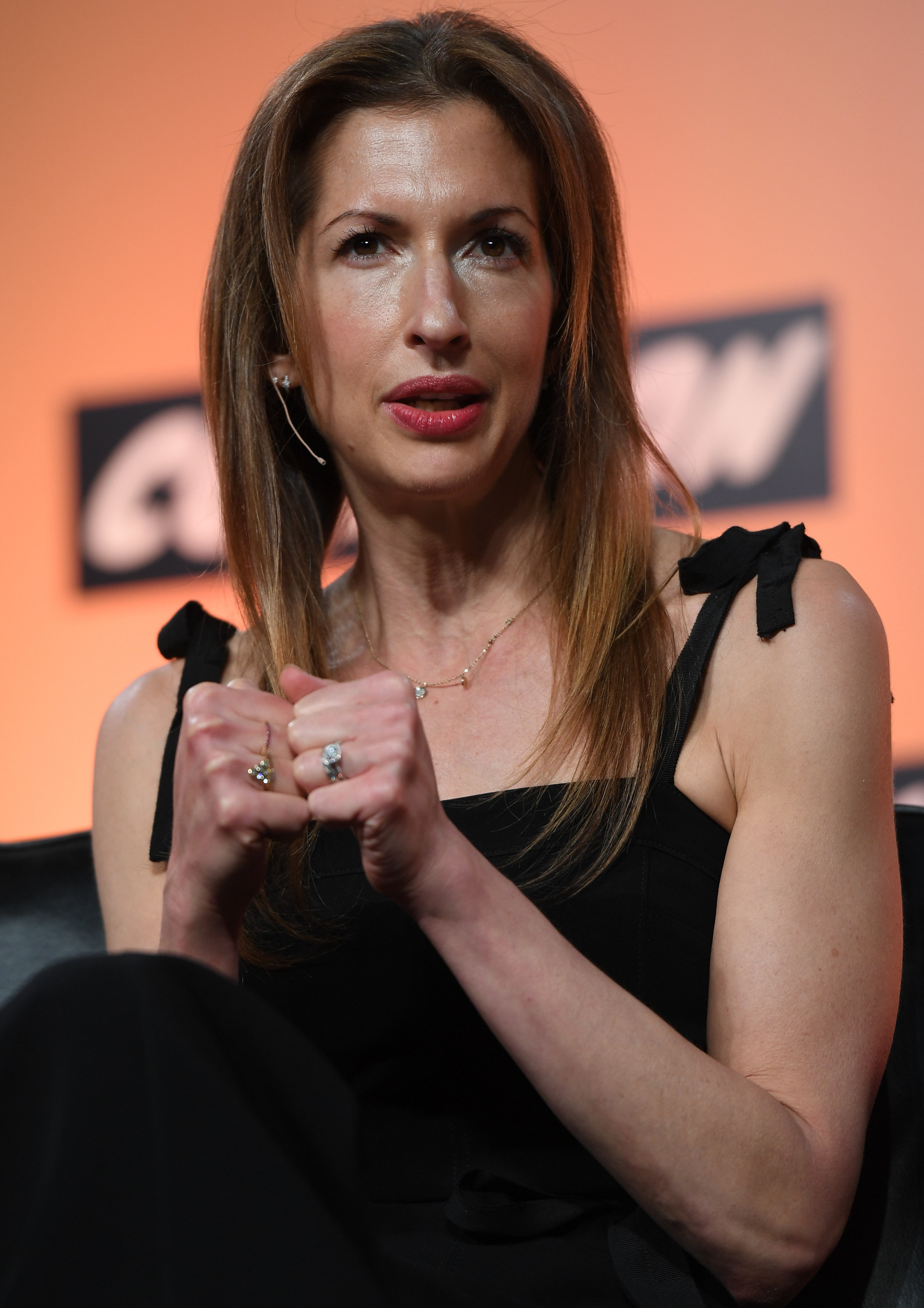
Alysia Reiner

- Kareem Abdul-Jabbar – basketball player, Basketball Hall of Fame, moved into a Mount Morris brownstone at 30 West 120th Street in September 2006
- Lorraine Adams – writer and journalist
- Maya Angelou – poet and author, owned a home on 120th Street in Mount Morris Park district
- Angela Bassett – Emmy and Academy Award-nominated, and Golden Globe-winning actress
- Keith David – actor and singer
- Charlotte d'Amboise – actress and dancer
- Bob Dylan – singer-songwriter; Nobel Prize in Literature; Academy Award,10 Grammy Awards, Presidential Medal of Freedom, Rock and Roll Hall of Fame, Songwriters Hall of Fame, Pulitzer Prize special citation; owned a brownstone on Striver's Row from 1980s until year 2000. The townhouse is located at 265 West 139th Street and it sold in 2018 for $3.7M
- Jonathan Franzen – novelist and essayist; lived on 125th Street when he wrote his book The Corrections
- Daphne Frias – activist
- Marcia Gay Harden – Oscar-winning actress
- Edward W. Hardy – composer, musician and producer
- Neil Patrick Harris – Emmy and Tony Award winning actor; lives near Morningside Park when not in Los Angeles
- Rashidah Ismaili, writer
- Jeff L. Lieberman – film director
- Terrance Mann – actor and dancer
- Cameron Mathison – actor on All My Children and contestant on Dancing with the Stars, 136 West 130th Street
- S. Epatha Merkerson – actress
- Harold "Hal" Miller – actor ("Gordon" on Sesame Street), lived on 152nd Street & Macombs Place, before going to live and work in China, India and throughout Europe
- Miz Cracker – drag queen
- Mandy Patinkin – actor
- Oscar Peñas – composer and jazz guitarist, born in Barcelona, Spain; moved from Clinton Hill, Brooklyn, to Hamilton Heights, Harlem in 2018
- Adam Clayton Powell IV – New York City Council member
- Richard Price – novelist and screenwriter
- Alysia Reiner – actress and producer, best known for playing Natalie "Fig" Figueroa in the Netflix comedy drama series Orange Is the New Black (2013–2019), for which she won a Screen Actors Guild Award for her role as part of the ensemble cast
- Marcus Samuelsson – chef and restaurateur; lived in duplex near Frederick Douglass Boulevard
- Akhnaten Spencer-El – Olympic fencer
- Stephen Spinella – Tony Award-winning actor
- Joel Steinberg – killed his adopted daughter; moved to Harlem after his 2004 release from prison
- Khalid Yasin – born in Harlem; raised in Brooklyn; lives in England; preacher of Islam

=== Representatives ===
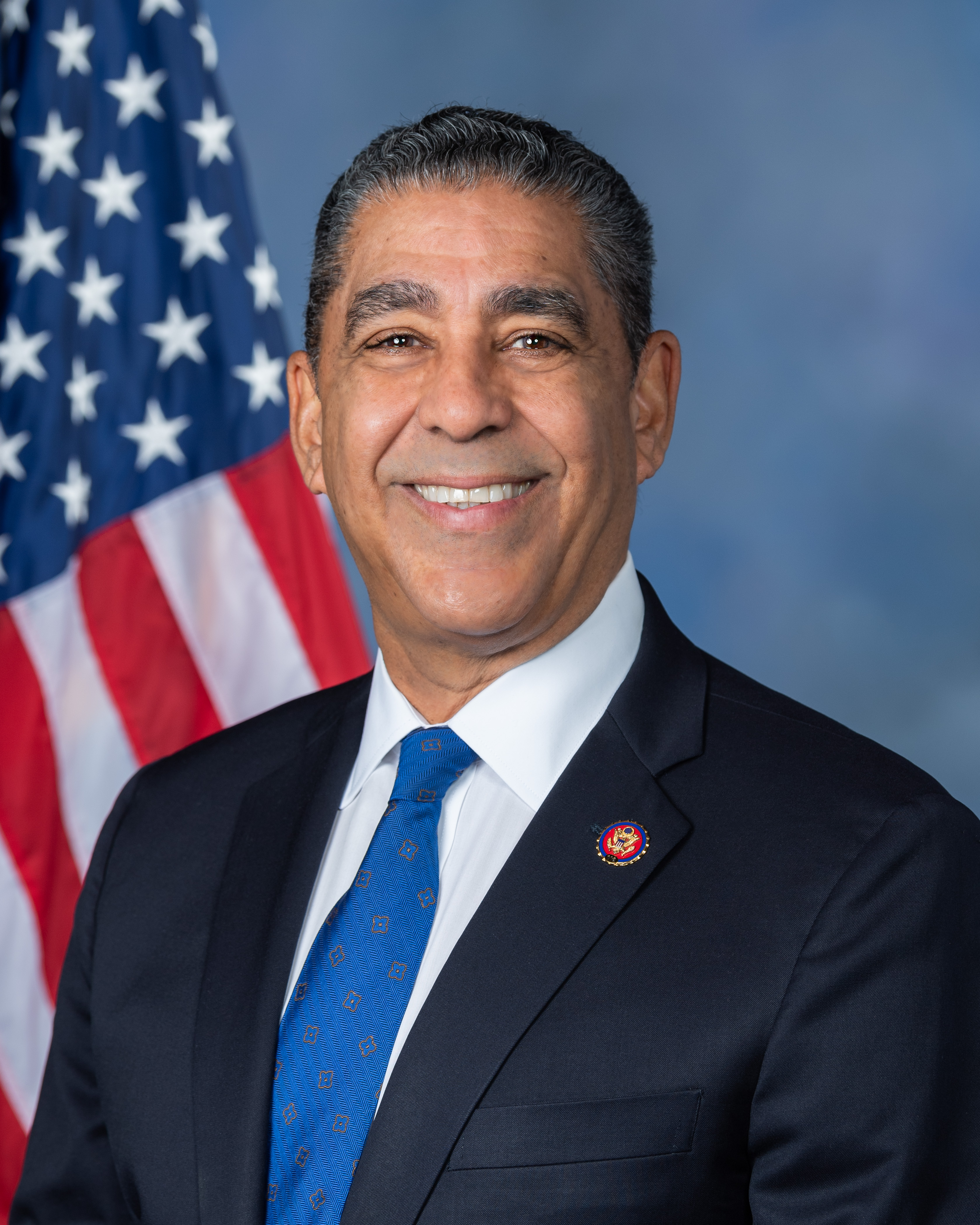
Adriano Espaillat

- Cordell Cleare – New York State Senator
- Adriano Espaillat – United States House of Representatives (2017–present)
- Robert Jackson – New York City council
- Bill Perkins – New York State Senator
- Adam Clayton Powell IV – New York State Assembly
- Charles B. Rangel – former U.S. House of Representatives, lived in Lenox Terrace at 132nd Street and Lenox Avenue
- José M. Serrano – New York State Senate
- Keith L.T. Wright – New York State Assembly
