= Charlene Dash =

African-American model

Charlene Dash is an African-American model. Dash is one of the models recognized by the 2011 Huffington Post Game Changer Awards. The awards honored African American models featured in the Versailles fashion show entitled The Battle of Versailles Fashion Show which was a fashion show held on November 28, 1973, in the Palace of Versailles in France. The fashion show was organized to raise money to restore the palace. Charlene Dash was among several models recognized including Pat Cleveland, Bethann Hardison, Billie Blair, Alva Chinn, Norma Jean Darden, Jennifer Brice, Barbara Jackson, China Machado, Ramona Saunders, and Amina Warsuma.

Dash was signed to the Ford Models agency in 1968 and appeared in cosmetics commercials for Clairol.
