= Norma Jean Darden =

Model recognized by the 2011 Huffington Post Game Changer Awards

- Occupations: Caterer, former model

Norma Jean Darden is a caterer and former model. She was recognized by the 2011 Huffington Post Game Changer Awards. The awards honored African American models featured in The Battle of Versailles Fashion Show which was a fashion show held on November 28, 1973, in the Palace of Versailles in Versailles, France. The fashion show was organized to raise money to restore the palace. Darden was among several models recognized, including Pat Cleveland, Bethann Hardison, Billie Blair, Alva Chinn, Charlene Dash, Jennifer Brice, Barbara Jackson, China Machado, Ramona Saunders, and Amina Warsuma.

Darden produced a 1978 cookbook, Spoonbread and Strawberry Wine, with her sister Carole Darden.
