= Amina Warsuma =

- Born: 1953 (age 72–73); New York City New York, U.S.
- Years active: 1970-present

Amina Warsuma (born 1953) is an American model, author, actress and film maker.

== Early life ==
Warsuma was born in the Bronx, New York to a Somali father and an American mother.

== Education ==
Warsuma graduated with an ASS degree from Monroe College in business in Bronx, New York. Warsuma attended UCLA for Television pilot writing class. Warsuma attained a degree in Cinema Production and Producing from LACC Cinema and Television Department in Los Angeles

== Career ==
=== Battle of Versailles ===
Warsuma was one of eleven black models that ran in the Battle of Versailles Fashion Show. The Fashion Show was held in 1973 at the Palace of Versailles raising $280,000 for the restoration of the palace. The other black models were Pat Cleveland, Bethann Hardison, Billie Blair, Jennifer Brice, Alva Chinn, Norma Jean Darden, Charlene Dash, Barbara Jackson, China Machado and Ramona Saunder. The show pitted five established French designers against five emerging American designers.

The show use of eleven African-American models was unprecedented at the time and marked a new direction in fashion runways.

== Awards ==
In 2011, Warsuma alongside the other ten African-Americans models received the Huffington Post Game Changer Awards for their role in the Battle of Versailles Fashion Show. The award was presented by Gayle King.

The Metropolitan Museum of Art honoured Warsuma and the other 10 models in 2011 with a special luncheon.
