= Model (person) =

Person serving as a visual aid

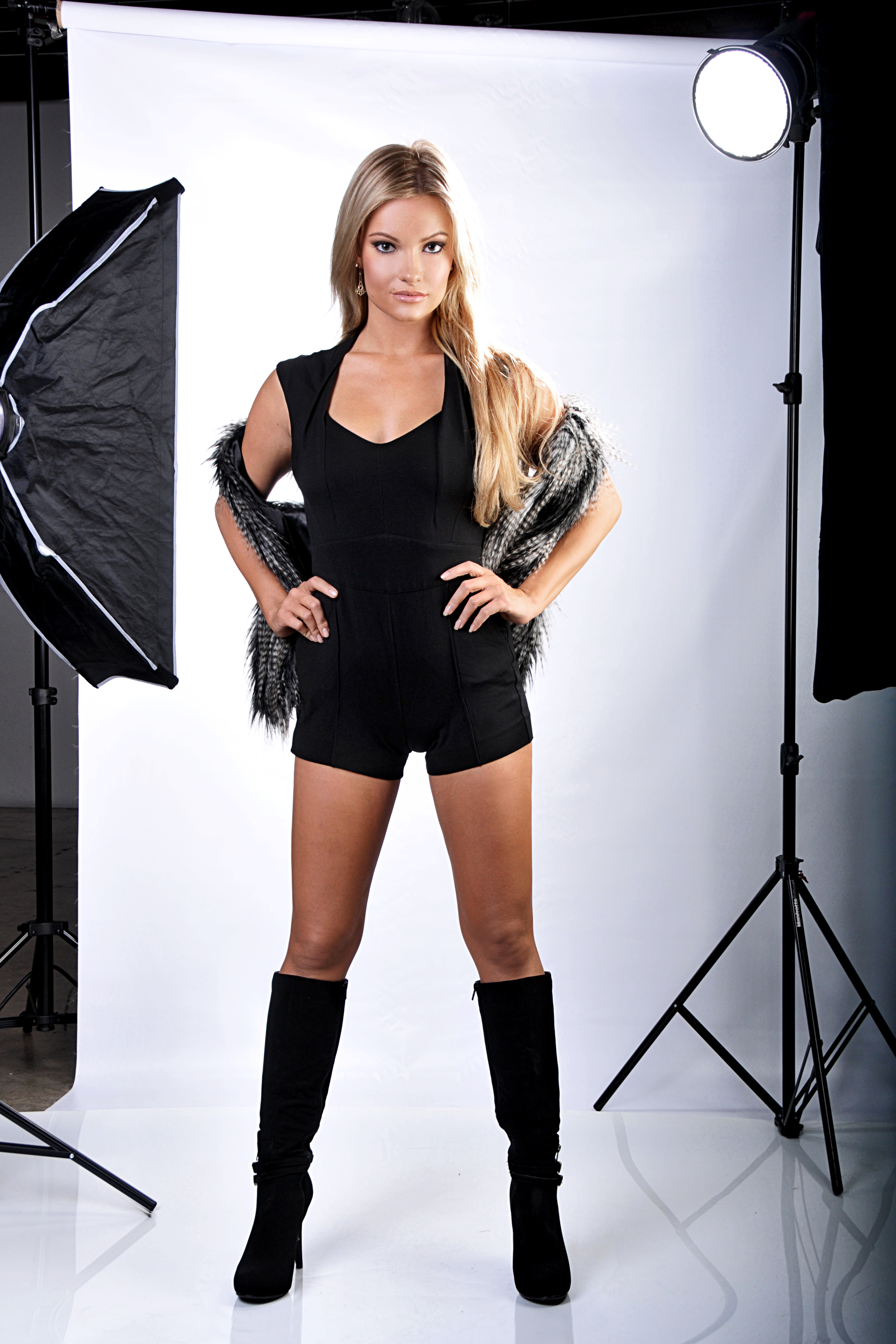
Caitlin O'Connor posing on a typical studio shooting set

A model is a person with a role either to display commercial products (notably fashion clothing in fashion shows) or to serve as an artist's model.

Modelling ("modeling" in American English) entails using one's body to represent someone else's body or someone's artistic imagination of a body. For example, a woman modelling for shoes uses her foot to model the potential customers' feet. Modelling thus is different from posing for portrait photography, portrait painting, and distinct from other types of public performance, such as acting or dancing. Personal opinions are normally not expressed, and a model's reputation and image are considered critical.

Types of modelling include: fine art, fashion, glamour, fitness, and body-part promotional modelling. Models are featured in various media formats, including books, magazines, films, newspapers, the Internet, and television. Fashion modelling is sometimes featured in reality TV shows, such as the Top Model franchise. Modelling often is a part-time activity.

== Artists' models ==
Artists' models pose for any visual artist as part of the creative process. Although sometimes friends or relatives, artists' models are more often paid professionals who provide a reference or inspiration for a work of art that includes the human figure. The most common types of art created using models are figure drawing, figure painting, sculpture and photography, but almost any medium may be used. Although commercial motives dominate over aesthetics in illustration, its artwork commonly employs models. Models are most frequently employed for art classes or by informal groups of experienced artists who gather to share the expense of a model.

== Fashion modelling ==
=== History of fashion modelling ===
==== Early years ====
In 14th-century Europe, fashion had been displayed in miniature form to (often royal) clients by fashion dolls, before the clothes were made in human size.

Modelling as a profession was first established in 1853 by Charles Frederick Worth, the "father of haute couture", when he asked his wife, Marie Vernet Worth, to model the potential clients for the clothes he designed. The term "house model" was coined to describe this type of work. Eventually, this became common practice for Parisian fashion houses where such women were called mannequins, a meaning of that word adopted and retained in British English in the 1880s then used less commonly after World War II. There were no standard physical measurement requirements for a model, and most designers would use women of varying sizes to demonstrate variety in their designs.

The modelling profession expanded to photo modelling with the development of fashion photography. Models remained fairly anonymous, and relatively poorly paid, until the late 1940s, when the world's first three supermodels, Barbara Goalen, Bettina Graziani and Lisa Fonssagrives began commanding very large sums. During the 1940s and 1950s, Graziani was the most photographed woman in France and the undisputed queen of couture, while Fonssagrives appeared on over 200 Vogue covers; her name recognition led to the importance of Vogue in shaping the careers of fashion models. One of the most popular models during the 1940s was Jinx Falkenburg, who was paid $25 per hour, a large sum at the time; through the 1950s, Wilhelmina Cooper, Jean Patchett, Dovima, Dorian Leigh, Suzy Parker, Evelyn Tripp and Carmen Dell'Orefice also dominated fashion. Dorothea Church was among the first black models in the industry to gain recognition in Paris. However, these models were unknown outside the fashion community. Wilhelmina Cooper's measurements were 38"-24"-36" whereas Chanel Iman's measurements are 32"-23"-33". In 1946, Ford Models was established by Eileen and Gerard Ford in New York, making it one of the oldest model agencies in the world.

==== The 1960s and the beginning of the industry ====
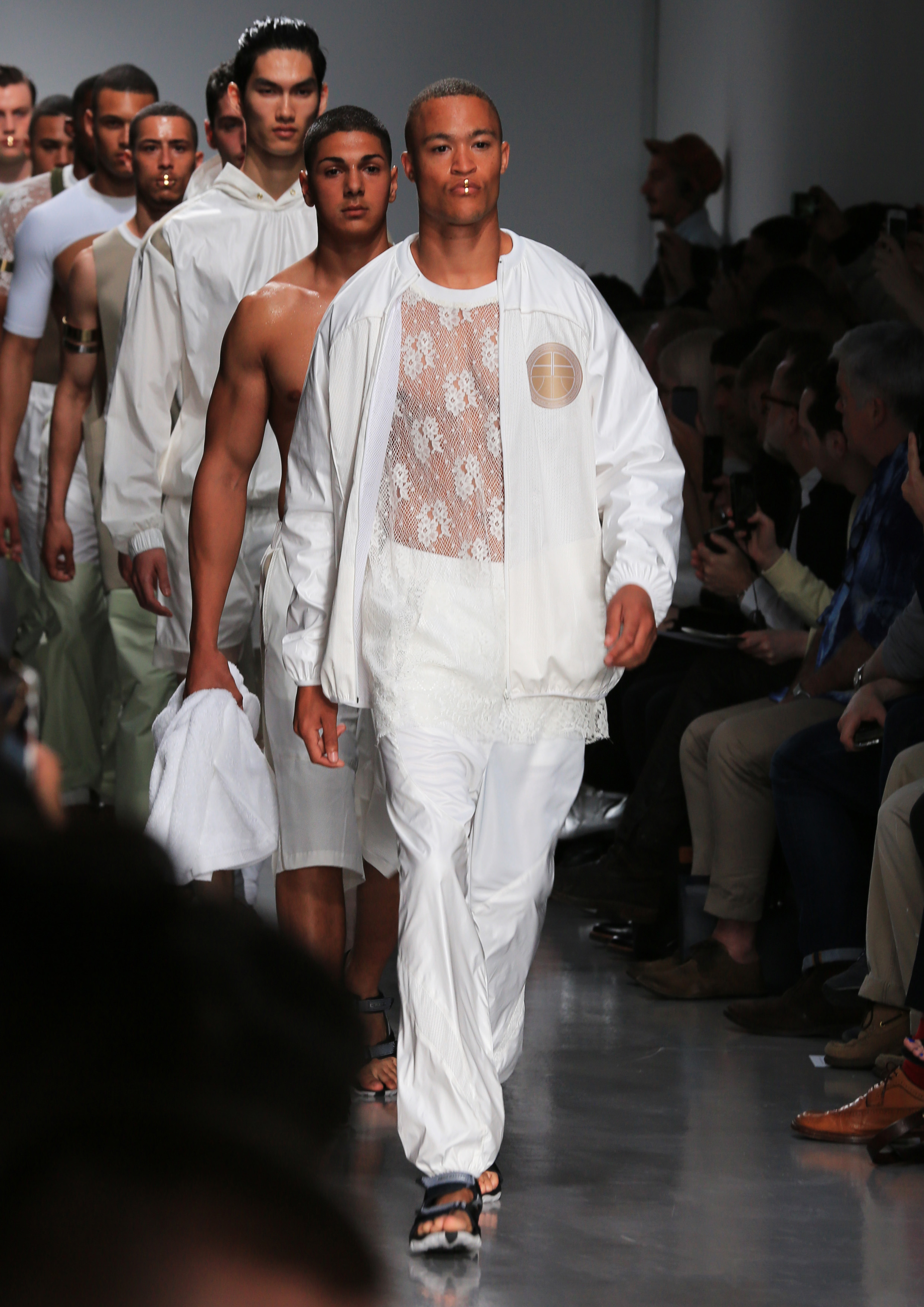
Models on runway at a fashion show

In the 1960s, the modelling world established modelling agencies. Throughout Europe, secretarial services acted as models' agents charging them weekly rates for their messages and bookings. For the most part, models were responsible for their own billing. In Germany, agents were not allowed to work for a percentage of a person's earnings, so they referred to themselves as secretaries. Except for a few models travelling to Paris or New York, travelling was relatively unheard of for a model. Most models only worked in one market due to different labour laws governing modelling in various countries. In the 1960s, Italy had many fashion houses and fashion magazines but desperately needed models. Italian agencies often coerced models to return to Italy without work visas by withholding their pay. They would also pay their models in cash, which models would have to hide from customs agents. It was not uncommon for models staying in hotels such as La Louisiana in Paris or the Arena in Milan to have their hotel rooms raided by the police looking for their work visas. It was rumoured that competing agencies were behind the raids. This led many agencies to form worldwide chains; for example, the Marilyn Agency has branches in Paris and New York.

By the late 1960s, London was considered the best market in Europe due to its more organised and innovative approach to modelling. It was during this period that models began to become household names. Models such as Jean Shrimpton, Tania Mallet, Celia Hammond, Twiggy, and Penelope Tree dominated the London fashion scene and were well paid, unlike their predecessors. Twiggy became The Face of '66 at the age of 16. At this time, model agencies were not as restrictive about the models they represented, although it was uncommon for them to sign shorter models. Twiggy, who stood at 5 feet 6 inches (168 cm) with a 32" bust and had a boy's haircut, is credited with changing model ideals. At that time, she earned £80 (equivalent to £1,710.77 or US$2,186.53 in 2024) an hour, while the average wage was £15 (equivalent to £320.77 or US$409.97 in 2024) a week.

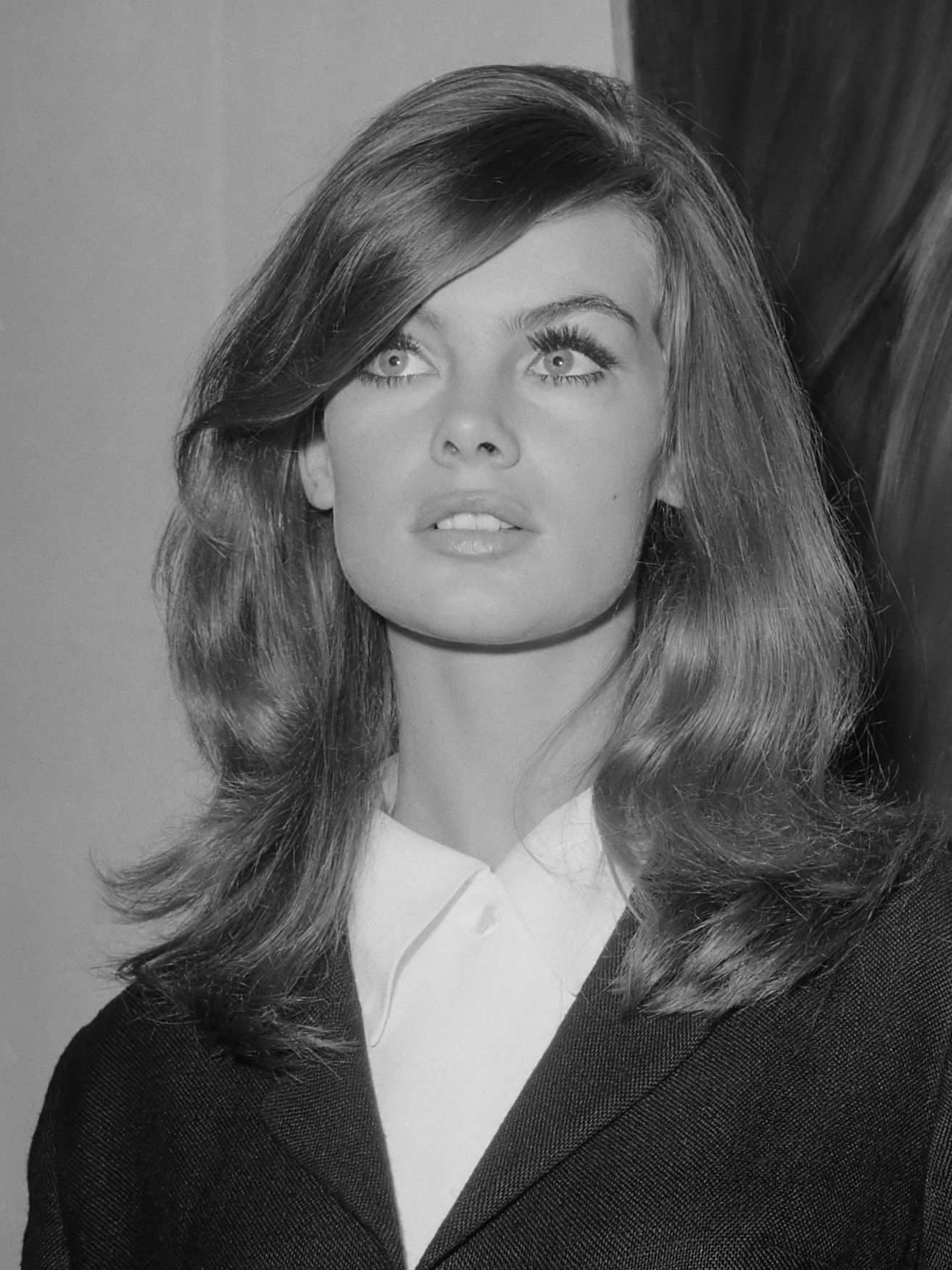
Jean Shrimpton in 1965

In 1967, seven of the top model agents in London formed the Association of London Model Agents. The formation of this association helped legitimise modelling and changed the fashion industry. Even with a more professional attitude towards modelling, models were still expected to have their hair and makeup done before they arrived at a shoot. Meanwhile, agencies took responsibility for a model's promotional materials and branding. That same year, former top fashion model Wilhelmina Cooper opened up her own fashion agency with her husband called Wilhelmina Models. By 1968, FM Agency and Models 1 were established and represented models in a similar way that agencies do today. By the late 1960s, models were treated better and were making better wages. One of the innovators, Ford Models, was the first agency to advance models money they were owed and would often allow teen models, who did not live locally, to reside in their house, a precursor to model housing.

==== The 1970s and 1980s ====
The innovations of the 1960s flowed into the 1970s fashion scene. As a result of model industry associations and standards, model agencies became more business minded, and more thought went into a model's promotional materials. By this time, agencies were starting to pay for a model's publicity. In the early 1970s, Scandinavia had many tall, leggy, blonde-haired, blue-eyed models and not enough clients. It was during this time that Ford Models pioneered scouting. They would spend time working with agencies holding modeling contests. This was the precursor to the Ford Models Supermodel of the World competition, established in 1980. Ford also focused its attention on Brazil, which had a wide array of seemingly "exotic" models, which eventually led to the establishment of Ford Models Brazil. During this time, the Sports Illustrated Swimsuit Issue debuted. The magazine set the trend by photographing "bigger and healthier" California models, and printing their names by their photos, thus turning many of them into household names and establishing the issue as a hallmark of supermodel status.

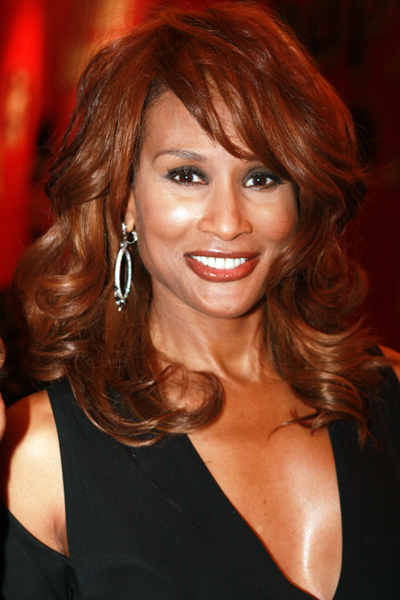
Beverly Johnson in 2007

The 1970s marked numerous milestones in fashion. Beverly Johnson was the first black woman to appear on the cover of U.S. Vogue in 1974. Models, including Iman, Grace Jones, Pat Cleveland, Alva Chinn, Donyale Luna, Minah Bird, Naomi Sims, and Toukie Smith were some of the top black fashion models who paved the way for black women in fashion. In 1975, Margaux Hemingway landed a then-unprecedented million-dollar contract as the face of Fabergé's Babe perfume and the same year appeared on the cover of Time magazine, labeled one of the "New Beauties", giving further name recognition to fashion models.

Many of the world's most prominent modeling agencies were established in the 1970s and early 1980s. These agencies created the standard by which agencies now run. In 1974, Nevs Models was established in London with only a men's board, the first of its kind. Elite Models was founded in Paris in 1975, as well as Friday's Models in Japan. The next year Cal-Carries was established in Singapore, the first of a chain of agencies in Asia. In 1977, Select Model Management and Why Not Models in Milan opened its doors. By the 1980s, agencies such as Premier Model Management, Storm Models, Mikas, Marilyn, and Metropolitan Models had been established.

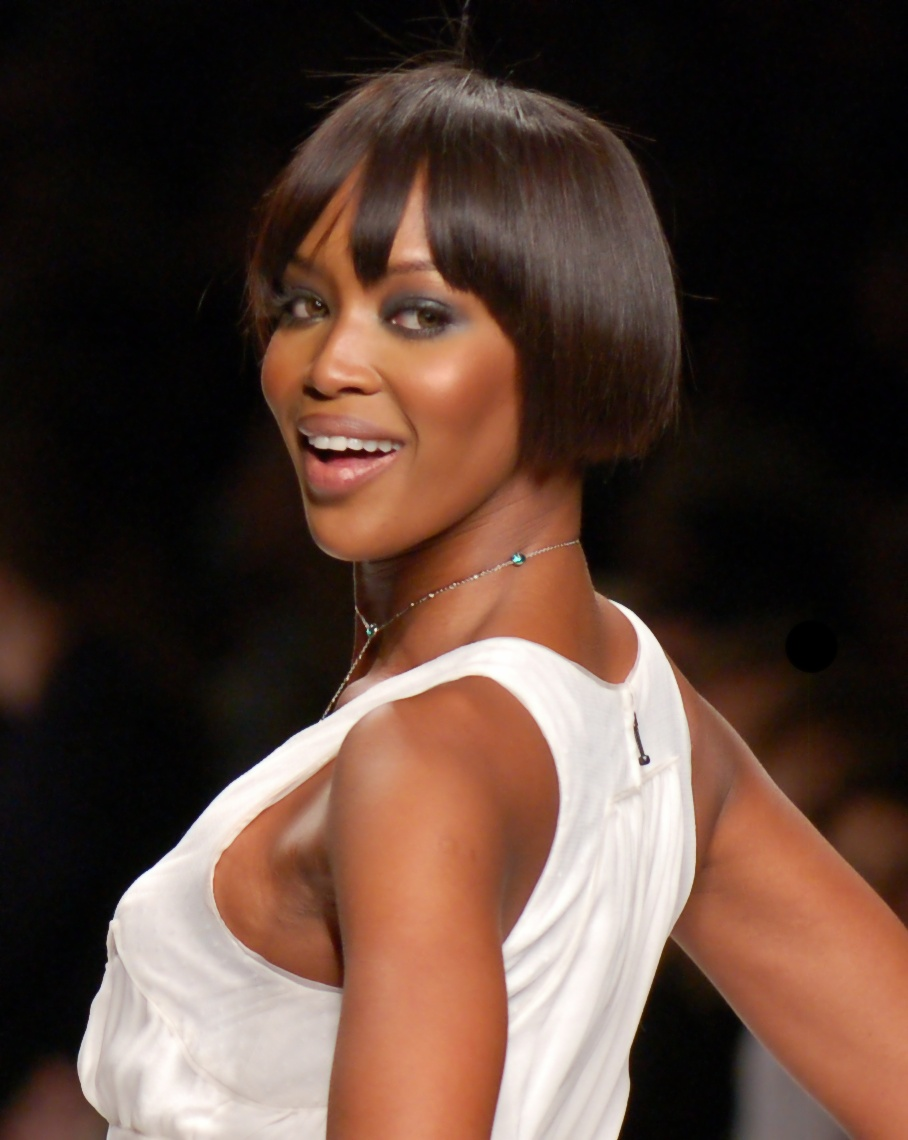
Naomi Campbell, one of the most famous supermodels

In October 1981, Life cited Shelley Hack, Lauren Hutton and Iman for Revlon, Margaux Hemingway for Fabergé, Karen Graham for Estée Lauder, Cristina Ferrare for Max Factor, and Cheryl Tiegs for CoverGirl by proclaiming them the "million dollar faces" of the beauty industry. These models negotiated previously unheard-of lucrative and exclusive deals with giant cosmetics companies, were instantly recognizable, and their names became well known to the public.

By the 1980s, most models could make modeling a full-time career. Patti Hansen, one of the top earning models in 1980, earned $200 an hour for print and $2,000 for television plus residuals; it was estimated that she earned about $300,000 a year in 1980 (equivalent to $982,580 in 2025). It was common for models to travel abroad and work throughout Europe. As modeling became global, numerous agencies began to think globally. In 1980, Ford Models, the innovator of scouting, introduced the Ford Models Supermodel of the World contest. That same year, John Casablancas opened Elite Models in New York. In 1981, cosmetics companies began contracting top models to lucrative endorsement deals. By 1983, Elite had developed its own contest, the Elite Model Look competition. In New York, during the 1980s there were so-called "model wars" in which the Ford and Elite agencies fought over models and campaigns. Models were jumping back and forth between agencies such Elite, Wilhelmina, and Ford. In New York, the late 1980s trend was the boyish look in which models had short cropped hair and looked androgynous. In Europe, the trend was the exact opposite. During this time, many American models who were considered more feminine-looking moved abroad. By the mid-1980s, big hair was made popular by some musical groups, and the boyish look was out. The hourglass figure, a fashionable trend from the late 1940s to the early 1960s, made a comeback.

==== 1990s ====
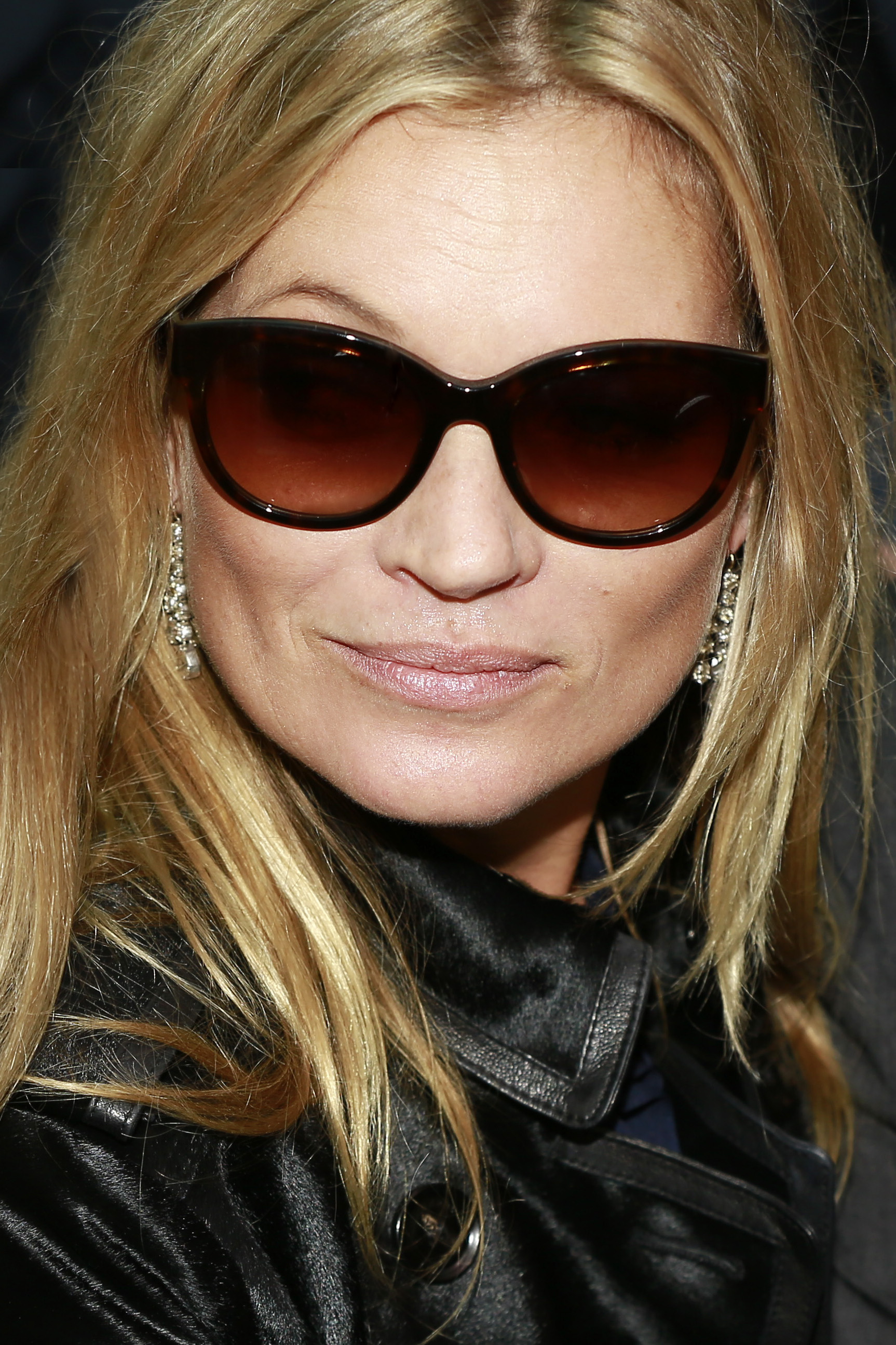
Kate Moss, part of the heroin chic trend

The high fashion models of the late 1980s dominated the early 1990s. In 1990, Linda Evangelista famously said to Vogue, "we don't wake up for less than $10,000 a day". Evangelista and her contemporaries, Naomi Campbell, Cindy Crawford, Christy Turlington, Tatjana Patitz, Stephanie Seymour, and Yasmeen Ghauri became arguably the most recognisable models in the world, earning the moniker of "supermodel", and were boosted to global recognition and new heights of wealth for the industry. In 1991, Turlington signed a contract with Maybelline that paid her $800,000 for twelve days' work each year.

By the mid‑1990s, the new "heroin chic" trend became popular amongst New York and London editorial clients. Kate Moss became its poster child through her ads for Calvin Klein. Moss' friend, socialite Annabelle Neilson, was becoming increasingly well known at this time. With the popularity of lingerie retailer Victoria's Secret, and the Sports Illustrated Swimsuit Issue, there was a need for healthier-looking supermodels such as Tyra Banks and Heidi Klum to meet commercial modelling demand. The mid‑1990s also saw many Asian countries establishing modelling agencies.

By the late 1990s, the heroin chic era had run its course. Teen-inspired clothing infiltrated mainstream fashion, teen pop music was on the rise, and artists such as Britney Spears, Aaliyah and Christina Aguilera popularised pleather and bare midriffs. As fashion changed to a more youthful demographic, the models who rose to fame had to be sexier for the digital age. Following Gisele Bündchen's breakthrough, a wave of Brazilian models including Adriana Lima and Alessandra Ambrosio rose to fame on runways and became popular in commercial modelling throughout the 2000s. Some have tied this increase in Brazilian models to the trend of magazines featuring celebrities instead of models on their covers.

==== 2000s and since ====
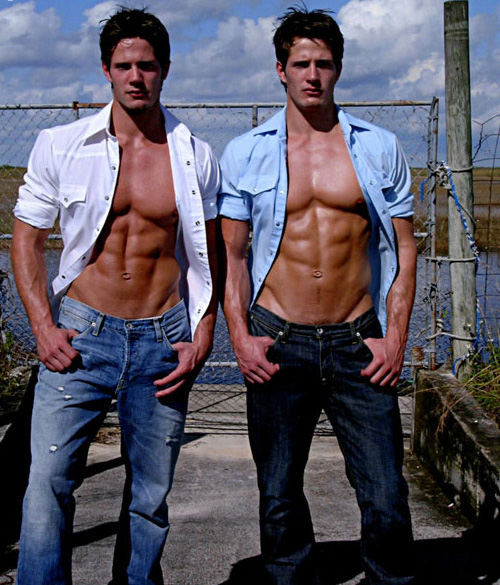
The identical Carlson twins in 2006

In the late 2000s, the Brazilians fell out of favour on the runways. Editorial clients were favouring models with a china-doll or alien look to them, such as Gemma Ward and Lily Cole. During the 2000s, Ford Models and NEXT Model Management were engaged in a legal battle, with each agency alleging that the other was stealing its models.

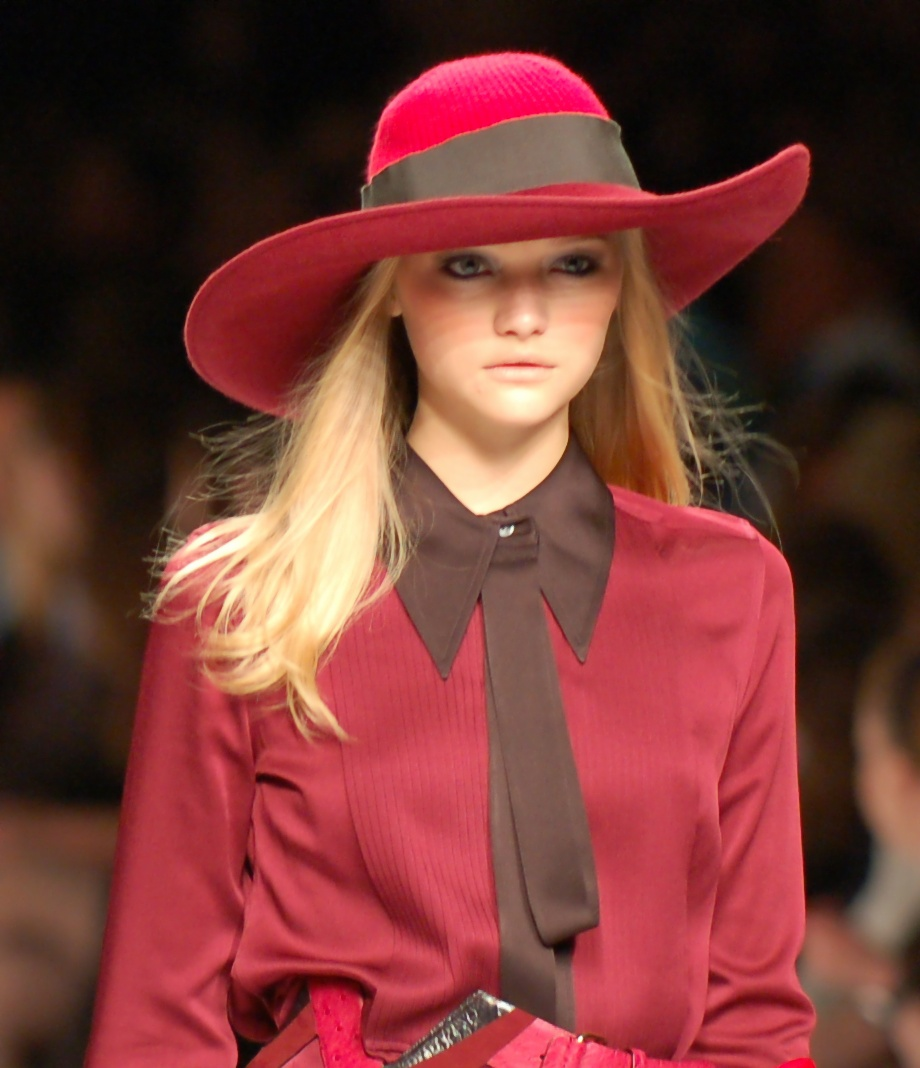
Gemma Ward, an Australian model

However, the most significant controversy of the 2000s was the health of high-fashion models participating in fashion week. While the health of models had been a concern since the 1970s, there were several high-profile news stories surrounding the deaths of young fashion models due to eating disorders and drug abuse. The British Fashion Council subsequently asked designers to sign a contract stating they would not use models under the age of sixteen. On March 3, 2012, Vogue banned models under the age of sixteen as well as models who appeared to have an eating disorder. Similarly, other countries placed bans on unhealthy, and underage models, including Spain, Italy, Israel and France, which all enacted a minimum body mass index (BMI) requirement. The French law also requires digitally altered pictures of models to be identified as such.

In 2013, New York toughened its child labour law protections for models under the age of eighteen by passing New York Senate Bill No. 5486, which gives underage models the same labour protections afforded to child actors. Key new protections included the following: underage models are not to work before 5:00 pm or after 10:00 pm on school nights, nor were they to work later than 12:30 am on non-school nights; the models may not return to work less than twelve hours after they leave; a pediatric nurse must be on-site; an adult chaperone must accompany models under sixteen; parents or guardians of underage models must create a trust fund account into which employers will transfer a minimum of 15% of the child model's gross earnings; and employers must set aside time and a dedicated space for educational instruction.

=== Runway modelling ===
Catwalk or runway models, also called live models, display clothes from fashion designers, fashion media, and consumers. During runway shows, models have to constantly change clothes and makeup. Models walk, turn, and stand to demonstrate a garment's key features. Models also go to interviews (called "go and sees") to present their portfolios. A runway model can also work in other areas, such as department store fashion shows, and the most successful models sometimes create their own product lines or go into acting.

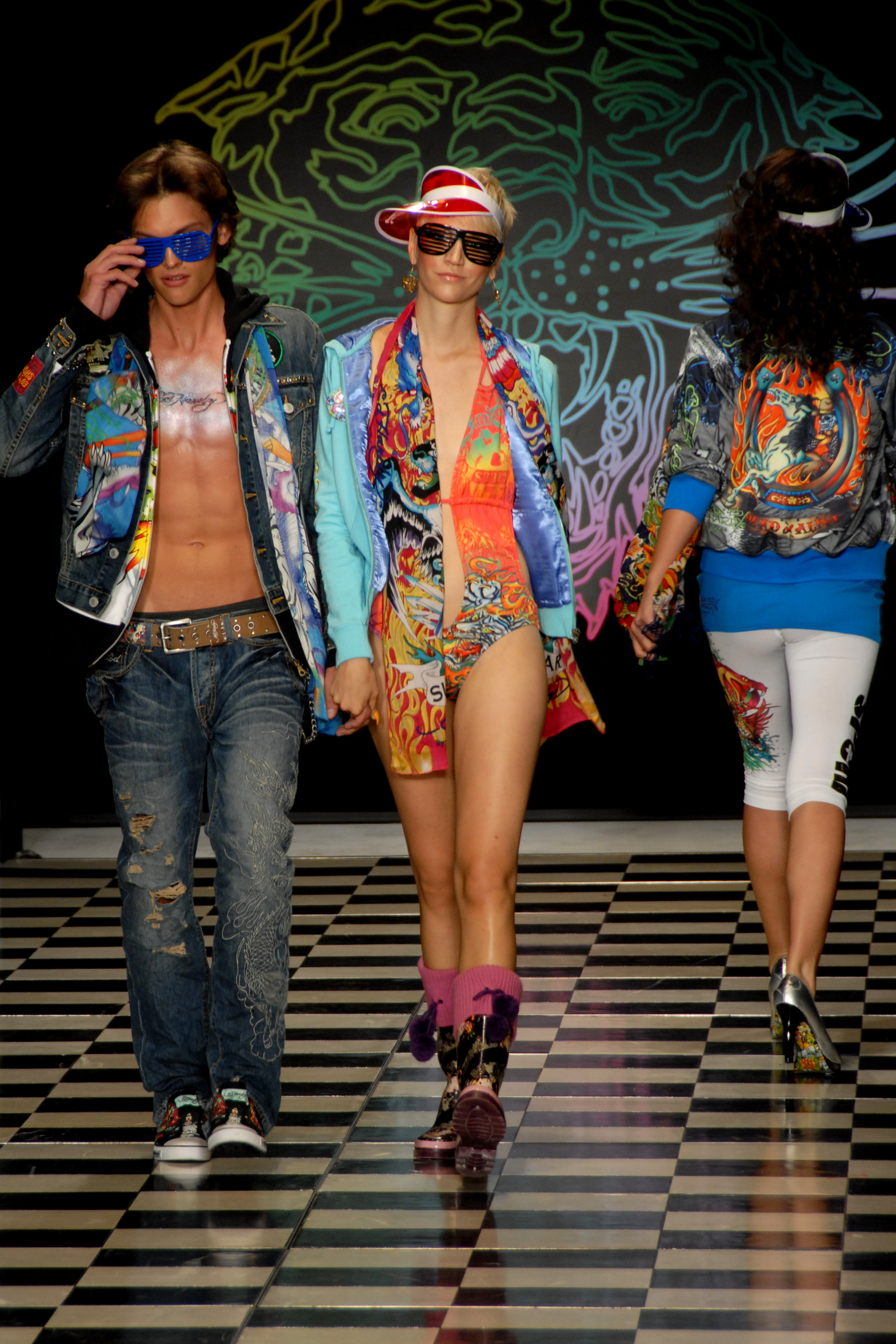
Fashion models on the runway during Los Angeles Fashion Week, 2008

Top runway models travel around the world to attend fashion shows. The most prestigious events are held in New York City, London, Paris, and Milan. The criteria for runway models include certain height and weight requirements. The British Association of Model Agents (AMA) says that female models should be around 34"-24"-34" and between 5 ft 8 in (173 cm) and 5 ft 11 in (180 cm) tall. The average model is very slender. Those not meeting the size requirement may try to become a plus-size model. According to the New York Better Business Career Services website, the preferred dimensions for a male model are a height of 5 ft 11 in (180 cm) to 6 ft 2 in (188 cm), a waist of 26–32 in (66–81 cm) and a chest measurement of 39–40 in (99–102 cm). Male runway models are notably skinny and well toned.

Male and female models must also possess clear skin, healthy hair, and attractive facial features. Stringent weight and body proportion guidelines form the selection criteria by which established, and would‑be, models are judged for their placement suitability, on an ongoing basis. There can be some variation regionally, and by market tier, subject to current prevailing trends at any point, in any era, by agents, agencies and end-clients.

Formerly, the required measurements for models were 35"-23.5"-35" in (90-60-90 cm), the alleged measurements of Marilyn Monroe. Today's fashion models tend to have measurements closer to the AMA-recommended shape, but some – such as Afghan model Zohre Esmaeli – still have 35"-23.5"-35" measurements. Although in some fashion centres, a size 00 is more desirable than a size 0.

The often thin shape of many fashion models has been criticised for warping girls' body image and encouraging eating disorders. Organisers of a fashion show in Madrid in September 2006 turned away models who were judged to be underweight by medical personnel who were on hand. In February 2007 a Uruguayan model, Luisel Ramos, died from heart problems secondary to malnutrition. Her sister Eliana Ramos also was a model and had died immediately after a runway show several months prior. They were amongst the three fashion models to die of malnutrition in a six-month span. The other victim was Ana Carolina Reston. Luisel Ramos died of heart failure caused by anorexia nervosa just after stepping off the catwalk. In 2015, France passed a law requiring models to be declared healthy by a doctor to participate in fashion shows. The law also requires re-touched images to be marked as such in magazines.

=== Magazine modelling ===
Fashion modelling also includes modelling clothing in fashion magazines. In Japan, there are different types of fashion magazine models. Exclusive models (専属モデル, senzoku moderu) are models who regularly appear in a fashion magazine and model exclusively for it. On the other hand, street models, or "reader models" (読者モデル, dokusha moderu; abbreviated as "dokumo" for short), are amateur models who model part-time for fashion magazines in conjunction to school work and their main jobs. Unlike professional models, street models are meant to represent the average person in appearance and do not appear on runways. Street models are not exclusively contracted to fashion magazines. If a street model is popular enough, some become exclusive models. Many fashion icons and musicians in Japan began their careers as street models, including Kaela Kimura and Kyary Pamyu Pamyu.

=== Plus-size ===
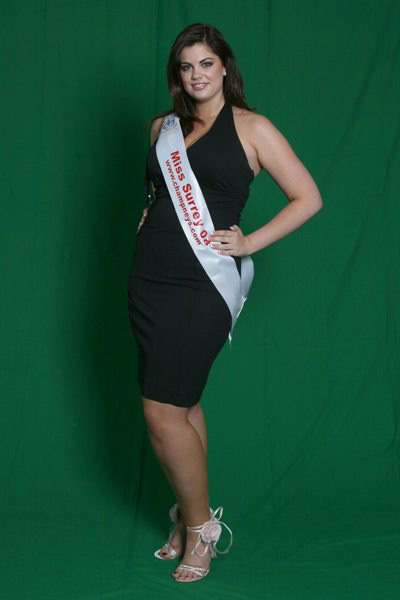
Chloe Marshall, a size 16, is considered a plus-size model.

Plus-size models are models who generally have larger measurements than editorial fashion models, and are not necessarily overweight. The primary use of plus-size models is to appear in advertising and runway shows for plus-size labels. Plus-size models are also engaged in work not strictly related to selling large-sized clothing, e.g., stock photography and advertising photography for cosmetics, household and pharmaceutical products and sunglasses, footwear and watches. Therefore, plus-size models do not exclusively wear garments marketed as plus-size clothing. This is especially true when participating in fashion editorials for mainstream fashion magazines. Some plus-size models have appeared in runway shows and campaigns for mainstream retailers and designers such as Gucci, Guess, Jean-Paul Gaultier, Levi's and Versace Jeans.

=== Normal-size ===
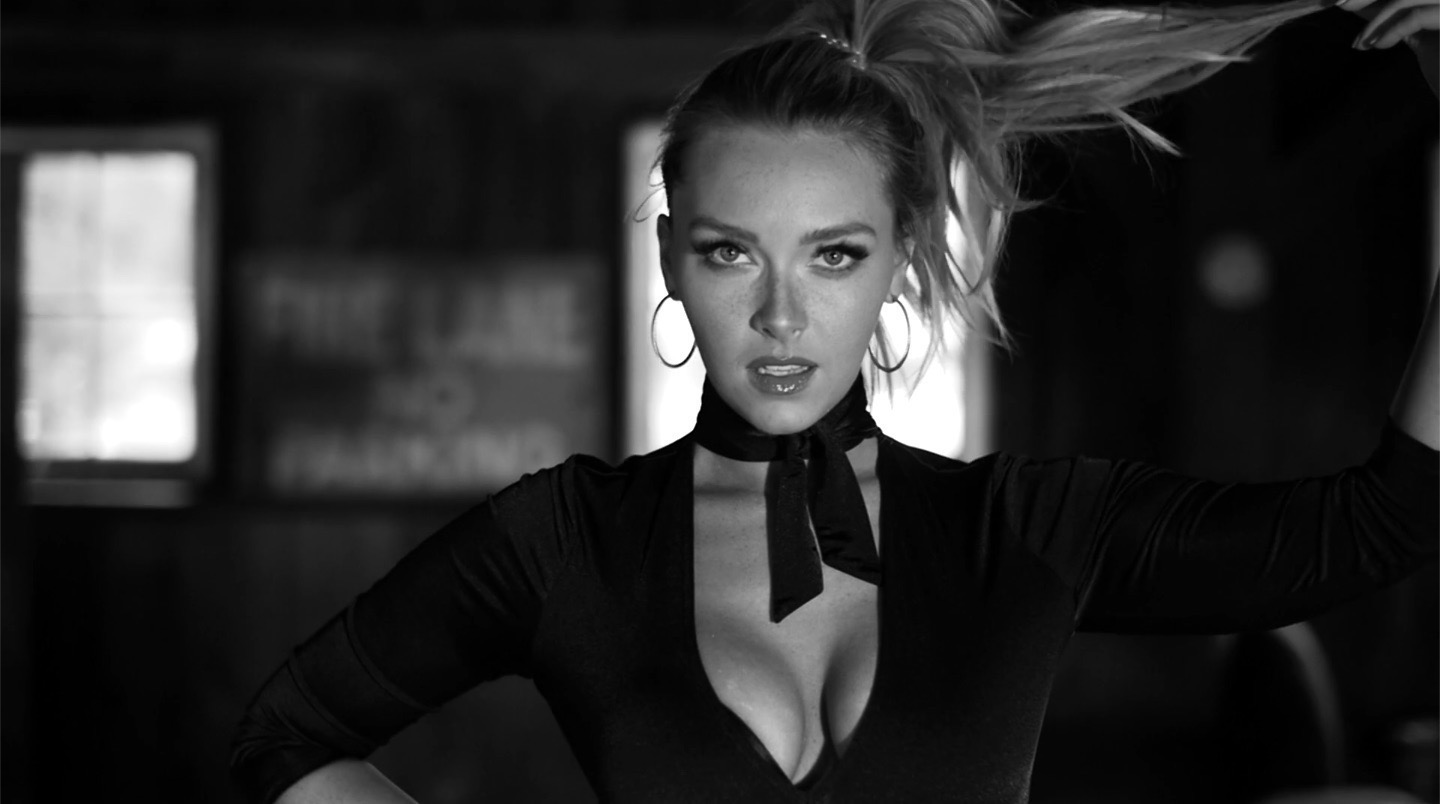
Camille Kostek is a normal-size or "middle model" at size 4/6.

Also known as the "in-between" and "middle models", they are neither considered catalogue size (0–2) nor plus-size (10 up). There is criticism that these models have been left out of the conversation because fashion companies and brands opt to employ the extremes of the spectrum.

Model Camille Kostek who was on a solo cover of Sports Illustrated Swimsuit Issue in 2019 has stated that she was told by a well-known international modelling agency "...that it was too bad that I wasn't a size 10. That plus size is a big market right now and it's too bad I wasn't measuring bigger. My size (4/6) is considered an "in-between size", meaning I'm not a straight model nor plus model, I'm right in the middle. Actress Mindy Kaling has described this body type in her 2011 book Is Everybody Hanging Out Without Me? writing, "Since I am not model-skinny, but also not super-fat... I fall into that nebulous, 'Normal American Woman Size' that legions of fashion stylists detest... Many stylists hate that size because, I think, to them, I lack the self-discipline to be an aesthetic, or the sassy confidence to be a total fatty hedonist. They're like, 'Pick a lane.'"

=== Black models ===
The arrival of black women modelling as a profession began in early postwar America. It started most notably from the need of advertisers and a rise of black photography magazines. The women who advanced in such careers were those in a middle-class system emphasising the conservative value of marriage, motherhood, and domesticity. Originally titled the "Brownskin" model, black women refined the social, sexual, and racial realities confined in the gender expectations of the modelling world. There was a profound need for black women to partake in the advertising process for the new "Negro Market". With the help of Branford Models, the first black agency, 1946 was the beginning of the black modelling era. Branford Models' was able to "overturn the barriers facing African Americans in the early postwar period", especially by lifting at least one economic freedom. In this postwar America, the demand for such presence in magazines advanced "as a stage for models to display consumer goods" while assisting "in constructing a new visual discourse of urban middle-class African America". In March 1966, Donyale Luna became the first Black model to appear on the cover of the British edition of Vogue.

While they represented diversity, a major gap in the fashion industry, it was only until the 1970s that black models had a substantial presence in the modelling world. Known as the "Black is Beautiful" movement, the 1970s became the era of the black model. With growing disenfranchisement and racial inequality, the United States recognised the urgency of opening the "doors of social access and visibility to black Americans". The world of fashion was the gateway for social change. "The world of fashion was similarly looked to as a place where the culture could find signs of racial progress. Expressions of beauty and glamour mattered. Good race relations required taking note of who was selling women lipsticks and mini skirts, which meant that advertisers began looking for black models" Black models were looked to as the vehicle of social change. They were given the opportunity to balance out the lack of presence of black individuals in the mainstream culture. Agencies were beginning to scout black models and focus on the social change they were contributing to. Life magazine in October 1969, covered their issue with Naomi Sims, one of the most influential black models in the industry. Her rise to fame led to her being hired by international magazines and working on individual projects with designers across the globe. In the Life Magazine issue, Black Beauty, a new agency that represented black models, had a spread in the magazine that showcased 39 black models. Each one of the models had unique features, allowing black expression to progress through this historic magazine spread.

With the movement's presence both in magazines and on the runway, designers began to realise the need to include black models on their runways and advertisements. The Battle of Versailles was one of the most notable moments in fashion history that put black models on the map. Eleanor Lambert, creator of Fashion Week and a major "[controller] of the narrative of American fashion", set up a dinner and a fundraiser to both increase American fashion visibility and restore the palace of Versailles. Five French designers and five American designers battled it out on the runway, showing off the fashion, and for the Americans, black models as well. Oscar de la Renta stated "it was the black models that had made the difference." Pat Cleveland, Bethann Hardison, Billie Blair, Jennifer Brice, Alva Chinn, and Ramona Saunders, were among the many black models that helped Team America win and stun the French competition. This competition made the black model a worldwide phenomenon. The French were beginning to welcome diversity on the runway and in their advertising. With the recognition Versailles had given, black presence in the modelling world carried out into the 1980s and the 1990s. The models were now known by name and the publicity that came with the designers they were modelling for. With the rise of the supermodel, models like Naomi Campbell and Tyra Banks paved the way for black success. Naomi Campbell, born in London, was the first black model to cover American Vogue, TIME magazine, Russian Vogue, and the first British black model to cover British vogue. Brands like Chanel, Louis Vitton, Balmain, Prada, and more have all featured Campbell in their campaigns. She used her remarkable success to achieve more than fashion excellence.

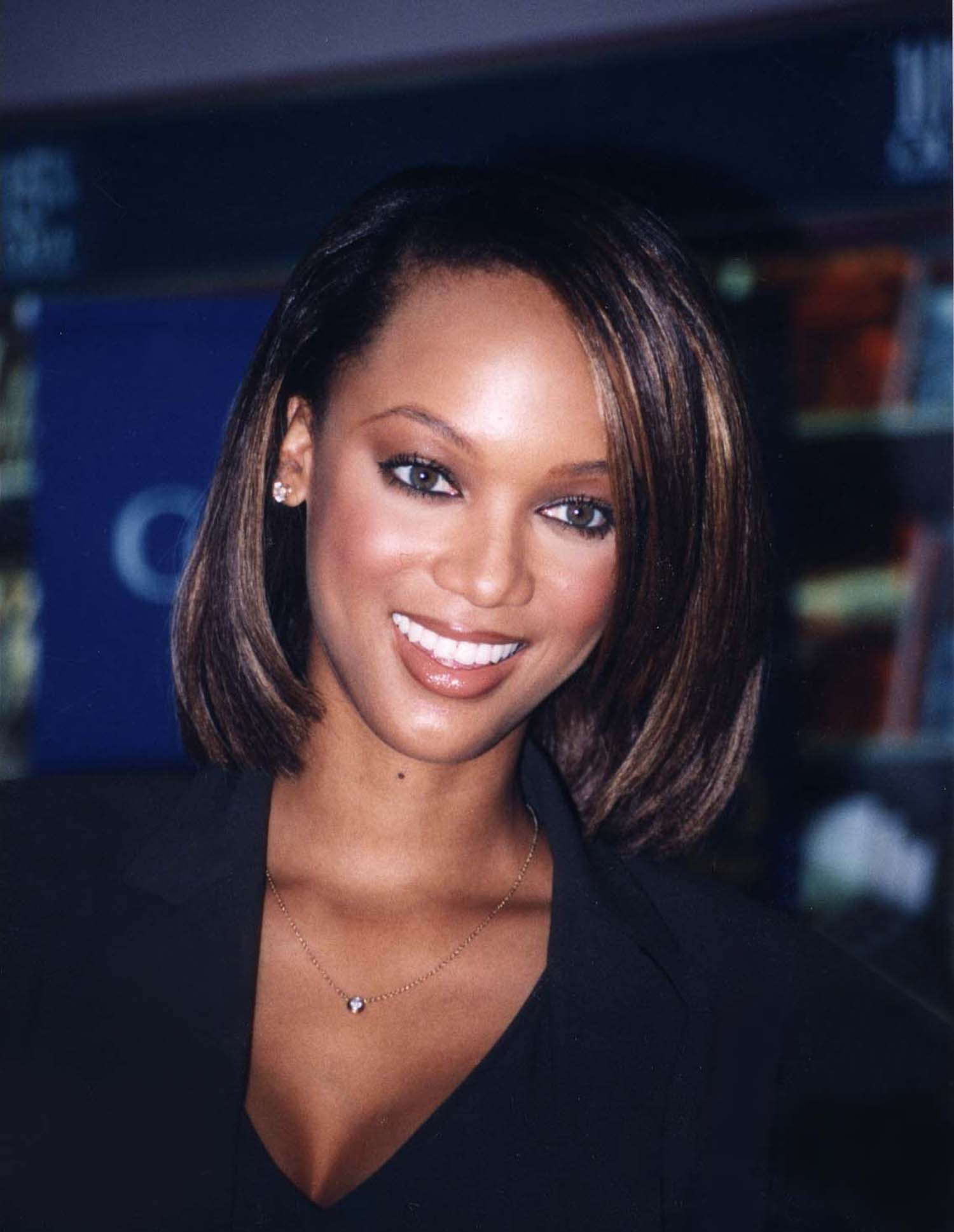
Tyra Banks (1995)

By the mid-1990s, black presence in the modelling world had dramatically decreased. Designers began to favour a consistent aesthetic and elected for skinnier white models. This reality was paved by models such as Kate Moss and Stella Tennant, who provided a more consistent look for the runway. At this time, "the number of working black models in high-profile runway presentation... became so dire that stories began appearing in the mainstream media about the whitewashing of the runway". In response, models like Campbell, Iman, and Bethann Hardison, joined forces throughout the"Diversity Coalition" in an attempt to "call out and accuse prominent fashion houses for snubbing Black and Asian models on the catwalk, editorial spreads, and campaigns". The lack of representation was, in part, due to the belief that "black girls don't push products", which "encouraged people who work directly and indirectly in the industry to speak out on the injustices that go on within it". In the 1990s, it was quite clear that the top designers simply preferred a new aesthetic that excluded models of colour, which resulted in only 6% of runway models to be women of colour. Campbell's Diversity Coalition's primary mission was to "expedite inclusion on the runway by deliberately calling out designers who have executed acts of racism on the runway". According to Campbell, it was their choice to not include black models on the runway and desire a uniformed runway that resulted in a racist act. Although such a dramatic effort to exclude black presence from the fashion world, models like Tyra Banks and Veronica Webb persisted. Banks not only dominated the runway as a teen, she took over countless pop culture platforms. Being the first black model to cover Sports Illustrated, Banks was one of the most prominent models in the early 2000s. Covering Sports Illustrated, Elle, Essence, Vogue, and walking for Chanel, Chrisitan Dior, and Claude Monanta, Banks was truly dominating the fashion world. In addition, she acted in Fresh Prince of Bel Air and created her own reality competition show called America's Next Top Model. In conversation with Trebay of Los the New York Times, Banks stated that her first cover on Sports Illustrated "changed [her] life overnight. You have to think back to remember what that did for an appreciation of black beauty to have a black girl, a girl next door type, on the cover of one of the most mass mainstream magazines of our lives. It was a societal statement, a political statement, and an economic one". Now, models like Joan Smalls, Winne Harlow, Slick Woods, Jasmine Sanders and more are continuing the fight for black presence in the modelling world and using their successors as inspiration.

=== Fit models ===
A fit model (sometimes fitting model) is a person who is used by a fashion designer or clothing manufacturer to check the fit, drape and visual appearance of a design on a representative human being, effectively acting as a live mannequin.

=== Parts models ===
Some models are employed for their body parts. For example, hand models may be used to promote products held in the hand and nail-related products. (e.g. rings, other jewelry or nail polish). They are frequently part of television commercials. Many parts models have exceptionally attractive body parts, but there is also demand for unattractive or unusual looking body parts for particular campaigns.

Hands are the most in-demand body parts. Feet models are also in high demand, particularly those that fit sample-size shoes. Models are also successful modelling other specific parts including abs, arms, back, bust or chest, legs, and lips. Some petite models (females who are under 5 ft 6 in (1.68 m) and do not qualify as fashion models) have found success in women's body part modelling.

Parts model divisions can be found at agencies worldwide. Several agencies solely represent parts models, including Hired Hands in London, Body Parts Models in Los Angeles, Carmen Hand Model Management in New York and Parts Models in New York. Parts Models is the largest parts agency, representing over 300 parts models.

=== Petite models ===
Petite models are models that are under the typical height requirements that are expected of fashion models. Petite models typically work more often in commercial and print modelling (rather than runway modelling).

The height of fashion models is typically 5 feet 9 inches (1.75 m) and above for women, and 6 feet 1 inch (1.85 m) and above for men. Models who are shorter than these heights usually fall under the category of petite or commercial models.

=== Podium models ===
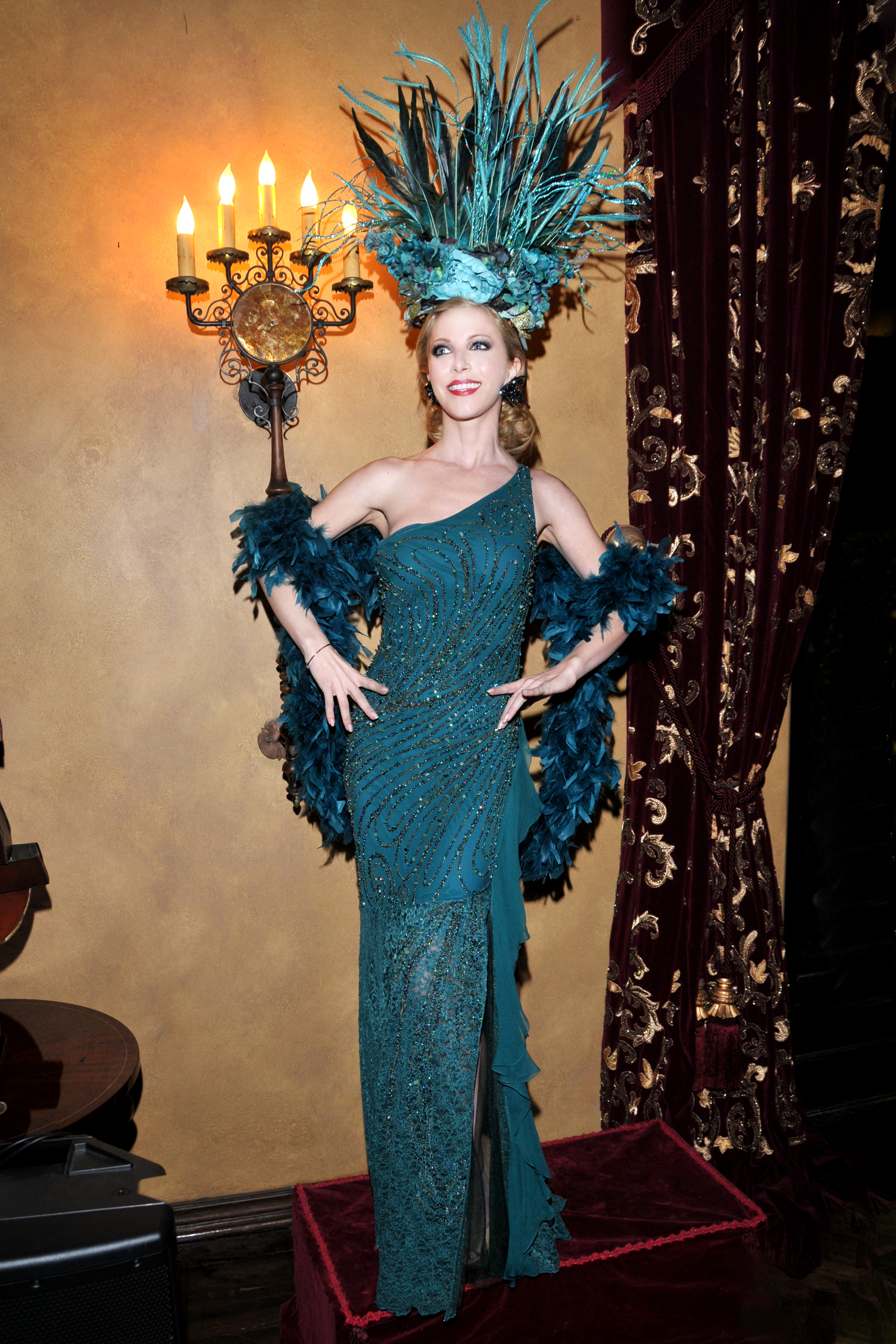
Podium model modelling a dress by Sue Wong

Podium models differ from runway models in that they do not walk down a runway, but rather just stand on an elevated platform. They resemble live mannequins placed in various places throughout an event. Attendees can walk up to the models and inspect and even feel the clothing. Podium Modelling is a practical alternative way of presenting a fashion show when space is too limited to have a full runway fashion show.

=== Earnings and demographics ===
According to the Bureau of Labor Statistics the median earnings for a model in the United States, as of 2021, is $34,000 annually. There are approximately 3,200 men and women who work as models full-time in the United States.

== Glamour models ==
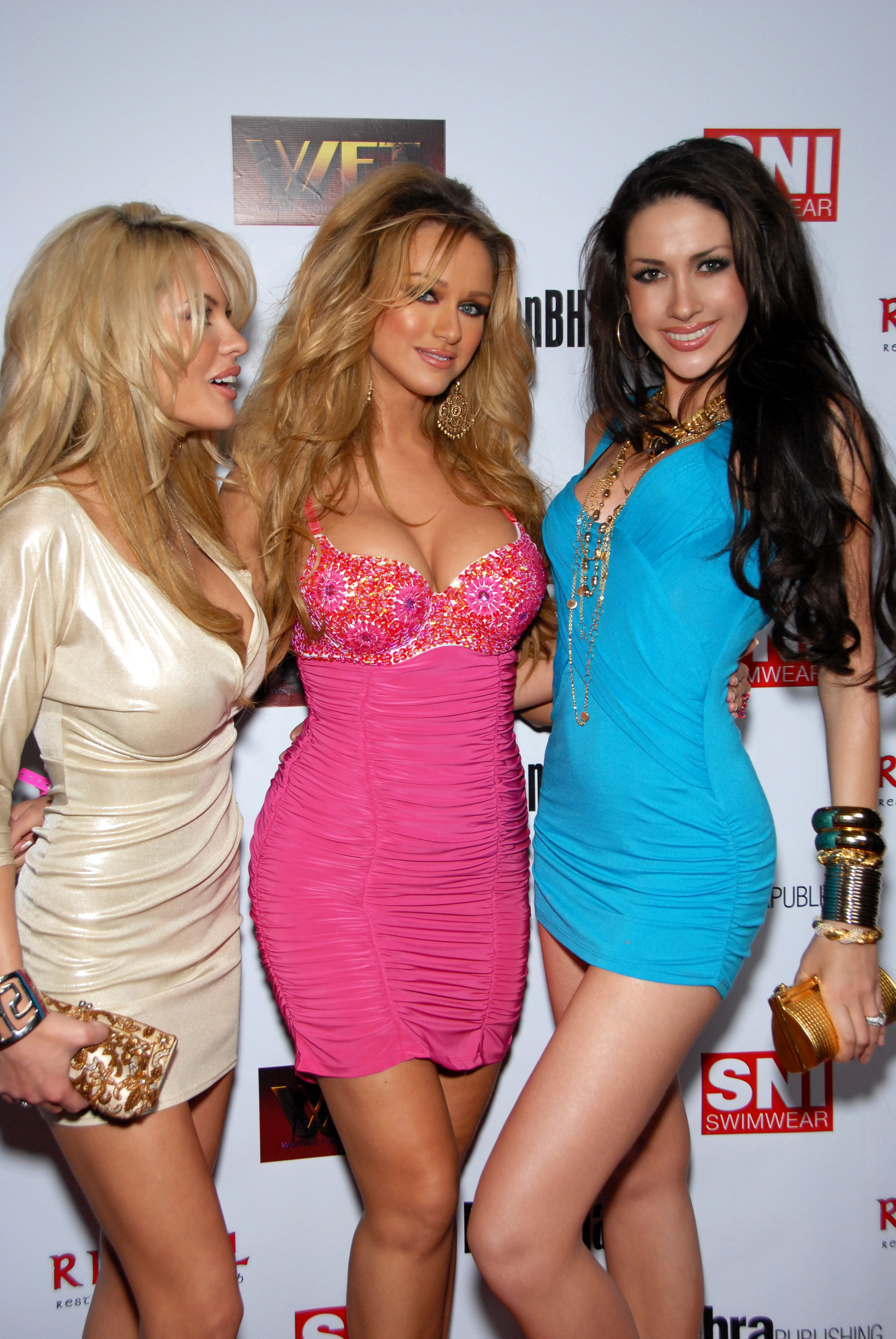
Glamour models posing on the red carpet—Hollywood, California

Glamour modelling focuses on sexuality; thus, general requirements are often unclear, depending more on each case. Glamour models can be any size or shape. A study from 2014 that analysed glamour model profiles estimated that the mean values of female models were 1.68 metres (5 ft 6 in) height, 54 kilograms (119 lb) weight and 0.73 waist-to-hip ratio.

There is no industry standard for glamour modelling and it varies greatly by country. For the most part, glamour models are limited to modelling in calendars, men's magazines, such as Playboy, bikini modelling, lingerie modelling, fetish modelling, music videos, and work in films as extras. However, some extremely popular glamour models transition into print advertising modelling, appearing in swimwear and lingerie campaigns.

In the UK, glamour modelling became a prominent feature of the newspaper industry when The Sun established Page 3 in 1969, a section in their newspaper which featured sexually suggestive images of Penthouse and Playboy models. From 1970 models appeared topless. In the 1980s, The Sun's competitors followed suit and produced their own Page 3 sections. It was during this time that glamour models first came to prominence with the likes of Samantha Fox. As a result, the United Kingdom has a very large glamour market and numerous glamour modelling agencies.

It was not until the 1990s that modern glamour modelling was established. During this time, the fashion industry was promoting models with waif bodies and androgynous-looking women, which left a void. Several fashion models, who were deemed too commercial, and too curvaceous, were frustrated with industry standards, and took a different approach. Models such as Victoria Silvstedt left the fashion world and began modelling for men's magazines. In the previous decades, posing nude for Playboy resulted in models losing their agencies and endorsements. Playboy was a stepping stone which catapulted the careers of Victoria Silvstedt, Pamela Anderson, Jenny McCarthy, and Anna Nicole Smith. Pamela Anderson became so popular from her Playboy spreads that she was able to land roles on Home Improvement and Baywatch.

In the mid-1990s, a series of men's magazines were established such as Maxim, FHM, and Stuff. At the same time, magazines including Sweden's Slitz (formerly a music magazine) re-branded themselves as men's magazines. Pre-internet, these magazines were popular among men in their late teens and early twenties because they were considered more tasteful than their predecessors. With the glamour market growing, fashion moved away from the waifs and onto Brazilian bombshells. The glamour market, consisting mostly of commercial fashion and print models, became its own genre due to its popularity. Even in a large market like the United Kingdom, however, glamour models are not usually signed exclusively to one agency as they can not rely financially on one agency to provide them with enough work. It was, and still is, a common practice for glamour models to partake in kiss-and-tell interviews about their dalliances with famous men. The notoriety of their alleged bed-hopping often propels their popularity and they are often promoted by their current or former fling. With Page 3 models becoming fixtures in the British tabloids, glamour models such as Jordan, now known as Katie Price, became household names. By 2004, Page 3 regulars earned anywhere from £30,000 to 40,000, where the average salary of a non–Page 3 model, as of 2011, was between £10,000 and 20,000. In the early 2000s, glamour models, and aspiring glamour models, appeared on reality television shows such as Big Brother to gain fame. Several Big Brother alumni parlayed their fifteen minutes of fame into successful glamour modelling careers. However, partly because of competition from the rising internet—giving audiences access to large amounts of, often free, online content—and its own glamour stars, such as Jordan Capri, the offline glamour market became saturated by the mid-2000s, and numerous men's magazines including Arena, Stuff and FHM in the United States went under. During this time, there was a growing trend of glamour models, including Kellie Acreman and Lauren Pope, becoming DJs to supplement their income. In a 2012 interview, Keeley Hazell said that going topless is not the best way to achieve success and that "[she] was lucky to be in that 1% of people that get that, and become really successful."

=== Gravure idols ===
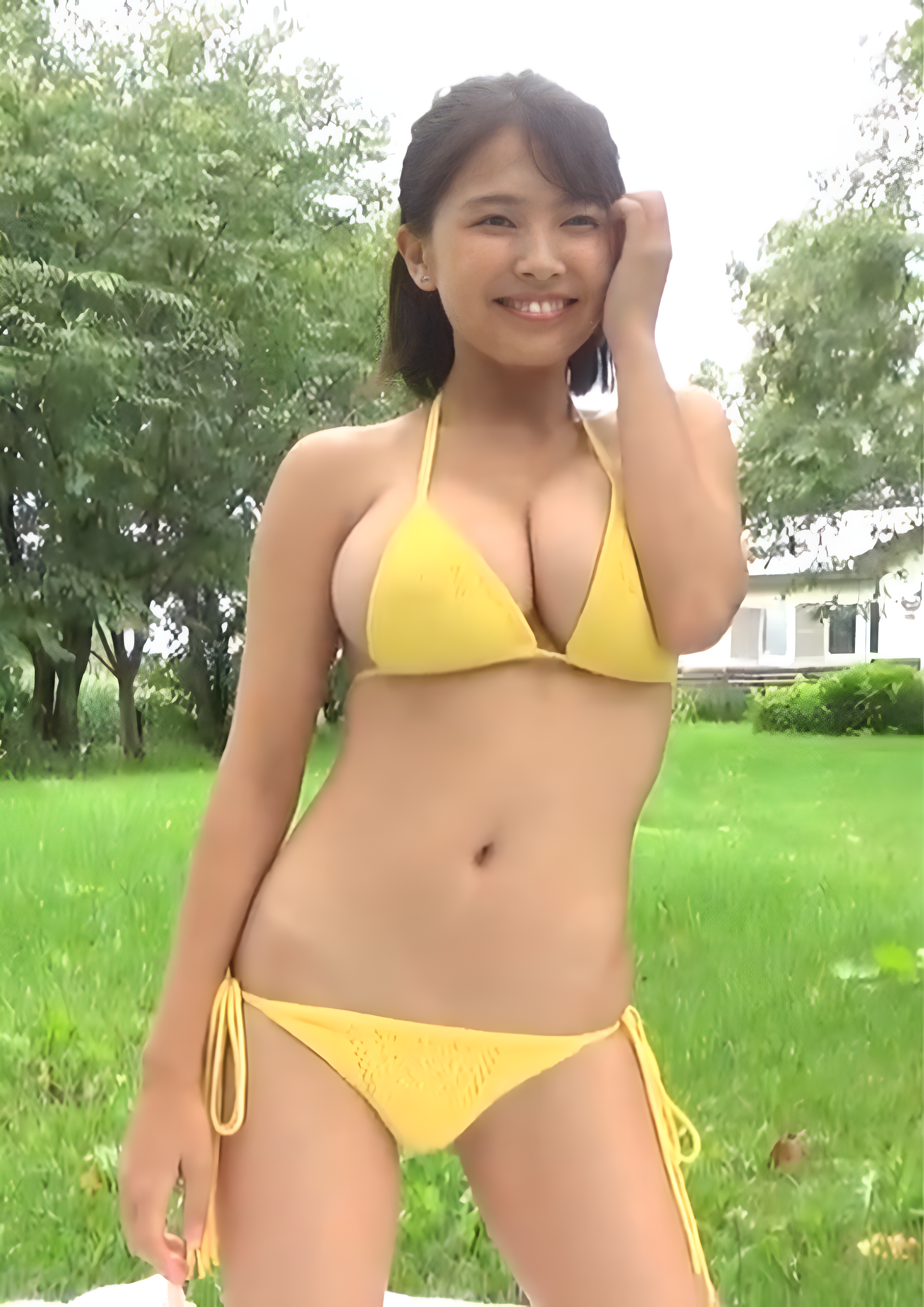
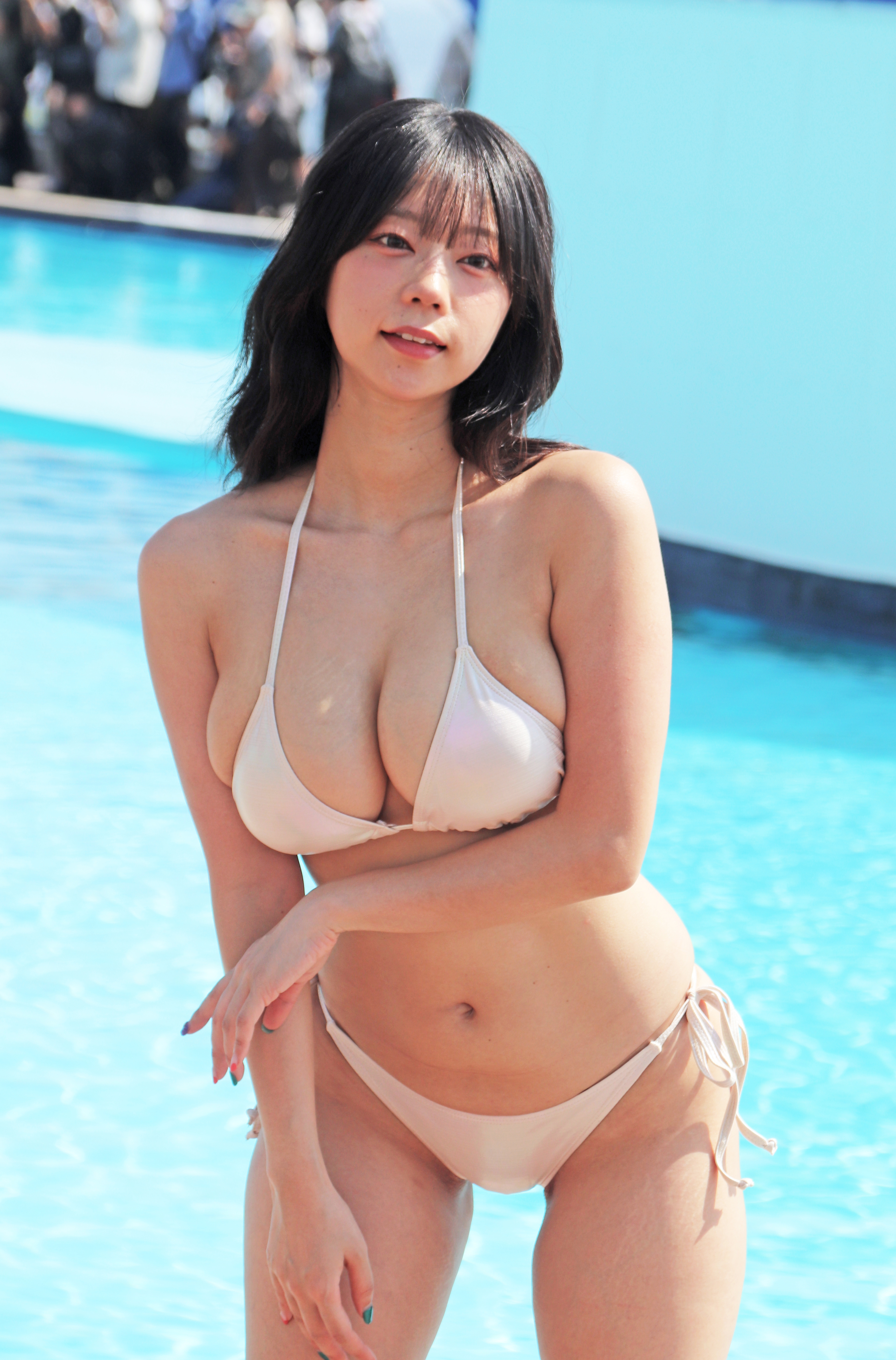
The gravure idols Rio Teramoto (left) and Hikaru Aoyama (right)

In Japan, a gravure idol (グラビアアイドル, gurabia aidoru), often abbreviated to gradol (グラドル, guradoru), is a female model who primarily models for magazines, especially men's magazines, photobooks or DVDs. It is considered part of the overall idol industry in Japan. "Gurabia" (グラビア) is a wasei-eigo term derived from "rotogravure", which is a type of intaglio printing process that was once a staple of newspaper photo features, and is still used for commercial printing of magazines, postcards, and cardboard product packaging. Hence, the term can be loosely translated as "magazine model".

Gravure idols appear in a wide range of photographic styles and genres. Their photos are largely aimed at male audiences with poses or activities intended to be provocative or suggestive, generally accentuated by an air of playfulness and innocence rather than aggressive sexuality. Although gravure idols may sometimes wear clothing that exposes most of their body, they seldom appear fully nude. Gravure idols may be as young as pre-teen age up to their early thirties. In addition to appearing in mainstream magazines, gravure idols often release their own professional photobooks and DVDs for their fans. Many popular female idols in Japan started their careers as gravure idols.

=== Alternative models ===
An alternative model is any model who does not fit into the conventional model types and may include punk, goth, fetish, and tattooed models or models with distinctive attributes. This type of modelling is usually a cross between glamour modelling and art modelling. Publishers such as Goliath Books in Germany introduced alternative models and punk photography to larger audiences. Billi Gordon, then known as Wilbert Anthony Gordon, was the top greeting card model in the world and inspired a cottage industry, including greeting cards, T-shirts, fans, stationery, gift bags, etc.

== Fitness models ==
Fitness modelling focuses on displaying a healthy, toned physique. Fitness models usually have defined muscle groups. The model's body weight is greater due to muscle being denser than fat; however, they have a lower body fat percentage and a higher degree of muscle definition.

Fitness models are often used in magazine advertising; they can also in some cases be certified personal fitness trainers. However, other fitness models are also athletes and compete as professionals in fitness and figure competitions.

There are several agencies in large markets such as New York, London, and Germany that have fitness modelling agencies. While there is a large market for these models, most of these agencies are secondary agencies promoting models who typically earn their primary income as commercial models. There are also magazines that are geared towards specifically fitness modelling or getting fit and in shape.

== Commercial models ==
=== Promotional models ===
A promotional model is a model hired to drive consumer demand for a product, service, brand, or concept by interacting in person with potential consumers. The vast majority of promotional models tend to be attractive in physical appearance. They serve to provide information about the product or service and make it appealing to consumers. While the interaction length may be short, the promotional model delivers a live experience that reflects on the product or service he or she represents. This form of marketing touches fewer consumers for the cost than traditional advertising media (such as print, radio, and television); however, the consumer's perception of a brand, product, service, or company is often more profoundly affected by a live person-to-person experience.

Marketing campaigns that make use of promotional models may take place in stores or shopping malls, at tradeshows, special promotional events, clubs, or even at outdoor public spaces. Promotional models may also be used as TV hosts/anchors for interviewing celebrities at film awards, sports events, etc. They are often held at high-traffic locations to reach as many consumers as possible or at venues where a particular type of target consumer is expected to be present.

==== Spokesmodels ====
"Spokesmodel" is a term used for a model who is employed to be associated with a specific brand in advertisements. A spokesmodel may be a celebrity used only in advertisements (in contrast to a brand ambassador who is also expected to represent the company at various events), but more often the term refers to a model who is not a celebrity in their own right. A classic example of the spokesmodel is the models hired to be the Marlboro Man between 1954 and 1999.

==== Trade show models ====
Trade show models work a trade show floorspace or booth and represent a company to attendees. Trade show models are typically not regular employees of the company, but are freelancers hired by the company renting the booth space. They are hired for several reasons: trade show models can make a company's booth more visible from the hundreds of other booths competing for attendee attention. They are articulate and quickly learn and explain or disseminate information on the company and its product(s) and service(s). And they can assist a company in handling a large number of attendees, which the company might otherwise not have enough employees to accommodate, possibly increasing the number of sales or leads resulting from participation in the show.

==== Atmosphere models ====
Atmosphere models are hired by the producers of themed events to enhance the atmosphere or ambience of their event. They are usually dressed in costumes exemplifying the event's theme and are often placed strategically in various locations around the venue. It is common for event guests to have their picture taken with atmosphere models. For example, if someone is throwing a "Brazilian Day" celebration, they would hire models dressed in samba costumes and headdresses to stand or walk around the party.

=== Instagram models ===
Instagram models are people who have accumulated a large number of followers on Instagram by posting engaging photos of themselves and their lifestyles, and are consequently hired by a company to advertise products as their influence and popularity can increase sales. They should not be confused with established models such as Cara Delevingne and Gigi Hadid, who use Instagram to promote their traditional modelling careers, although some models, such as Playboy model Lindsey Pelas, begin their careers conventionally and subsequently become Instagram models. Some models use Instagram success to develop their careers, such as Rosie Roff, who worked as a fashion model before being discovered via Instagram and gaining work as a ring girl in American boxing. In some cases, Instagram gives unsigned models a platform to attract the attention of agencies and talent scouts. American model Matthew Noszka entered the profession as a result of being discovered on Instagram by Wilhelmina Models.

The Instagram model concept originated in the late 2000s, when the boyfriends of fashion bloggers such as Rumi Neely and Chiara Ferragni began photographing their girlfriends in various outfits. Instagram models often attempt to become social media influencers and engage in influencer marketing, promoting products such as fashion brands and detox teas. High-profile influencers can earn thousands of dollars for promoting commercial brands. When choosing whom to employ, brands have become less concerned with the number of followers an influencer has and more focused on their engagement marketing strategy. Research indicates that 89% of influencers use Instagram to promote themselves, compared to 20% using Twitter and 16% using Facebook.

Some Instagram models have gained high-profile modelling jobs and become celebrities. Fitness model Jen Selter had become an Internet celebrity by 2014 and modelled for Vanity Fair magazine. Cosplayer and model Anna Faith acquired over 250,000 Instagram followers by 2014, gaining success from her ability to impersonate the Disney character Elsa. With Facebook's continuing decrease in post reach, Instagram has increasingly become cosplayers' favourite platform. American actress Caitlin O'Connor had almost 300,000 Instagram followers in 2016, earning most of her social media income from endorsing products on Instagram. American model Kayla Simmons has a million Instagram followers after posting images of herself in swimsuits. Australian personal trainer Kayla Itsines acquired 5.5 million Instagram followers, allowing her to build a business in the fitness industry. Brazilian model Claudia Alende gained a following of 2.8 million people on Instagram by 2015 and developed a career as a lingerie model. Plus-size models Iskra Lawrence and Tess Holliday have used Instagram to demonstrate their potential as models. Yashika Aannand, an Indian teenage actress, rose to prominence in the Tamil film industry after gaining popularity as an Instagram model with over 145,000 followers on her account by 2017. Iraqi cross-dressing model, Noor Alsaffar, was killed in September 2023 as part of an increase in violence against LGBTQ+ people.

Instagram model techniques and aesthetics have also been used in unconventional or parody profiles. Instagram model Lil Miquela has blurred the line between reality and social media, amassing more than 200,000 followers without revealing whether she is real or computer-generated. Australian comedian Celeste Barber had acquired 1.8 million Instagram followers by 2017, parodying celebrity fashion photographs with real-life reenactments. In 2016, French organisation Addict Aide ran a campaign to raise awareness for alcohol abuse among young people in which a model posed as Louise Delage, a fictitious 25-year-old Parisian whose Instagram photos nearly always featured alcohol. The account amassed 65,000 followers in a month, after which a reveal video posted to it had over 160,000 views.

Some reports suggest that a number of Instagram models obtain extra income by covertly working as prostitutes. Websites accusing various models of this, often without reliable evidence, have increased in popularity recently, sometimes with the unintended effect of increasing their earnings. But false accusations on these sites can harm legitimate models' reputations, and some women in the industry consider them a way for men to exert power over women.

== See also ==
- Artistic canons of body proportions – Criteria used in formal figurative art
- Female body shape
- Instagram's impact on people
- List of modeling agencies
- List of models in music videos
- Male body shape
- Size zero – US women's clothing size
- Time for print – Agreement between photographer and model
- Video vixen – Female model who appears in hip-hop videos and performances
