= TFCD =

TFCD may refer to:

- Task Force on Climate Related Financial Disclosures
- time for CD or trade for CD – see Time for print
- tFCD, a division in the Taiwanese Canadian Association of Toronto
