= Alva Chinn =

American model

- Occupation: Model
- Known for: One of Halston's Halstonettes
- Spouse: Rashid Silvera (?–?)
- Children: 1

Alva Chinn is an American fashion model.

== Early life, career beginnings ==
She is of Chinese, English, Indian, and Black ancestry. She grew up in Boston where she was the valedictorian of her high school class. While attending the University of Massachusetts, she modeled for Mademoiselle magazine's college issue. Shortly thereafter, she moved to New York to start a modeling career.

== Work ==
She modeled for Halston, Saint Laurent, Chanel, and Chloé. Gianni Versace booked her in exclusivity to model his collections in the early 1980s. In 2004, she and designer Stephen Burrows collaborated on a collection.

With Pat Cleveland, Anjelica Huston, Pat Ast, Karen Bjornson, Nancy North and Connie Cook, among others, she became one of Halston's favored troupe of models, nicknamed the Halstonettes. In 2019, she was one of many of his former models to be interviewed for the documentary film Halston. She also appears on the cover of Chic's 1977 self-titled debut album Chic.

== Awards ==
In 2011, Chinn was recognized by the Huffington Post Game Changer Awards. The awards honored African American models featured in The Battle of Versailles Fashion Show which was a fashion show held on November 28, 1973, in the Palace of Versailles in France. The fashion show was organized to raise money to restore the palace. Chinn was among several models recognized, including Pat Cleveland, Bethann Hardison, Billie Blair, Norma Jean Darden, Charlene Dash, Jennifer Brice, Barbara Jackson, China Machado, Ramona Saunders, and Amina Warsuma.
