= PFT =

PFT may refer to:

== Medical and fitness ==
- Physical Fitness Test, a test of an individual's physical fitness such as ability to exercise, etc.
- Pulmonary Function Testing, testing of the respiratory system
- Pore-forming toxins, a class of proteins

== Other ==
- Patrimoine Ferroviaire et Tourisme, a Belgian railway preservation society
- Paul F. Tompkins, contemporary American comedian and podcaster
- Pearce-Ford Tower, the largest residence hall in the state of Kentucky at Western Kentucky University
- PFT Commenter, American podcaster
- Plant Functional Type, a classification of plants for use in climatology
- Polish Fighting Team, or "Skalski's Circus", a group of World War II Polish fighter pilots
- Print for time, a business arrangement between a photographer and a model
- Profootballtalk.com, a news and rumor website that focuses on the National Football League in the United States
