= Invisible Beauty =

- Theatrical release poster
- Directed by: Bethann Hardison; Frédéric Tcheng
- Produced by: Lisa Cortés
- Cinematography: Mia Cioffi Henry; Frédéric Tcheng
- Edited by: Chris McNabb; Frédéric Tcheng
- Music by: Marc Anthony Thompson; Kavin 1
- Production companies: Cortés Filmworks; Lane B Production; Vogue Studios; Whitewater Films; JustFilms/Ford Foundation
- Distributed by: Magnolia Pictures
- Release dates: January 21, 2023 (Sundance); September 15, 2023
- Running time: 115 minutes
- Country: United States
- Language: English
- Box office: $92,040

Invisible Beauty is a 2023 American documentary film directed by Bethann Hardison and Frédéric Tcheng. It explores the life and career of Hardison.

It had its world premiere at the 2023 Sundance Film Festival on January 21, 2023, and was released on September 15, 2023, by Magnolia Pictures.

== Plot ==
Explores the life and career of Bethann Hardison, following her journey as a model, modeling agent, and activist. Whoopi Goldberg, Zendaya, Naomi Campbell, Tracee Ellis Ross, Fran Lebowitz, Tyson Beckford, Pat Cleveland and Stephen Burrows appear in the film.

== Production ==
Initially, Bethann Hardison wanted to make a film on the fashion industry; however, people told her that she should be making a film about herself, so she decided to tell her story. Bethann Hardison and Frédéric Tcheng met in 2014, when Tcheng worked on a short film for Council of Fashion Designers of America. The two kept in touch, deciding to make the film together, with production commencing during the COVID-19 pandemic. The two decided to make Hardison's voice central to the story. The first cut of the film was seven hours long, with Hardison and Tcheng discussing making the project into a potential series, however, they were told by Producer Lisa Cortés that investors wanted a feature film.

== Release ==
The film had its world premiere at the 2023 Sundance Film Festival on January 21, 2023. It also screened at Hot Docs International Film Festival on May 2, 2023. and Tribeca Festival on June 13, 2023. In July 2023, Magnolia Pictures acquired distribution rights to the film. It was released on September 15, 2023.
