= Lady Bird Cleveland =

American painter (b. 1926, d. 2015)

- Born: July 24, 1926; Cornelia, Georgia, US
- Died: June 2, 2015 (aged 88); Willingboro Township, New Jersey, US
- Known for: painter
- Children: Pat Cleveland

Lady Bird Strickland (also Lady Bird Cleveland or Ladybird Cleveland) (July 24, 1926 – June 2, 2015) was an American painter whose work primarily depicts the African-American experience, focusing on aspects of life from slavery and the civil rights movement to entertainment and culture to President Barack Obama's inauguration. She is the mother of the fashion model Pat Cleveland.

== Early life and work ==
Strickland was born into poverty in Cornelia, Georgia, to a black mother and an Irish-Scottish and black father. She was of African, Cherokee and Irish heritage.

Her mother ran a restaurant from their home called Sally's Tea Room, which became a popular spot in the area. However, her family was still poor. She was one of six children. She started to draw at an early age, using striped paper from tablets because she did not have access to drawing paper. As an African American girl in a deeply segregated part of Georgia, she was not encouraged to express herself. She was reprimanded by her teachers when she was caught drawing in school, swatting her with a hickory stick.

In 1940, at age 13, Lady Bird moved alone to Harlem in New York to help her sister take care of her five children. Becoming the sole breadwinner for her sister's family, she began work in a zipper factory. She started attending Wadleigh High School for Girls in Harlem, where her artistic talents were recognized and encouraged by her teachers. Her oil painting of a bent-over laundress entitled "The tired woman" was entered into the R. H. Macy's Scholastic Achievements contest by one of her teachers and subsequently won Strickland a scholarship to Pratt Institute, where she was the only female in her soldering class. In her youth, Strickland would spend time in Harlem clubs, but by her adulthood, she began to socialize and make art with leading entertainment and political figures of the twentieth century.

During World War II, Strickland dropped out of school to find work. To financially support herself, Strickland worked in a storefront window, painting ties and crafting ultraviolet billboards. During this time she also produced paintings to sell, she eventually was noticed by various art critics. After the birth of her daughter, Pat Cleveland, Strickland worked at Bellevue Hospital.

Her paintings of the 1940s would reflect scenes of the Harlem nightlife featuring figures such as Josephine Baker, Duke Ellington, Marian Anderson, Eartha Kitt, Miles Davis and Billy Eckstein. She has been photographed by Carl van Vechten, and has done catalogs for Elsa Peretti the jewelry designer for Tiffany's.

By the 1980s, Strickland had moved to Willingboro Township, New Jersey. She remarried an Army veteran. However, Strickland continued her mission "to paint black history from the heart," and created a number of works featuring significant figures in African American history including Sojourner Truth, Frederick Douglass, W.E.B. DuBois, Jesse Owens, Medgar Evers, and Shirley Chisholm. Her later works also include paintings of former President Barack Obama's election victory.

== Personal life ==
While in Harlem, Strickland entered into an affair with saxophonist Johnny Johnston, resulting in the birth of her daughter Pat Cleveland in 1950. She raised her daughter as a single mother in Harlem.

During the 1960s, Strickland was involved in her daughter's modeling career. Strickland worked as her daughter's personal dresser, because at the time Cleveland was underaged. The two would travel between Cleveland's modeling jobs on Greyhound buses for months at a time.

== See also ==
- List of people from Harlem
