= The Battle of Versailles Fashion Show =

Fashion show in 1973

The Battle of Versailles Fashion Show was a historic fashion event held at the Palace of Versailles in Versailles, France on November 28, 1973. Conceived by fashion publicist Eleanor Lambert as a fundraiser for the palace's restoration, the event brought together five French designers—Yves Saint Laurent, Pierre Cardin, Emanuel Ungaro, Marc Bohan, and Hubert de Givenchy—and five American designers—Oscar de la Renta, Stephen Burrows, Halston, Bill Blass, and Anne Klein—in a widely publicized transatlantic showcase.

Attended by approximately 700 guests, including figures such as Princess Grace of Monaco, Jacqueline de Ribes, Andy Warhol, and featuring performances by Liza Minnelli, Rudolf Nureyev, and Josephine Baker, the event became a defining moment in fashion history. Although the French designers initially regarded their American counterparts as producers of sportswear, the American presentation—featuring an unprecedented number of Black models—was widely considered to have "stolen the show," signaling a shift in the global fashion landscape.

== Background ==
The Battle of Versailles was conceived by Eleanor Lambert, a champion of American fashion who founded the International Best Dressed List, the Coty Awards, and the Council of Fashion Designers of America. Lambert ensured strong representation for American designers and proposed the idea to Gerald van der Kemp, head curator of the Palace of Versailles. In 1973, Lambert recalled how the idea arose: "Two summers ago when Lambert was vacationing on the Riviera, she mentioned within ear range of Gerald van der Kemp, head curator of Versailles, that if ever he needed to raise a lot of money for charity, she had a crazy idea. 'He heard the idea,' said Lambert, 'and suggested Versailles.'"

Baroness Marie-Hélène de Rothschild, appointed honorary chairwoman, organized the French side of the event. Renowned for her social influence and ability to manage creative personalities, she secured approval from President Georges Pompidou to use the Palace of Versailles. The event was designed as a fundraiser for the palace's restoration and to stage a friendly competition between American and French fashion designers.

The five American designers chosen were Bill Blass, Stephen Burrows, Halston, Anne Klein, and Oscar de la Renta, and the five French couturiers were Pierre Cardin, Christian Dior, Hubert de Givenchy, Yves Saint Laurent, and Emanuel Ungaro. Each designer was to submit eight designs for consideration. Fashion critic Bill Cunningham observed, "Giving the fashion caravan the air of an opera melodrama are the prima donna designers who were invited, others who weren't, and several who claimed they declined their invitations."

Demand for attendance was exceptionally high. The 720-seat theatre at Versailles sold out at $235 per ticket (programs were an additional $23), and invitations to related social events were highly sought after. Corporate sponsors and private donors contributed significantly to production costs, while American designers financed their participation in part through private backing.

Despite last-minute logistical difficulties during rehearsals—including labor disputes and production delays—the show proceeded successfully. The positive reception helped to quell earlier criticism regarding costs and designer selection. Audience reactions from prominent attendees, including Princess Grace of Monaco, Andy Warhol, Marie-Hélène de Rothschild, Jacqueline de Ribes, Liliane Bettencourt, São Schlumberger, Dewi Sukarno, Gloria Guinness, Baron Alexis de Rédé, Princess Maria Gabriella of Savoy, underscored the impact of the presentations, with many observers noting a shift in the balance of influence between French and American fashion.

== Event ==
=== Pre-event festivities ===
Pre-event festivities across Paris—including dinners, receptions, and parties—attracted prominent figures from fashion, business, and high society. Such gatherings contributed to what Enid Nemy of The New York Times described as a "tizzy" within the city's fashion and social circles.

The celebrations began on November 25 with a dinner hosted by the owner of the Colony Club, followed the next day by a high-profile supper dance at Maxim's in honor of Liza Minnelli, hosted by business executive David J. Mahoney of Norton Simon, which had recently acquired Halston's business. Fashion columnist Eugenia Sheppard of the Los Angeles Times described the atmosphere: "Some are calling it American week in Paris, and others the Versailles Follies…. Whatever the label, it is definitely not just the historic French-American fashion show that it started out to be. Maxim's at luncheon is a gossip columnist's paradise…. What started out as a simple enough plan to put top French and American fashion together in a single show to benefit the Versailles Restoration Fund, but at the moment has become a boiling pot of fuels, misunderstandings, hurt feelings, jockeying for position, and rumors."

=== Fashion show and gala ===
The Battle of Versailles took place on November 28, 1973, as a large-scale fashion spectacle staged in the Royal Opera of the Palace of Versailles. Conceived as a fundraiser for the restoration of the palace, the event brought together five American designers—Bill Blass, Stephen Burrows, Anne Klein, Halston, and Oscar de la Renta—and five French couturiers—Yves Saint Laurent, Emanuel Ungaro, Pierre Cardin, Christian Dior, and Hubert de Givenchy. The program also included performances by artists such as Liza Minnelli, Josephine Baker, and Rudolf Nureyev, and aimed to raise approximately $260,000.

The French presentation, shown first, was characterized by elaborate staging, theatrical sets, and performances that at times overshadowed the garments. Each designer's segment was accompanied by a decorative float, often in the form of a carriage set against pastoral backdrops; Yves Saint Laurent's took the form of an elongated vintage automobile, while Pierre Cardin featured a space-themed set that reportedly encountered technical difficulties. In the finale, the French designers employed a minimalist backdrop of interconnected poles, against which performers from the Crazy Horse Saloon modeled fur designs by Christian Dior, Revillon, Emanuel Ungaro, and Saint Laurent. The sequence culminated in a provocative display in which the garments were gradually opened to reveal the body, reflecting the production's attention on spectacle and sensuality over conventional couture presentation.

In contrast, the American segment—produced and choreographed by Kay Thompson—emphasized energy, movement, and a modern, streamlined approach to fashion presentation. When Minnelli opened the American portion with "Bonjour Paris," the audience responded with sustained applause, and contemporary accounts widely agreed that the American designers "stole the show." The American collections ranged from Anne Klein's clean, practical designs to Stephen Burrows's colorful, experimental garments; Bill Blass' tailored, historically inspired looks; Halston's theatrical and fluid silhouettes; and Oscar de la Renta's soft, romantic eveningwear. The presentation blended simplicity with spectacle, incorporating music, choreography, and diverse models in a departure from traditional couture shows. After the show, guests attended a supper hosted by Baron and Baroness Guy de Rothschild, held across five State Apartments of the Palace.

=== Post-event party ===
Closing the festivities the day after the fashion show was a dinner hosted by Baron Alexis de Rédé in his apartments at the Hotel Lambert, nominally in honor of Kay Thompson, who had already departed Paris. Gossip columnist Suzy referred to the gathering as "Versailles Mouthwash," writing that "someone said it took the bad taste of all the bickering surrounding the Versailles Follies out of all those beautiful, bee-stung mouths."

== Legacy ==
In 2011, the Huffington Post Game Changer Awards honored the African American models of Versailles with the Style Award. The models included Pat Cleveland, Bethann Hardison, Billie Blair, Jennifer Brice, Alva Chinn, Norma Jean Darden, Charlene Dash, Barbara Jackson, Ramona Saunders, and Amina Warsuma.

The original event had not been a battle but had been an effort at collaboration. Nonetheless, in the 21st century, the event would be portrayed as a fierce competition between the two countries' designers, a "battle," though at the time it was seen as a friendly and harmonious example of collaboration and cooperation in which the US designers surprised attendees. US designers were already seen as leading lights during the casual, sportswear-dominated 1970s, with increasing numbers of French and other designers opening branch offices in New York to be part of the zeitgeist, and the Versailles event seemed an extension of this growing closeness.

In 2012, filmmaker Deborah Riley Draper chronicled the event in the feature documentary, Versailles '73: American Runway Revolution. The film included designer Stephen Burrows, French Chambre Syndicale President Didier Grumbach, and many of the models, journalists, and guests who attended the event in 1973.

In 2016 another documentary "Battle at Versailles" was made by the fashion network M2M, chronicling the event. The film was narrated by Stanley Tucci and featured many of the event's participants.

A fictionalized version of the Battle is depicted in the television miniseries Halston, which premiered May 2021 on Netflix.

On December 7, 2023, Madrid-based board game publisher Salt & Pepper Games launched a crowdfunding campaign for their card-driven tabletop game depicting the event on the Gamefound platform. In "The Battle of Versailles," two players take the role of either the American or French design teams in a fashion battle to contribute the most to the reconstruction of the Palace of Versailles.
