= Sterling St. Jacques =

American model, dancer and actor

Sterling Thomas Saint Jacques (1951 (Note: He could not have been born in 1957. According to the October 27, 1971 issue of the Deseret News, he was 20 years old. The May 13, 1973 issue of the New York Times reported that he was 21 at the time. His former fiancée Pat Cleveland said he was a Libra, making his birth year in 1951.) – 1992) was an American model, dancer, fashion designer, actor, and singer. Known by the nickname "Swirling Sterling," he is regarded as the first Black male supermodel.

Adopted as a teenager by actor Raymond St. Jacques in the 1960s, St. Jacques began his career as a background dancer on the television series Rowan & Martin's Laugh-In before pursuing modeling and acting. He became a prominent figure of the disco era, gaining recognition for his elegant dancing style and appearances at New York nightclubs including Regine's and Studio 54. He became known for dancing with celebrities and socialites and expanded his career into fashion and music. After relocating to Europe, he pursued a career as an Italo disco singer. His reported death from complications of HIV/AIDS has never been officially confirmed.

== Early life and education ==
Sterling Thomas Saint Jacques was born in a city outside Salt Lake City, Utah in 1951. He claimed to have never known his biological parents, which caused him to become rebellious, and he often ran away. His mother Lavon Ledbetter performed under the stage name Nina Hobbs, and sang with jazz bandleaders Count Basie and Duke Ellington. As a child, his family moved to Connecticut before returning to Salt Lake City where he attended Oquirrh School.

At age 15, he was adopted by actor Raymond St. Jacques, who was among the first African-American actors to portray a cowboy on television. St. Jacques later recalled, "He took an interest in me when he saw I was going nowhere and gave me the push I needed to get my head together." At 15, he also appeared on the Kimbo the Clown television show. He played basketball in high school and attended school in Hollywood with Lorna Luft, daughter of actress Judy Garland.

St. Jacques expressed an interest in following his father into show business. In 1970, the two were profiled together by the Los Angeles Times for their shared interest in fashion. Raymond St. Jacques said that they influenced each other's style, noting that "there is no clothing generation gap in our family" and that they often wore the same shirts and coats. At the time, Sterling divided his time between studying at Los Angeles City College and working part-time at a men's boutique on the Sunset Strip.

== Career ==
=== Early career ===
Before his father helped him land a role as a background dancer on the television series Laugh-In, he was a dancer at Disneyland. He moved to New York to study acting at the Lee Strasberg Theatre & Film Institute after leaving California, living off part-time modeling work.

St. Jacques appeared in the July 1970 issue of Vogue magazine, modeling Japanese robes. While abroad in Rome, he was photographed by Horst P. Horst in 1973.

St. Jacques had a small role in the blaxploitation film Book of Numbers (1973), set during the Great Depression, which was set during the Great Depression and produced, directed, and starred his father. He then appeared in the Italian film Sistemo l'America e torno (I Fix America and Return) (1974), playing a Black militant who accompanies an Italian man through the United States. Variety praised him for his "good physical performance."

As a means to fund his expensive tastes, St. Jacques explored business ventures, including launching a fashion line. He designed some of his own clothing, such as a Canadian fur coat that attracted buyers, selling for $5,000 apiece.

In 1975, St. Jacques traveled to Paris with his father, where he began designing bathing suits for friends. Through that work, he met several European designers and soon started modeling for them. "I went to Rome for Louis Vuitton and wound up living there for a year. I was doing a lot of things, even working as a disc jockey for a Rome radio station — and I could have made a lot of money if I'd stayed there, but I decided to come home because I got the feeling it was where I really belonged," he recalled.

=== Rise to prominence in New York ===
Back in New York City, St. Jacques struggled to make ends meet as an unknown model and took a job as a dance instructor at a local club called Infinity. He invited French designer Hubert de Givenchy to watch him perform there, having known the designer for several years but never having danced for him. Givenchy subsequently invited St. Jacques to model his menswear collection at a benefit show held at the Waldorf-Astoria in April 1976, telling him, "You are the only thing that can make it modern." During the presentation, St. Jacques performed several solo dances and partnered with the female models. He said that Givenchy was his business manager and used him as a "mascot" for the benefit, believing that he represented "perfect health and vigor." Bernadine Morris of The New York Times likened him to dancer Fred Astaire. His appearance caused a sensation, particularly among wealthy high society women, who clamored to dance with him at discotheques such as Regine's.

As his popularity grew, St. Jacques became a fixture of New York's social and fashion scene, performing at parties and fashion shows and earning the nickname "Swirling Sterling." In May 1976, socialite Nan Kempner told André Leon Talley of Women's Wear Daily, "He's the most exciting thing that has come into my life in a long time. Sterling called me the other day before he left and I told him, 'Dancing with you is like taking a marvelous upper.'" In June 1976, St. Jacques was photographed dancing with Jackie Kennedy Onassis at a benefit for the Special Olympics at the Pierre Hotel. That year, St. Jacques told Sepia magazine that he and Onassis were "the closest of friends" and that he gave her private dancing lessons.

In 1976, St. Jacques met model Pat Cleveland, and the two frequently performed together, drawing inspiration from Fred Astaire and Ginger Rogers in an effort to revive the elegance of the 1940s. They appeared on the television program Soul Train and performed at the Lincoln Center for a benefit. They also appeared nude in the Broadway musical Let My People Come at the Morosco Theater, which closed after 108 performances, all of them previews.

St. Jacques and Cleveland became a notable couple among the jet set crowd and were part of fashion designer Halston's entourage. In August 1976, they performed wearing Halston bunny masks at a birthday party for Diane de Beauvau-Craon held at Halston's house. In 1977, they traveled with Halston as models while he presented his resort collection in nine cities across the United States.

St. Jacques and Cleveland appeared as dancers in the 1978 musical fantasy film The Wiz, in the Emerald City Citizens dance sequence. As part of the film's promotion, they demonstrated dance steps and costumes from the film at the John Wanamaker Store in Philadelphia.

In the late 1970s, St. Jacques was a staple at the New York nightclub Studio 54. He was often photographed dancing with celebrities and socialites such as Bianca Jagger, Diana Ross, Liza Minnelli, and Caroline Kennedy. His social circle also included Studio 54 owner Steve Rubell, Pop artist Andy Warhol, and Halston who were regulars at the nightclub. Reportedly, St. Jacques inspired the hit song "He's the Greatest Dancer" by Sister Sledge.

St. Jacques also contributed to Warhol's Interview magazine. He interviewed singer Esther Phillips for the June 1977 issue.

In May 1978, St. Jacques launched a singing career at a disco party hosted by Razor Mills-Hoechst Fibers at Doubles in New York City. He described his musical style as "disco-jazz" and announced plans to launch a clothing line for both men and women. The garments were to be manufactured in Europe and sold in the United States. He described the proposed collection as combining disco and sportswear influences, but declined to identify his financial backers.

In October 1978, St. Jacques performed in an Egyptian-themed production at a party celebrating the launch of Tut Productions at the Paradise Garage in New York's West Village.

=== Later career ===
In the early 1980s, St. Jacques moved to Europe, where he found moderate success as an Italo disco singer. In 1981, he participated in the Sanremo Festival with the song with song "Tutto è Blu." Although a journalist remarked that he sang out of tune, St. Jacques was noted for his impressive physique, and he believed that his dancing, passion, and dedication to maintaining his body made him a complete artist. He subsequently faded from public view, and little is known about his later career. In a 1988 interview, his father said that St. Jacques had a television show in Düsseldorf, West Germany.

== Personal life ==
=== Racial identity and sexuality ===
St. Jacques spoke openly about his background and his views on sexuality. In 1976, he described himself as "a cocktail," explaining, "My looks are a mix from my dad's side. He's French, Cuban and Watusi. The mixture is like Brazil. And I've got blue eyes." Journalists noted, however, that his blue eyes were actually contact lenses. He regarded his success as a Black male model as an opportunity to challenge stereotypes, saying, "I'm proud to make black people see they can be doing this kind of work." He argued that Black men could be "macho-looking while at the same time have grace and smoothness" and said that designers recognized his ability to convey "sophistication and modernness."

Although he declined to state his own sexual preferences, St. Jacques spoke openly about sexual fluidity and what he called "mental sex." He explained, "You walk down the street, experience a sexual fantasy of any sort with a person you make eye contact with and you know you've touched somebody." He welcomed changing attitudes toward sexuality, saying, "Bisexuality, for instance, is the new 'in' thing and I think that's healthy," and arguing that people were beginning to recognize that "there's more to it than just male and female roles." Comparing Europe with the United States, he observed, "In America, a man thinks that if he is touched by how beautiful another man is it automatically means he's a homosexual. It means nothing of the sort."

=== Relationships ===
St. Jacques had a highly publicized relationship with model Pat Cleveland. Although it was reported that they first met while modeling in Paris in 1973, Cleveland wrote in her memoir, Walking Girl: A Memoir (2016), that they met at New York's Hurrah nightclub in 1976. They became engaged shortly afterward, and St. Jacques moved into Cleveland's apartment at 100 Central Park South. In September 1977, St. Jacques told Andy Warhol that they had broken up. Cleveland later stated that, despite their "deep devotion to each other," their relationship ended after nearly a year and a half because of St. Jacques' preference for men. She claimed that, before their relationship, St. Jacques had only been sexually involved with men and had a "long affair" with Hubert de Givenchy.

During an intermission for the play Let My People Come in September 1976, St. Jacques was arrested on a third-degree larceny charge for allegedly stealing $1,000 worth of jewelry from his former girlfriend, Juliet Baruch. St. Jacques said it was a case of "a woman scorned."

== Death ==
According to his former fiancée, Pat Cleveland, St. Jacques died of complications from HIV/AIDS in 1984. However, his death was never officially confirmed. In a 1988 interview with the Chicago Tribune, his father, Raymond St. Jacques, stated that he was in Düsseldorf. In 1991, Jet magazine reported that St. Jacques had been left "the sum of $1.00" in his father's will, which had been stipulated in October 1988. He died in July 1992.

== Discography ==
Albums

- 1980: Sterling Saint Jacques (Dig-It International Records – PL 3023)

Singles

- 1980: "Again" / "I'm A Star" (Dig-It International Records – DG NP 1201)
- 1980: "Muscle Man" / "Rock Blue" (Dig-It International Records – PL/PROM 3024)
- 1981: "Tutto È Blu (Blue)" / "Turn Me On" (Dig-It International Records – DG 1205)
- 1981: "Des Mots Pour Toi" / "Manhattan Man" (Polydor – 2056905)
- 1983: "Comin, Into Love" (Papillon Records – MRP 4002)
- 1984: "Mister Moonlight" (Airport – ITF 362)
