= Time for print =

Agreement between photographer and model

Trade for Prints(or Talent for Prints (TFP), Trade for Portfolio (TFP)) is a term that describes an arrangement between industry members (including models, photographers, stylists, and hair and makeup artists) whereby each member agrees to participate in exchange for image rights to the photos that the photographer will deliver. Often this agreement includes a certain number of pictures and a release or license to use those pictures in return for the model's skill. "Trade" refers to each person contributing an equal level of expertise during the photo shoot and "Print" historically refers to a physically printed photo, but has evolved to mean digital image delivery.

There are benefits to all parties of such an arrangement. Everyone can build or improve their portfolio at little or no cost.

== Conditions ==
Each photo shoot arranged is usually negotiated separately, and the terms can vary widely. The number of pictures which the photographer delivers can range from a single photograph up to all shots taken. Speed of delivery can vary as well, from digital delivery at the end of the shoot before the model leaves up to several months. Unless such a time period has been specifically discussed and agreed prior to the shoot, finished pictures ideally should be delivered within two weeks.

Additionally it is understood that if images are to be used in a commercial setting, meaning there will be monetary benefit above the initial exchange, that it is not an appropriate use and fees should be applied.

== Usage ==
Depending on local laws, a model or photographer might agree to limit or to 'not use' some of the pictures from a shoot. The model or photographer may agree to only use specifically agreed upon pictures (to avoid sub-standard pictures that damage the photographer's or model's reputation), or the photographer may agree to only use certain images in printed publications and not on the internet.

Legal requirements for a model release vary from place to place and from situation to situation, as does the situation regarding copyright. For example, under the Copyright, Designs and Patents Act 1988, a photographer in the United Kingdom can, subject to certain exclusions and unless specifically agreed to the contrary, use any photograph in any way he or she chooses, including selling them for profit. This does not necessarily apply in other countries. These issues should be discussed and agreed prior to the shoot, in writing if necessary.

Since photos can now be delivered by means other than printed, some variant wordings of this arrangement are Time for CD or Trade for CD (TFCD). With TFCD, the photographer provides the selection of images on a CD instead of prints. Similarly, with the ease and convenience of digital high-resolution images, the wording of the arrangement can often be Time for Image or Trade for Image (TFI). With TFI, the photographer provides the selection of images digitally (usually by email or download link) instead of physical prints. The generic term TF has evolved, where it does not necessarily refer to a tangible CD or printed image since the same accepted rules apply.

Additionally, Time for Pics (TFP) or Prints for Time (PFT) are outdated uses of the term where both modelling and photography were considered pursuits only by professionals. Perpetuated by common internet usage and historical referencing, this has created confusion and a vulnerability in the industry, leading to an uptick in non-professionals and influencers seeking free photography with no valued exchange.

== Variations ==
Negotiated compensation for a model's time can range from a straight cash figure, possibly including an amount for travel expenses or, depending on legal requirements, an extra amount for signing a model release, to a simple number of pictures in a chosen format. It can include part-pay, part-TFP arrangements or "Time for Clothes" agreements where the model is given some or all of the clothing which was procured for the shoot.

== Testing ==
While sometimes people use this term to mean TFP, agencies more commonly use it in the context of sending a new model to a photographer for a short session for portfolio pictures. While the model ultimately pays for these pictures, the agency normally pays in advance and deducts it from the model's earnings. Test shoots are also used by models to build experience. Test was also created by photographers to try out new ideas for final images to show a client, this is with no payment from either party.
