= Bethann Hardison =

American model and activist

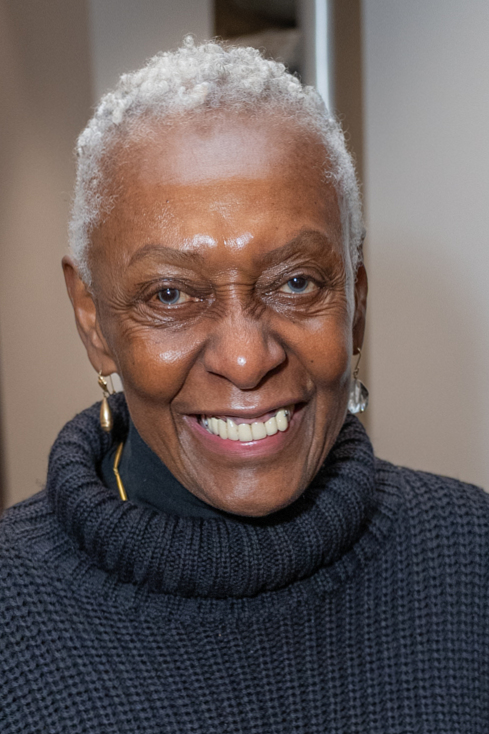
- Born: September 30, 1942 (age 83); Brooklyn, New York
- Children: Kadeem Hardison

Bethann Hardison is an American fashion model and activist. Hardison became one of the first high-profile black models after her appearance at the 1973 Battle of Versailles fashion show. She is also known for her activism on diversity in the fashion industry. Hardison has received several accolades for her work, including the 2014 CFDA Founders Award. Hardison is the mother of actor Kadeem Hardison.

== Life and career ==
Hardison was born in Brooklyn, New York. After graduating from George W. Wingate High School, Hardison attended the New York University Art School and the Fashion Institute of Technology but did not graduate from either. For a brief period Hardison worked as a corrections officer at Bedford Hills Correctional Facility. During the 1960s, Hardison worked in the garment district of New York City as a saleswoman.

In 1967, she was discovered by African American designer Willi Smith and began working for Smith as a fitting model, soon crossing over to the runway and print industries. Her first catwalk modelling was at the request of the fashion designer Chester Weinberg, who was supportive and encouraging despite the negative responses from the audience who were not accustomed to Hardison's style. Along with Beverly Johnson, Iman, and Pat Cleveland, Hardison broke barriers in the 1970s appearing in Allure, Harper's Bazaar, and Vogue. In 1973, she was featured in the Battle of Versailles fashion face off, a historical moment in which France's best designers competed against the top American designers of the time. Hardison then joined Click, a startup modeling agency, in 1980, as a booking agent where she produced fashion shows, handled public relations for design houses, and became a contributing editor at several magazines. Concerned with the politics of the fashion industry, Hardison changed her focus from modeling to activism in 1981.

Formed in 1984, the Bethann Management Agency focused on diversifying the fashion industry. Also, along with former model and friend Iman, Hardison co-founded the Black Girls Coalition in 1988 to provide advocacy and support to African American models. In 1996, Hardison turned her attention towards television where she co-executive produced television sitcoms “Between Brothers” and “Livin Large.” Hardison was also named Vogue Italia editor at large in 2010. As of April 2019, Hardison works as a consultant for Gucci and the CFDA.

Hardison's contributions in modeling and advocacy have earned her several awards throughout her career. In April 1999, she was honored with the First Annual Vibe Style Lifetime Achievement Award. Later that year, the Magic Johnson Foundation presented Hardison with a Distinguished Service Award. The Black Alumni of the Pratt Institute honored Hardison with a 2003 Lifetime Achievement award. In 2012, she received a Woman of Power Legacy Award from Black Enterprise, and became a Frederick Douglass award recipient in 2013, for her work in promoting diversity in fashion. In 2014, Hardison received the CFDA Founders Award.

== Filmography ==
In 2023, Hardison, along with co-director Frédéric Tcheng, released Invisible Beauty, a documentary about her career and activism. The film premiered at the 2023 Sundance Film Festival.
