= Billie Blair =

American model

- Born: Arkansas, U.S.
- Occupations: Model, clergy

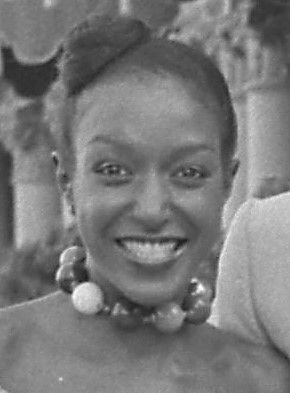
Blair in 1978.

Billie Blair is an American former model.

== Early life ==
Blair was born in Arkansas to parents Hattie and William Blair, and is of African-American descent. Her name was given to her due to her father's certainty that she was going to be a boy. His plan was to name his child William Junior; however, when Blair was born a girl, she was given the shortened version of that name, "Billie". They eventually moved to Flint, Michigan during the height of the auto industry there.

== Career ==
Blair began her career as a model by working through local modeling agencies in Detroit, which largely booked models for the Cobo Hall auto shows. Blair modeled at The Battle at Versailles Fashion Show in 1973. She credits her fame in the 1970s to Marji Kunz, then fashion editor of the Detroit Free Press. With Kunz's guidance, she flew to New York in 1973, a trip that was planned to last only three days, but instead turned into 20 years after Blair signed with the Ellen Harth agency and Eileen Ford of the Ford Models agency When landing in New York, Blair had shaved her head completely bald for a jewelry modeling job where she had to resemble an Egyptian. During her heyday, Blair earned $400 a day and received offers from magazines like Ebony and Mademoiselle.

Blair is currently a minister residing in Defiance, Ohio.
