= Pat Cleveland =

American fashion model (born 1950)

- Born: June 23, 1950 (age 76); New York City, U.S.
- Education: High School of Art and Design
- Occupation: Model
- Years active: 1966–present
- Spouses: Martin Snaric (m. 1978; div. 1982) Paul van Ravenstein (m. 1982)
- Children: 2, including Anna Cleveland
- Modeling information
- Hair color: Dark Brown
- Eye color: Brown
- Agency: The Model CoOp (New York); Next Model Management (Paris)

Patricia Cleveland (born June 23, 1950) is an American fashion model. Cleveland is regarded as one of the first Black supermodels and one of the most influential runway models of the 1970s. Known for her expressive, dance-like runway style, she has been referred to as "the Josephine Baker of the international runways."

Cleveland was born in New York City, the daughter of painter Lady Bird Cleveland, and began modeling as a teenager in 1966. She rose to prominence in the early 1970s and was among a group of Black American models who found greater opportunities in Paris than in the United States. She participated in the historic Battle of Versailles fashion show in 1973. Cleveland was also a member of the "Halstonettes," the troupe of models closely associated with designer Halston.

During the mid-1970s, Cleveland and her fiancé, model Sterling St. Jacques, became one of New York's most celebrated social couples. Dubbed the "hottest couple in America" by People magazine, they were fixtures of the city's nightclub scene. Following her marriage to photographer Paul van Ravenstein in 1982, Cleveland reduced her modeling commitments to raise a family. She operated a modeling agency in Milan for several years and has continued to work as a model.

== Early life ==
Cleveland was born in New York City in 1950 to Johnny Johnston, a jazz saxophonist of Irish and Swedish ancestry, and Lady Bird Cleveland, an artist of African-American, Native-American and Irish-Scottish ancestry. Her parents separated when she was young, and she was raised by her mother in Harlem. She studied performing arts at Fiorello H. LaGuardia High School and studied design at New York's High School of Art and Design and hoped to become a fashion designer.

Some of her earliest photographs as a youngster were taken by Carl Van Vechten, who was among her mother's coterie of artist friends. Cleveland noted in her book Walking with the Muses: A Memoir that her first photographs were taken when she was fourteen by Van Vechten's friend Adelaide Passen, one of the first women employed as a press photographer in the United States.

== Career ==
=== Early modeling career ===
Cleveland's career as a model began in 1966, aged 16, when she was on a subway platform with a friend en route to class and was noticed by the assistant to Carrie Donovan, fashion editor at Vogue. Donovan, impressed by Cleveland's fashionable clothing, invited her to tour the Vogue offices and the magazine subsequently published a feature on her as an up-and-coming young designer. The article led to her being approached by Ebony which asked Cleveland if she would perform as a model for its Fashion Fair national runway tour. Cleveland agreed and decided she would place her aspirations to be a designer on hold and try her luck as a fashion model.

Following her tour with Ebony, in which she experienced acts of violent racism in the Southern United States, Cleveland caught the attention of designers such as Jacques Tiffeau and Stephen Burrows. At age 18, she was signed to Wilhelmina Models after designer Oleg Cassini initially recommended her to Eileen Ford. Cleveland has stated that Ford had rejected her based on her race.

=== Rise to prominence ===
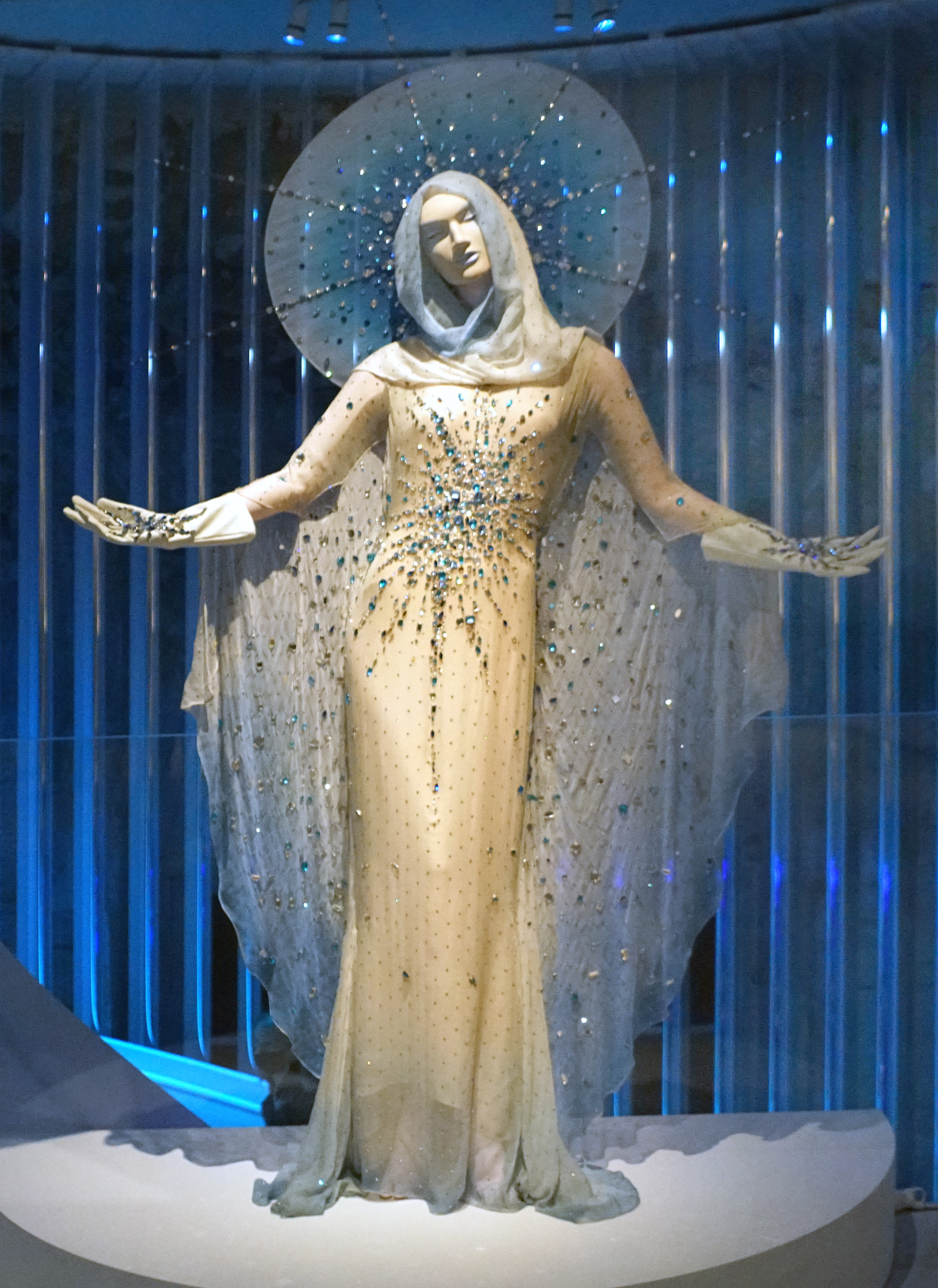
robe and cape, part of the "Winter of Angels - 10 Years" collection ready-to-wear Autumn-Winter 1984-1985 by Thierry Mugler, worn by Cleveland during the final scene of the fashion show at the Zénith Paris

Soon she was meeting and working with many of the fashion industry's top enterprising people of the era, including Diana Vreeland and being photographed by Irving Penn, Steven Meisel, Richard Avedon, Christopher Makos, and Andy Warhol and briefly became a muse to Salvador Dalí. She made her first appearance as a fashion model in American Vogue in June 1970, photographed by Berry Berenson and the same year, appeared in the very first issue of Essence magazine. Despite her early success, Cleveland grew disillusioned with America and what she perceived to be its racist attitudes towards Black models. She relocated to Paris at the suggestion of fashion illustrator Antonio Lopez in 1971, and soon became a house model for Karl Lagerfeld, who was the main designer at Chloé. Cleveland vowed not to return to the United States until a Black model appeared on the cover of American Vogue.

The pinnacle of her success in Europe was her participation in the November 28, 1973 Battle of Versailles Fashion Show; a gala event initially conceived as a publicity stunt and fundraiser held at Théâtre Gabriel for the then-dilapidated Palace of Versailles. The gala, which pitted five French designers: Yves Saint Laurent, Hubert de Givenchy, Pierre Cardin, Emanuel Ungaro and Christian Dior's Marc Bohan, against five American designers: Bill Blass, Oscar de la Renta, Anne Klein, Halston and Stephen Burrows in a fashion showdown. The event became an international fashion extravaganza with style writers and society columnists, wealthy socialites, royalty, tycoons and politicians in attendance. Cleveland was one of 36 models to walk the runway for the event. Of the 36 models, ten were Black, an unprecedented number for the era. The gala later was chronicled in the 2015 Pulitzer Prize winning The Battle of Versailles: The Night American Fashion Stumbled into the Spotlight and Made History by Robin Givhan.

After Beverly Johnson became the first black model to appear on the cover of American Vogue in August 1974, Cleveland returned to the United States and continued her modeling career. In the 1970s, she appeared on the cover of Vanity Fair, Interview, Essence, Harper's, Cosmopolitan, Women’s Wear Daily, L'Officiel, The Sunday Times Magazine, GQ, Vogue Paris, W, and Elle. She modeled for designers such as Valentino, Oscar de la Renta, Yves Saint Laurent, Thierry Mugler, Diane von Furstenberg, and Christian Dior. With Karen Bjornson, Anjelica Huston, Alva Chinn, Elsa Peretti, and Pat Ast, among others, she became one of Halston's favored troupe of models, nicknamed the Halstonettes. Halston called Cleveland "the greatest walking mannequin in the business."

During the mid to late 1970s, Cleveland and her fiancé Sterling St. Jacques were a famous dancing couple. Dubbed by People magazine as the "hottest couple in America," they were comparable to Fred Astaire and Ginger Rogers. They danced together at all the top New York nightclubs, including Hurrah, Regine's, and Studio 54. In 1976, they appeared in the sexually explicit Broadway play Let My People Come, which was only shown at the Morosco Theater. They were a fixture at New York's exclusive Studio 54, often in the company of friends such as Halston, Jerry Hall, Grace Jones, and Andy Warhol.

=== Return to modeling ===
After raising two children, Cleveland sporadically returned to modeling. In 1995, she started her own modeling agency in Milan. In 2003, Cleveland and her daughter Anna walked for Chanel at Paris Fashion Week. In 2010, she appeared as a guest judge on the reality television series and interactive competition America's Next Top Model.

In 2013, she made an appearance on The Face, a modeling-themed reality television show hosted by model Naomi Campbell. That year, she appeared in an ad campaign for MAC Cosmetics with models Jerry Hall and Marisa Berenson that was launched in dedication to fashion illustrator Antonio Lopez, who died of AIDS in 1987, who had been close friends with all three models and instrumental in their early careers.

In 2014, she walked the runway for Moschino's Spring Collection in Milan and appeared on the cover of Numéro Russia, shot and styled by Tom Ford. In 2015, she returned to New York Fashion Week to walk the runway for Zac Posen, who also hired her and her daughter Anna to showcase his June 2015 resort collection, appeared in Vogue Japan and appeared in an ad campaign for Barneys New York. Both Cleveland and her daughter Anna were chosen for a 2015 ad campaign for French multinational high fashion house Lanvin.

In 2016, she walked the runway for H&M during Paris Fashion Week and appeared on the cover of Vogue Italia with her family. She also appeared in editorials for Harper's Bazaar Japan and Vogue Spain. In February 2019, at age 68, she walked the runway for Hellessy and Naeem Khan at New York Fashion Week with former Halstonettes Karen Bjornson and Alva Chinn, and in March of the same year, she walked the runway along with Beverly Johnson and Grace Jones at Paris Fashion Week for Tommy Hilfiger. In September 2019, she returned to the runway 6 months after being diagnosed with colon cancer, walking for the 2020 Spring Season shows for designers Nicole Miller and Chiara Boni.

== Personal life ==
Cleveland had a six-year on-and-off affair with actor Warren Beatty. She was engaged to dancer and model Sterling St. Jacques. In 1978, she married model Martin Snaric; the two later divorced. In 1982, she married Dutch former model and fashion photographer Paul van Ravenstein, with whom she has two children, Noel van Ravenstein (born 1984) and Anna Cleveland van Ravenstein (born 1989), who also became a fashion model.

In 2016, she wrote Walking with the Muses: A Memoir, covering her early life in Harlem and her career in the fashion industry. The book was published by Atria Publishing Group, 37 Ink, Simon & Schuster. In addition to her writing, running her business, and public appearances, Cleveland is also on a quest to get her mother, Ladybird Cleveland's art accepted into the Smithsonian Institution. Cleveland is a devotee of Gurumayi Chidvilasananda, the current spiritual head of the Siddha Yoga path.

In March 2019, days after walking the runway for the Tommy Hilfiger show at Paris Fashion Week, Cleveland was rushed to the American Hospital of Paris after falling ill. She underwent emergency surgery on March 23 after French doctors discovered she had colon cancer. Shortly after her surgery, Cleveland's husband announced that she did not have enough medical insurance to cover the cost of the surgery. A public donation page was established by van Ravenstein on a crowdfunding platform to help pay for Cleveland's medical expenses. Donations were made from many individuals within the fashion industry, including designers Anna Sui, Kim Jones, Marc Jacobs, Zac Posen, Thierry Mugler, Kimora Lee Simmons, and Elsa Peretti; models Carla Bruni, Helena Christensen, Marisa Berenson, Marpessa Hennink, and Lineisy Montero; photographers Inez van Lamsweerde, Vinoodh Matadin, Roxanne Lowit, and Steven Klein; stylist and fashion journalist Katie Grand; and businesswoman and DJ Marjorie Gubelmann. She made a full recovery after 12 rounds of chemotherapy and had her colon removed.

Cleveland lives with her husband near Morristown, New Jersey.

== Legacy ==
Cleveland is recognized as one of the first Black supermodels. Fashion editor André Leon Talley described her as "the all-time superstar model" in an article for the July 1980 issue of Ebony magazine. Talley also referred to Cleveland as "the first Black supermodel, the Josephine Baker of the international runways" in his 2003 published memoir A.L.T.: A Memoir.

== In popular culture ==
In 2010, Cleveland appeared in the documentary Ultrasuede, In Search of Halston.

In 2012, Cleveland appeared in two fashion documentaries, Versailles ’73: American Runway Revolution and Timothy Greenfield-Sanders' About Face: Supermodels Then and Now.

In 2019, she appeared in the documentary film Halston.

In 2021, Cleveland was played by model and actress Dilone in the five-part Netflix miniseries biographical drama Halston, which chronicled the life of Cleveland's longtime friend, designer Halston.

In 2025, Cleveland was interviewed for the upcoming documentary Gloss And Grit: The Man Who Made Art Pop about the life and work of artist Richard Bernstein.

== See also ==
- List of people from Harlem
