= 2019–20 Real Betis season =

Real Betis
2019–20 season
- President: Ángel Haro
- Head coach: Rubi (until 21 June); Alexis Trujillo (from 21 June)
- Stadium: Benito Villamarín
- La Liga: 15th
- Copa del Rey: Round of 32
- Top goalscorer: League: Loren (10); All: Loren (12)
- Biggest win: Real Betis 3–1 Levante
- Biggest defeat: Villarreal 5–1 Real Betis
Home colours	Away colours	Third colours

The 2019–20 season was Real Betis's 112th season in existence and the club's 5th consecutive season in the top flight of Spanish football. It covered a period from 1 July 2019 to 30 June 2020. Real Betis competed in La Liga and Copa del Rey.

== Players ==
As of 14 January 2020.

Note: Flags indicate national team as defined under FIFA eligibility rules; some limited exceptions apply. Players may hold more than one non-FIFA nationality.

No.	Pos.	Nation	Player
1	GK	ESP	Joel Robles
2	DF	ESP	Francis
3	MF	ESP	Javi García
4	DF	MAR	Zouhair Feddal
5	DF	ESP	Marc Bartra
6	DF	ESP	Alfonso Pedraza (on loan from Villarreal)
7	FW	ESP	Juanmi
8	MF	FRA	Nabil Fekir
9	FW	ESP	Borja Iglesias
10	MF	ESP	Sergio Canales
11	MF	ESP	Cristian Tello (4th captain)
12	DF	BRA	Sidnei

No.	Pos.	Nation	Player
13	GK	ESP	Dani Martín
14	MF	POR	William Carvalho
15	DF	ESP	Álex Moreno
16	FW	ESP	Loren
17	MF	ESP	Joaquín (captain)
18	MF	MEX	Andrés Guardado (3rd captain)
19	DF	ESP	Antonio Barragán
20	MF	MEX	Diego Lainez
21	MF	ARG	Guido Rodríguez
22	DF	BRA	Emerson
23	DF	ALG	Aïssa Mandi (vice-captain)
24	MF	ESP	Carles Aleñá (on loan from Barcelona)

=== Reserve team ===
Note: Flags indicate national team as defined under FIFA eligibility rules; some limited exceptions apply. Players may hold more than one non-FIFA nationality.

No.	Pos.	Nation	Player
30	GK	ESP	Daniel Rebollo
31	GK	ESP	Carlos Marín

No.	Pos.	Nation	Player
32	DF	ESP	Edgar González
35	FW	ESP	Raúl

=== Out on loan ===
Note: Flags indicate national team as defined under FIFA eligibility rules; some limited exceptions apply. Players may hold more than one non-FIFA nationality.

No.	Pos.	Nation	Player
—	MF	ESP	Ismael (at (Spain) Alavés until 30 June 2020)
—	MF	ESP	Víctor Camarasa (at (Spain) Alavés until 30 June 2020)
—	MF	ESP	Julio Gracia (at (Spain) Badajoz until 30 June 2020)
—	MF	ARG	Giovani Lo Celso (at (England) Tottenham Hotspur until 30 June 2020)
—	FW	FRA	Yassin Fekir (at (Spain) CD Guijuelo until 30 June 2020)

No.	Pos.	Nation	Player
—	MF	CMR	Wilfrid Kaptoum (at (Spain) Almería until 30 June 2020)
—	MF	COL	Juanjo Narváez (at (Spain) Las Palmas until 30 June 2020)
—	FW	ESP	Aitor Ruibal (at (Spain) Leganés until 30 June 2020)
—	FW	PAR	Antonio Sanabria (at (Italy) Genoa until 30 June 2020)

== Transfers ==
=== In ===
Date	Player	From	Type	Fee	Ref
30 June 2019	(Spain) Álex Alegría	Sporting Gijón	Loan return		
30 June 2019	(Algeria) Ryad Boudebouz	Celta Vigo	Loan return		
30 June 2019	(Serbia) Darko Brašanac	Alavés	Loan return		
30 June 2019	(Spain) Víctor Camarasa	(Wales) Cardiff City	Loan return		
30 June 2019	(Japan) Takashi Inui	Alavés	Loan return		
30 June 2019	(Colombia) Juanjo Narváez	Almería	Loan return		
30 June 2019	(Romania) Alin Toșca	(Greece) PAOK	Loan return		
1 July 2019	(Brazil) Emerson Royal	Barcelona	Transfer	€6,000,000	
1 July 2019	(Spain) Juanmi	Real Sociedad	Transfer	€8,000,000	
1 July 2019	(Argentina) Giovani Lo Celso	(France) Paris Saint-Germain	Buyout clause	€25,000,000	
16 July 2019	(Spain) Alfonso Pedraza	Villarreal	Loan		
18 July 2019	(Spain) Dani Martín	Sporting Gijón	Transfer	€5,000,000	
22 July 2019	(France) Nabil Fekir	(France) Lyon	Transfer	€20,000,000	
22 July 2019	(France) Yassin Fekir	(France) Lyon II	Transfer	Undisclosed	
14 August 2019	(Spain) Borja Iglesias	Espanyol	Transfer	€28M	
14 August 2019	(Spain) Álex Moreno	Rayo Vallecano	Transfer	€7M	
2 January 2020	(Spain) Carles Aleñá	Barcelona	Loan		
11 January 2020	(Argentina) Guido Rodríguez	(Mexico) América	Transfer	€4,500,000	
14 January 2020	(Spain) Víctor Camarasa	(England) Crystal Palace	Loan return		

=== Out ===
Date	Player	To	Type	Fee	Ref
30 June 2019	(Brazil) Emerson Royal	(Brazil) Atlético Mineiro	Loan return		
30 June 2019	(Spain) Jesé	(France) Paris Saint-Germain	Loan return		
1 July 2019	(Spain) Sergio León	Levante	Transfer	€4,000,000	
2 July 2019	(Spain) Álex Alegría	Mallorca	Transfer	Free	
4 July 2019	(Spain) Aitor Ruibal	Leganés	Loan		
10 July 2019	(Spain) Pau López	(Italy) Roma	Transfer	€23,500,000	
20 July 2019	(Romania) Alin Toșca	(Turkey) Gazişehir Gaziantep	Transfer	Free	
22 July 2019	(Serbia) Darko Brašanac	Osasuna	Transfer	Undisclosed	
24 July 2019	(Japan) Takashi Inui	Eibar	Transfer	€2,000,000	
27 July 2019	(Algeria) Ryad Boudebouz	(France) Saint-Étienne	Transfer	€3.5M	
4 August 2019	(Spain) Junior Firpo	Barcelona	Transfer	€18,000,000	
7 August 2019	(Spain) Víctor Camarasa	(England) Crystal Palace	Loan		
8 August 2019	(Argentina) Giovani Lo Celso	(England) Tottenham Hotspur	Loan	€18,000,000	
31 August 2019	(Colombia) Juanjo Narváez	Las Palmas	Loan		
10 January 2020	(Cameroon) Wilfrid Kaptoum	Almería	Loan	€500,000	
14 January 2020	(Spain) Víctor Camarasa	Alavés	Loan		
31 January 2020	(Spain) Francis	Almería	Loan		

== Pre-season and friendlies ==
Win Draw Loss

12 July 2019 Friendly	Real Betis	0–1	Sheffield United	Algarve, Portugal
21:00 WEST (UTC+1)	García (yellow card) 15'	Report	McGoldrick 63'; Jagielka (yellow card) 79'	Stadium: Estádio Algarve

19 July 2019 Iberian Cup	Porto	1–1 (5–4 p)	Real Betis	Portimão, Portugal
20:30 WEST (UTC+1)	Zé Luís 31'; Soares (yellow card) 88'	Report	Juanmi 13'	Stadium: Estádio Municipal de Portimão; Referee: António Nobre
	Penalties
	Telles (penalty scored); Soares (penalty scored); Marcano (penalty scored); B. Costa (penalty scored); Danilo (penalty scored)		(penalty scored) Joaquín; (penalty scored) Boudebouz; (penalty scored) Abreu; (penalty missed) Bartra; (penalty scored) Barragán

21 July 2019 Iberian Cup	Real Betis	2–1	Portimonense	Seville, Spain
12:30 CEST (UTC+2)	Raúl 17'; Joaquín 51'	Report	Paulinho 71'	Stadium: Estadio Benito Villamarín

25 July 2019 Friendly	Querétaro	0–2	Real Betis	Querétaro City, Mexico
21:00 CDT (UTC−5)		Report	Emerson 83'; Kaptoum 87'	Stadium: Estadio Corregidora

28 July 2019 Friendly	Puebla	2–0	Real Betis	Puebla, Mexico
19:00 CDT (UTC−5)	Alustiza 4'; Emerson 13' (o.g.); Zavala (yellow card) 26'; Cavallini (yellow card) 81'	Report	Guardado (yellow card) 27'	Stadium: Estadio Cuauhtémoc

4 August 2019 Friendly	Raja Casablanca	0–1	Real Betis	Casablanca, Morocco
18:00 CET (UTC+1)	El Wardi (yellow card) 66'	Report	Raúl 88'	Stadium: Stade Mohammed V

7 August 2019 Friendly	Real Betis	1–0	Las Palmas	Seville, Spain
19:00 CEST (UTC+2)	Fekir 16'	Report	Timor (yellow card) 67'	Stadium: Estadio Benito Villamarín

10 August 2019 Friendly	Deportivo La Coruña	1–0	Real Betis	A Coruña, Spain
17:00 CEST (UTC+2)	Bóveda 64'	Report	Pedraza (yellow card) 87'	Stadium: Estadio Riazor

== Competitions ==
Win Draw Loss

=== Overall ===
Competition	First match	Last match	Starting round	Final position	Record							
Competition	First match	Last match	Starting round	Final position	Pld	W	D	L	GF	GA	GD	Win %
La Liga	18 August 2019	19 July 2020	Matchday 1	15th	38	10	11	17	48	60	−12	26.32
Copa del Rey	19 December 2019	23 January 2020	First round	Round of 32	3	2	1	0	9	2	+7	66.67
Total					41	12	12	17	57	62	−5	29.27

Last updated: 19 July 2020
Source: Soccerway

=== La Liga ===
==== League table ====
Pos	Team	Pld	W	D	L	GF	GA	GD	Pts
13	Valladolid	38	9	15	14	32	43	−11	42
14	Eibar	38	11	9	18	39	56	−17	42
15	Real Betis	38	10	11	17	48	60	−12	41
16	Alavés	38	10	9	19	34	59	−25	39
17	Celta Vigo	38	7	16	15	37	49	−12	37

Source: La Liga, Soccerway
Rules for classification: 1) Points; 2) Head-to-head points; 3) Head-to-head goal difference; 4) Goal difference; 5) Goals scored; 6) Fair-play points (Note: Head-to-head record is used only after all the matches between the teams in question have been played)

==== Results summary ====
Overall								Home						Away					
Pld	W	D	L	GF	GA	GD	Pts	W	D	L	GF	GA	GD	W	D	L	GF	GA	GD
38	10	11	17	48	60	−12	41	9	4	6	34	27	+7	1	7	11	14	33	−19

Last updated: 19 July 2020.
Source: La Liga

==== Results by round ====
Round	1	2	3	4	5	6	7	8	9	10	11	12	13	14	15	16	17	18	19	20	21	22	23	24	25	26	27	28	29	30	31	32	33	34	35	36	37	38
Ground	H	A	H	H	A	H	A	H	A	A	H	A	H	H	A	H	A	H	A	H	A	A	H	A	H	A	H	A	H	A	H	A	H	A	H	A	H	A
Result	L	L	W	D	D	W	L	D	L	L	W	D	L	W	W	W	D	L	D	W	L	D	L	D	D	L	W	L	D	L	W	L	L	D	W	L	L	L
Position	18	20	15	15	15	9	15	16	18	18	16	17	17	15	12	11	12	13	13	11	12	12	13	12	13	14	12	13	14	14	13	13	13	14	13	13	14	15

Source: La Liga
A = Away; H = Home; W = Win; D = Draw; L = Loss

==== Matches ====
The La Liga schedule was announced on 4 July 2019.

18 August 2019 1	Real Betis	1–2	Valladolid	Seville
21:00 CEST (UTC+2)	Robles (red card) 8'; Emerson (yellow card) 27'; Loren 68'; Pedraza (yellow card) 90+2'	Report	Plano (yellow card) 36', (goal) 89'; Antoñito (yellow card) 40'; Alcaraz (yellow card) 45'; Moyano (yellow card) 59'; Guardiola 63'; Míchel (yellow card) 90+2'; Anuar (yellow card) 90+3'	Stadium: Benito Villamarín; Attendance: 49,554; Referee: Santiago Jaime Latre

25 August 2019 2	Barcelona	5–2	Real Betis	Barcelona
21:00 CEST (UTC+2)	Piqué (yellow card) 32'; Griezmann 41', 50'; Pérez 56'; Alba 60'; Vidal 77'	Report	Fekir 15'; Loren 79'; Carvalho (yellow card) 90'	Stadium: Camp Nou; Attendance: 79,160; Referee: José Luis González González

31 August 2019 3	Real Betis	2–1	Leganés	Seville
21:00 CEST (UTC+2)	Mandi (yellow card) 49'; Loren 54'; Fekir 61', (yellow card) 90+4'; Canales (yellow card) 83'; Carvalho (yellow card) 90+7'	Report	Mesa (yellow card) 19'; Braithwaite 50'; Silva (yellow card) 68'	Stadium: Benito Villamarín; Attendance: 45,894; Referee: Guillermo Cuadra Fernández

15 September 2019 4	Real Betis	1–1	Getafe	Seville
21:00 CEST (UTC+2)	Mandi (yellow card) 9'; Barragán (yellow card) 13'; Carvalho (red card) 25'; Fekir (yellow card) 53'; Joaquín 73' (pen.); Loren (red card) 90+4'	Report	Mata 15' (pen.); Jason (yellow card) 36'; Nyom (yellow card) 50'; Arambarri (yellow card) 52'; Suárez (yellow card) 74'; Djené (yellow card) 78'; Cucurella (yellow card) 85'	Stadium: Benito Villamarín; Attendance: 47,884; Referee: José Luis González González

20 September 2019 5	Osasuna	0–0	Real Betis	Pamplona
21:00 CEST (UTC+2)	Sanjurjo (yellow card) 9'	Report	Mandi (yellow card) 4'; Guardado (yellow card) 24'	Stadium: El Sadar Stadium; Attendance: 15,698; Referee: Carlos del Cerro Grande

24 September 2019 6	Real Betis	3–1	Levante	Seville
20:00 CEST (UTC+2)	Loren (yellow card) 25', (goal) 45+3', 48'; Carvalho (yellow card) 63'; Iglesias 67'	Report	Hernâni 7'; Vukčević (yellow card) 29'; Coke (yellow card) 57'	Stadium: Benito Villamarín; Attendance: 44,560; Referee: Eduardo Prieto Iglesias

27 September 2019 7	Villarreal	5–1	Real Betis	Villarreal
21:00 CEST (UTC+2)	Gómez (yellow card) 22'; Toko Ekambi 39', 76'; Quintillà (yellow card) 63'; Cazorla 68' (pen.); Gerard 90+2'; Chukwueze 90+4'	Report	Emerson 48'; Joaquín (yellow card) 53'; Feddal (yellow card) 66'	Stadium: Estadio de la Cerámica; Attendance: 18,176; Referee: Xavier Estrada Fernández

4 October 2019 8	Real Betis	1–1	Eibar	Seville
21:00 CEST (UTC+2)	Canales (yellow card) 33'; Loren 69'; Fekir (yellow card) 79'; Mandi (yellow card) 88'	Report	Bigas (yellow card) 9'; Orellana 34' (pen.); Arbilla (yellow card) 57'; Escalante (yellow card) 65' (yellow-red card) 90+1'; Tejero (yellow card) 76'; Diop (yellow card) 80'	Stadium: Benito Villamarín; Attendance: 46,143; Referee: Alejandro Hernández Hernández

20 October 2019 9	Real Sociedad	3–1	Real Betis	San Sebastián
14:00 CEST (UTC+2)	García 22' (o.g.); Guevara (yellow card) 28'; Willian José 36'; Portu 58'; Le Normand (yellow card) 85'; Zubeldia (yellow card) 86'; Ødegaard (yellow card) 90+2'	Report	Loren 12'; García (yellow card) 63'; Joaquín (yellow card) 79'	Stadium: Anoeta; Attendance: 28,032; Referee: César Soto Grado

27 October 2019 10	Granada	1–0	Real Betis	Granada
14:00 CET (UTC+1)	Machís (yellow card) 9'; Herrera (yellow card) 24'; Vadillo 61'; Soldado (yellow card) 75'	Report	García (yellow card) 12'; Fekir (yellow card) 29'; Feddal (yellow card) 45'; Joaquín (yellow card) 80'	Stadium: Nuevo Estadio de Los Cármenes; Attendance: 18,985; Referee: Antonio Mateu Lahoz

30 October 2019 11	Real Betis	2–1	Celta Vigo	Seville
21:00 CET (UTC+1)	Emerson 8', (yellow card) 80'; Feddal (yellow card) 50'; Guardado (yellow card) 64'; Ismael (yellow card) 67'; Iglesias (yellow card) 69'; Fekir 90'; Robles (yellow card) 90+3'	Report	Aspas 69' (pen.); Araujo (yellow card) 90+2'	Stadium: Benito Villamarín; Attendance: 42,578; Referee: Jesús Gil Manzano

2 November 2019 12	Real Madrid	0–0	Real Betis	Madrid
21:00 CET (UTC+1)	Casemiro (yellow card) 39'; Mendy (yellow card) 80'	Report	Bartra (yellow card) 11'; Robles (yellow card) 65'; Feddal (yellow card) 74'; Guardado (yellow card) 85'	Stadium: Santiago Bernabéu Stadium; Attendance: 70,375; Referee: José María Sánchez Martínez

10 November 2019 13	Real Betis	1–2	Sevilla	Seville
21:00 CET (UTC+1)	Feddal (yellow card) 12'; Loren 45'; Emerson (yellow card) 66'	Report	Ocampos 13', (yellow card) 37'; Óliver (yellow card) 19'; De Jong 55'; Fernando (yellow card) 71'	Stadium: Benito Villamarín; Attendance: 52,123; Referee: Alejandro Hernández Hernández

23 November 2019 14	Real Betis	2–1	Valencia	Seville
16:00 CET (UTC+1)	González (yellow card) 32'; Joaquín 37'; Moreno (yellow card) 64'; Canales 90+3'	Report	Gómez 32'; Wass (yellow card) 57'; Gayà (yellow card) 90+3'	Stadium: Benito Villamarín; Attendance: 45,562; Referee: Ricardo de Burgos Bengoetxea

30 November 2019 15	Mallorca	1–2	Real Betis	Palma
18:30 CET (UTC+1)	Lumor (yellow card) 45' (yellow-red card) 90+1'; Kubo (yellow card) 46'; Junior 55' (pen.)	Report	Joaquín 7' (pen.); Guardado (yellow card) 27'; Fekir 33'; Emerson (yellow card) 45+1'; Loren (yellow card) 53'; Mandi (yellow card) 67'	Stadium: Son Moix Stadium; Attendance: 16,051; Referee: Juan Martínez Munuera

8 December 2019 16	Real Betis	3–2	Athletic Bilbao	Seville
14:00 CET (UTC+1)	Joaquín 2', 11', 20'; Kaptoum (yellow card) 74'; Guardado (yellow card) 90+4'	Report	Williams 44' (pen.), (yellow card) 77'; Núñez (yellow card) 46'; Berchiche 75'; San José (yellow card) 86'; López (yellow card) 90+6'	Stadium: Benito Villamarín; Attendance: 45,322; Referee: Valentín Pizarro Gómez

15 December 2019 17	Espanyol	2–2	Real Betis	Cornellà de Llobregat
16:00 CET (UTC+1)	Granero (yellow card) 15'; Darder 19'; Calero (yellow card) 31'; Espinosa 41', (yellow card) 85'; Ferreyra (yellow card) 90+3'	Report	Iglesias 4'; Bartra 68'; Feddal (yellow card) 80'	Stadium: RCDE Stadium; Attendance: 22,248; Referee: Guillermo Cuadra Fernández

22 December 2019 18	Real Betis	1–2	Atlético Madrid	Seville
16:00 CET (UTC+1)	Mandi (yellow card) 51'; Bartra (yellow card) 80', (goal) 90+3'	Report	Félix (yellow card) 42'; Thomas (yellow card) 55'; Correa 58'; Morata (yellow card) 67', (goal) 84'	Stadium: Benito Villamarín; Attendance: 52,017; Referee: Xavier Estrada Fernández

5 January 2020 19	Alavés	1–1	Real Betis	Vitoria-Gasteiz
16:00 CET (UTC+1)	Vidal 14'; Joselu (yellow card) 22'; Wakaso (yellow card) 34'; Duarte (yellow card) 45'; García (yellow card) 45'; Navarro (yellow card) 45+3'; Rioja (yellow card) 67'; Aguirregabiria (yellow card) 90+2'	Report	Fekir (yellow card) 33'; Canales (yellow card) 45+4'; Emerson 55'; Feddal (red card) 78'; Bartra (yellow card) 90+5'	Stadium: Mendizorrotza Stadium; Attendance: 13,875; Referee: Antonio Mateu Lahoz

19 January 2020 20	Real Betis	3–0	Real Sociedad	Seville
14:00 CET (UTC+1)	Guardado (yellow card) 23'; Iglesias 27'; Joaquín 44'; Moreno (yellow card) 69'; Emerson (yellow card) 90+1'; Canales 90+5'	Report	Llorente (yellow card) 16'	Stadium: Benito Villamarín; Attendance: 51,171; Referee: Adrián Cordero Vega

26 January 2020 21	Getafe	1–0	Real Betis	Getafe
17:00 CET (UTC+1)	Maksimović (yellow card) 49'; Etxeita (yellow card) 74'; Ángel 89' (pen.)	Report	Canales (yellow card) 56'; Bartra (yellow card) 63'; Robles (yellow card) 73'; Mandi (yellow card) 88'; Feddal (red card) 90+5'	Stadium: Coliseum Alfonso Pérez; Attendance: 13,244; Referee: Eduardo Prieto Iglesias

2 February 2020 22	Eibar	1–1	Real Betis	Eibar
14:00 CET (UTC+1)	Orellana 15' (pen.), (yellow card) 18'; Burgos (yellow card) 33'	Report	Fekir 7'; González (yellow card) 14'; Sidnei (yellow card) 27'	Stadium: Ipurua Municipal Stadium; Attendance: 6,558; Referee: Juan Martínez Munuera

9 February 2020 23	Real Betis	2–3	Barcelona	Seville
21:00 CET (UTC+1)	Canales 6' (pen.); Fekir 26', (yellow card) 76' (yellow-red card) 76'; Emerson (yellow card) 36'; Mandi (yellow card) 45+2'; Joaquín (yellow card) 72'	Report	Lenglet (yellow card) 5' (yellow-red card) 79', (goal) 72'; De Jong 9'; Roberto (yellow card) 29'; Vidal (yellow card) 32'; Busquets 45+3', (yellow card) 57'	Stadium: Benito Villamarín; Attendance: 54,526; Referee: José María Sánchez Martínez

16 February 2020 24	Leganés	0–0	Real Betis	Leganés
14:00 CET (UTC+1)	Braithwaite (yellow card) 66'; Pérez (yellow card) 74'; Ruibal (yellow card) 87'; Gil (yellow card) 87'; Óscar (yellow card) 90+4'	Report	Emerson (yellow card) 26'; Rodríguez (yellow card) 36'; Carvalho (yellow card) 76'; Iglesias (red card) 90+3'	Stadium: Estadio Municipal de Butarque; Attendance: 11,160; Referee: Xavier Estrada Fernández

21 February 2020 25	Real Betis	3–3	Mallorca	Seville
21:00 CET (UTC+1)	Canales 19' (pen.); Fekir 35' (pen.); Joaquín 48'; Bartra (yellow card) 68'; Aleñá (yellow card) 90+4'	Report	Hernández 16'; Budimir 27'; Gámez (yellow card) 58'; Kubo 70'	Stadium: Benito Villamarín; Attendance: 47,231; Referee: Jesús Gil Manzano

29 February 2020 26	Valencia	2–1	Real Betis	Valencia
16:00 CET (UTC+1)	Kondogbia (yellow card) 35'; Gameiro 60'; Gayà (yellow card) 87'; Parejo 89'	Report	Moreno (yellow card) 32'; Emerson (yellow card) 76'; Guardado (yellow card) 80'; Loren 90+3'	Stadium: Mestalla; Attendance: 37,418; Referee: Adrián Cordero Vega

8 March 2020 27	Real Betis	2–1	Real Madrid	Seville
21:00 CET (UTC+1)	Sidnei 40'; Guardado (yellow card) 74'; Tello 82'	Report	Benzema 45+3' (pen.); Marcelo (yellow card) 55'	Stadium: Benito Villamarín; Attendance: 51,521; Referee: José Luis González González

11 June 2020 28	Sevilla	2–0	Real Betis	Seville
22:00 CEST (UTC+2)	Ocampos 56' (pen.); Fernando 62'	Report	Emerson (yellow card) 49'; Bartra (yellow card) 54'	Stadium: Ramón Sánchez Pizjuán Stadium; Attendance: 0 Referee: Antonio Mateu Lahoz
Note: The match was originally scheduled for 15 March, but was postponed due to the COVID-19 pandemic, and rescheduled to 11 June. It was played behind closed doors.

15 June 2020 29	Real Betis	2–2	Granada	Seville
22:00 CEST (UTC+2)	González (yellow card) 23'; Pedraza (yellow card) 65'; Canales 84' (pen.); Tello 88'	Report	Fernández 29'; Vallejo (yellow card) 41'; Germán (yellow card) 52'; Foulquier (yellow card) 67'; Soldado 90+1'; Silva (yellow card) 90+4'	Stadium: Benito Villamarín; Attendance: 0 Referee: César Soto Grado
Note: The match was originally scheduled for 22 March, but was postponed due to the COVID-19 pandemic, and rescheduled to 15 June. It was played behind closed doors.

20 June 2020 30	Athletic Bilbao	1–0	Real Betis	Bilbao
17:00 CEST (UTC+2)	Martínez 7', (yellow card) 84'; Berchiche (yellow card) 14'; Muniain (yellow card) 36'; D. García (yellow card) 89'	Report		Stadium: San Mamés Stadium; Attendance: 0 Referee: Valentín Pizarro Gómez
Note: The match was originally scheduled for 5 April, but was postponed due to the COVID-19 pandemic, and rescheduled to 20 June. It was played behind closed doors.

25 June 2020 31	Real Betis	1–0	Espanyol	Seville
22:00 CEST (UTC+2)	Rodríguez (yellow card) 28'; Bartra 48'; Pedraza (yellow card) 69'; Iglesias (yellow card) 76'; Emerson (yellow card) 82'	Report	Pipa (yellow card) 10'; Pedrosa (yellow card) 35'; Naldo (yellow card) 73'; Darder (yellow card) 79'	Stadium: Benito Villamarín; Attendance: 0 Referee: Juan Martínez Munuera
Note: The match was originally scheduled for 12 April, but was postponed due to the COVID-19 pandemic, and rescheduled to 25 June. It was played behind closed doors.

28 June 2020 32	Levante	4–2	Real Betis	La Nucia
14:00 CEST (UTC+2)	Mayoral 21'; Bardhi 35'; Morales 50'; Rochina 59'	Report	Feddal (yellow card) 40'; Barragán (yellow card) 45+2'; Canales 70'; Carvalho (yellow card) 84'; Juanmi 87'; Iglesias (yellow card) 90'	Stadium: Camilo Cano; Attendance: 0 Referee: Santiago Jaime Latre
Note: The match was originally scheduled for 22 April, but was postponed due to the COVID-19 pandemic, and rescheduled to 28 June. It was played behind closed doors.

1 July 2020 33	Real Betis	0–2	Villarreal	Seville
22:00 CEST (UTC+2)	Bartra (yellow card) 5'; Fekir (yellow card) 45+1' (yellow-red card) 45+3'; Rodríguez (yellow card) 81'	Report	Gerard 7' (pen.), 30'; Moreno (yellow card) 69'	Stadium: Benito Villamarín; Attendance: 0 Referee: Jesús Gil Manzano
Note: The match was originally scheduled for 26 April, but was postponed due to the COVID-19 pandemic, and rescheduled to 1 July. It was played behind closed doors.

4 July 2020 34	Celta Vigo	1–1	Real Betis	Vigo
17:00 CEST (UTC+2)	Nolito 22'; Kevin (yellow card) 62'; Aspas (yellow card) 64'; Araujo (yellow card) 78'; Yokuşlu (yellow card) 82'; Bradarić (yellow card) 86'	Report	Moreno (yellow card) 21'; Mandi (yellow card) 55'; Tello (yellow card) 72'; Canales (yellow card) 75'; Feddal 79'	Stadium: Balaídos; Attendance: 0 Referee: Pablo González Fuertes
Note: The match was originally scheduled for 3 May, but was postponed due to the COVID-19 pandemic, and rescheduled to 4 July. It was played behind closed doors.

8 July 2020 35	Real Betis	3–0	Osasuna	Seville
20:30 CEST (UTC+2)	Rodríguez 4'; Pedraza 25'; Carvalho (yellow card) 75'; Aleñá 90+7'	Report	D. García (yellow card) 12'; Aridane (yellow card) 16'; Mérida (yellow card) 60'; Estupiñán (yellow card) 62'; Lato (yellow card) 66'	Stadium: Benito Villamarín; Attendance: 0 Referee: Alejandro Hernández Hernández
Note: The match was originally scheduled for 10 May, but was postponed due to the COVID-19 pandemic. and rescheduled to 8 July. It was played behind closed doors.

11 July 2020 36	Atlético Madrid	1–0	Real Betis	Madrid
22:00 CEST (UTC+2)	Savić (yellow card) 11'; Hermoso (red card) 57'; Costa 74'	Report	Barragán (yellow card) 45+1'; Feddal (yellow card) 80'; Emerson (yellow card) 90+3'	Stadium: Wanda Metropolitano; Attendance: 0 Referee: José Luis González González
Note: The match was originally scheduled for 13 May, but was postponed due to the COVID-19 pandemic, and rescheduled to 11 July. It was played behind closed doors.

16 July 2020 37	Real Betis	1–2	Alavés	Seville
21:00 CEST (UTC+2)	Joaquín (yellow card) 36'; Feddal (yellow card) 75'; Moreno (yellow card) 81'; Rodríguez (yellow card) 87'; Juanmi (yellow card) 90' (yellow-red card) 90'; Loren 90+3'	Report	Joselu (yellow card) 23', (goal) 51'; Tachi (yellow card) 55'; Méndez (yellow card) 62'; Roberto (yellow card) 71'; Ely 76', (red card) 90+5'	Stadium: Benito Villamarín; Attendance: 0 Referee: David Medié Jiménez
Note: The match was originally scheduled for 17 May, but was postponed due to the COVID-19 pandemic, and rescheduled to 16 July. It was played behind closed doors.

19 July 2020 38	Valladolid	2–0	Real Betis	Valladolid
18:30 CEST (UTC+2)	Guardiola 45+1'; Plano 63', (yellow card) 88'; Moyano (yellow card) 81'	Report	Bartra (yellow card) 41'; Fekir (yellow card) 85'	Stadium: Estadio José Zorrilla; Attendance: 0 Referee: Santiago Jaime Latre
Note: The match was originally scheduled for 24 May, but was postponed due to the COVID-19 pandemic, and rescheduled to 19 July. It was played behind closed doors.

=== Copa del Rey ===
19 December 2019 First round	Atlético Antoniano	0–4	Real Betis	Seville (Note: Atlético Antoniano played at Benito Villamarín, stadium of Real Betis, instead of their regular stadium Municipal, in Lebrija, after mutual agreement between both clubs and official approval from the Royal Spanish Football Federation.)
19:00 CET (UTC+1)	Chamizo Romero (yellow card) 17'; Gómez (yellow card) 51'; Gil (yellow card) 54'	Report	Tello 14' (pen.); Kaptoum 25'; Barragán (yellow card) 36'; Lainez 53'; Meléndez 80'	Stadium: Benito Villamarín; Attendance: 12,223; Referee: Jesús Gil Manzano

11 January 2020 Second round	Portugalete	0–3	Real Betis	Portugalete
16:00 CET (UTC+1)	Isuardi (yellow card) 67'; Santamaria (yellow card) 72'; Artabe (yellow card) 80'	Report	Moreno 23'; Aleñá (yellow card) 44'; Loren 48'; Joaquín 90'	Stadium: Estadio La Florida; Attendance: 4,985; Referee: Eduardo Prieto Iglesias

23 January 2020 Round of 32	Rayo Vallecano	2–2 (a.e.t.) (4–2 p)	Real Betis	Madrid
21:00 CET (UTC+1)	Montiel (yellow card) 26'; Catena 47', (yellow card) 62'; Valentín (yellow card) 58'; Trejo (yellow card) 58'; Suárez (yellow card) 108'; Saúl (yellow card) 113'; Martín 118'	Report	Aleñá (yellow card) 38'; Bartra (yellow card) 63'; Joaquín 84'; Feddal (yellow card) 94'; Loren 97'; Tello (yellow card) 114'	Stadium: Vallecas; Attendance: 11,800; Referee: Ricardo de Burgos Bengoetxea
	Penalties
	Suárez (penalty scored); Pozo (penalty scored); Saúl (penalty scored); Catena (penalty scored)		(penalty missed) Joaquín; (penalty scored) Loren; (penalty scored) Aleñá; (penalty missed) Tello

== Statistics ==
=== Appearances and goals ===
Last updated on the end of the season.

No.	Pos	Nat	Player	Total		La Liga		Copa del Rey	
No.	Pos	Nat	Player	Apps	Goals	Apps	Goals	Apps	Goals
Goalkeepers
1	GK	(Spain) ESP	Joel Robles	34	0	33	0	1	0
13	GK	(Spain) ESP	Dani Martín	8	0	5+1	0	2	0
Defenders
4	DF	(Morocco) MAR	Zouhair Feddal	18	1	16+1	1	1	0
5	DF	(Spain) ESP	Marc Bartra	33	3	29+1	3	2+1	0
12	DF	(Brazil) BRA	Sidnei	15	1	14	1	1	0
15	DF	(Spain) ESP	Álex Moreno	30	1	23+5	0	2	1
19	DF	(Spain) ESP	Antonio Barragán	14	0	7+5	0	2	0
22	DF	(Brazil) BRA	Emerson	34	3	32+1	3	1	0
23	DF	(Algeria) ALG	Aïssa Mandi	30	0	29	0	1	0
32	DF	(Spain) ESP	Edgar González	13	0	9+1	0	2+1	0
Midfielders
3	MF	(Spain) ESP	Javi García	9	0	4+4	0	1	0
6	MF	(Spain) ESP	Alfonso Pedraza	21	1	15+6	1	0	0
10	MF	(Spain) ESP	Sergio Canales	37	6	36	6	1	0
11	MF	(Spain) ESP	Cristian Tello	30	3	5+22	2	2+1	1
14	MF	(Portugal) POR	William Carvalho	13	0	11+2	0	0	0
17	MF	(Spain) ESP	Joaquín	36	10	25+9	8	0+2	2
18	MF	(Mexico) MEX	Andrés Guardado	30	0	25+3	0	1+1	0
20	MF	(Mexico) MEX	Diego Lainez	18	1	2+13	0	3	1
21	MF	(Argentina) ARG	Guido Rodríguez	15	1	11+3	1	1	0
24	MF	(Spain) ESP	Carles Aleñá	19	1	7+10	1	2	0
34	MF	(Spain) ESP	Álex Meléndez	1	1	0	0	0+1	1
Forwards
7	FW	(Spain) ESP	Juanmi	8	1	2+6	1	0	0
8	FW	(France) FRA	Nabil Fekir	33	7	31+1	7	1	0
9	FW	(Spain) ESP	Borja Iglesias	37	3	21+14	3	2	0
16	FW	(Spain) ESP	Loren	39	12	21+15	10	1+2	2
35	FW	(Spain) ESP	Raúl	3	0	0+3	0	0	0
Players who have made an appearance or had a squad number this season but have left the club either permanently or on loan
2	DF	(Spain) ESP	Francis	1	0	0	0	1	0
21	MF	(Cameroon) CMR	Wilfrid Kaptoum	6	1	2+3	0	1	1
24	MF	(Colombia) COL	Juanjo Narváez	0	0	0	0	0	0
37	MF	(Spain) ESP	Ismael	4	0	1+2	0	1	0
