= 2022–23 Torino FC season =

Torino
2022–23 season
- Owner: Urbano Cairo
- Chairman: Urbano Cairo
- Head coach: Ivan Jurić
- Stadium: Stadio Olimpico Grande Torino
- Serie A: 10th
- Coppa Italia: Quarter-finals
- Top goalscorer: League: Antonio Sanabria (12); All: Antonio Sanabria (12)
Home colours	Away colours	Third colours

The 2022–23 season was the 112th season in the history of Torino Football Club and their 11th consecutive season in the top flight. The club participated in Serie A and the Coppa Italia.

== Players ==
As of 31 January 2023

Note: Flags indicate national team as defined under FIFA eligibility rules; some limited exceptions apply. Players may hold more than one non-FIFA nationality.

No.	Pos.	Nation	Player
1	GK	ALB	Etrit Berisha
2	MF	FRA	Brian Bayeye
3	DF	NED	Perr Schuurs
4	DF	ITA	Alessandro Buongiorno
5	DF	GLP	Andreaw Gravillon (on loan from Reims)
6	DF	CZE	David Zima
7	FW	FRA	Yann Karamoh
8	MF	SRB	Ivan Ilić (on loan from Hellas Verona)
9	FW	PAR	Antonio Sanabria
11	FW	ITA	Pietro Pellegri
13	DF	SUI	Ricardo Rodriguez (Captain)
14	MF	ENG	Ronaldo Vieira (on loan from Sampdoria)
16	MF	CRO	Nikola Vlašić (on loan from West Ham United)
17	DF	CIV	Wilfried Singo
19	MF	AUT	Valentino Lazaro (on loan from Inter Milan)
21	MF	FRA	Michel Ndary Adopo

No.	Pos.	Nation	Player
23	MF	SEN	Demba Seck
26	DF	CIV	Koffi Djidji
27	DF	KOS	Mërgim Vojvoda
28	MF	ITA	Samuele Ricci
32	GK	SRB	Vanja Milinković-Savić
33	DF	ENG	Sebas Wade
34	DF	NGR	Ola Aina
49	FW	SRB	Nemanja Radonjić (on loan from Marseille)
59	MF	RUS	Aleksei Miranchuk (on loan from Atalanta)
66	MF	LTU	Gvidas Gineitis
73	GK	ITA	Matteo Fiorenza
77	MF	POL	Karol Linetty
78	DF	ROU	Andrei Anton
89	GK	ITA	Luca Gemello
94	DF	FRA	Ange Caumenan N'Guessan

=== Out on loan ===
As of 31 January 2023

Note: Flags indicate national team as defined under FIFA eligibility rules; some limited exceptions apply. Players may hold more than one non-FIFA nationality.

No.	Pos.	Nation	Player
—	DF	ITA	Christian Celesia (at Messina until 30 June 2023)
—	DF	ITA	Armando Izzo (at Monza until 30 June 2023)
—	MF	ITA	Tommaso Di Marco (at Virtus Francavilla until 30 June 2023)
—	MF	NZL	Matthew Garbett (at NAC Breda until 30 June 2023)
—	MF	TUR	Emirhan İlkhan (at Sampdoria until 30 June 2023)
—	MF	HUN	Krisztofer Horváth (at Kecskemét until 30 June 2023)

No.	Pos.	Nation	Player
—	MF	CIV	Ben Lhassine Kone (at Frosinone until 30 June 2023)
—	MF	ITA	Simone Verdi (at Hellas Verona until 30 June 2023)
—	MF	DEN	Magnus Warming (at Darmstadt 98 until 30 June 2023)
—	FW	MDA	Lado Akhalaia (at Swift Hesperange until 30 June 2023)
—	FW	ITA	Nicola Rauti (at SPAL until 30 June 2023)
—	FW	ITA	Samuele Vianni (at Piacenza until 30 June 2023)

== Pre-season and friendlies ==
Win Draw Loss

15 July 2022 Friendly	Eintracht Frankfurt (Germany)	3–1	(Italy) Torino	Bad Wimsbach, Austria
14:30 CEST (UTC+2)	Touré 9'; Lindstrøm 47'; Alario 63'	Report	Horváth 83'	Stadium: Hofmaninger-Stadion

19 July 2022 Friendly	Torino (Italy)	2–0	(Czech Republic) Mladá Boleslav	Perg, Austria
18:30 CEST (UTC+2)	Buongiorno (yellow card) 22'; Lukić 34'; Horváth 90'	Report	Mareček (yellow card) 70'	Stadium: Wimtech Arena; Referee: Rene Felix Kettlgruber (Austria)

23 July 2022 Friendly	Trabzonspor (Turkey)	0–3	(Italy) Torino	Waidring, Austria
18:00 CEST (UTC+2)		Report	Radonjić 20', 22'; Zima (yellow card) 41'; Seck 55'; Vojvoda (yellow card) 85'	Stadium: Sportstadion Langau; Referee: Ali Mutlu (Austria)

27 July 2022 Friendly	Torino (Italy)	1–0	(Cyprus) Apollon Limassol	Seekirchen am Wallersee, Austria
18:00 CEST (UTC+2)	Sanabria 85'	Report		Stadium: Sportzentrum Seekirchen

30 July 2022 Friendly	Nice (France)	1–0	(Italy) Torino	Nice, France
17:00 CEST (UTC+2)	Bard (yellow card) 37'; Dante (yellow card) 63'; Stengs 78'	Report		Stadium: Allianz Riviera; Attendance: 11,032; Referee: Pierre Gaillouste (France)

10 December 2022 Friendly	Espanyol (Spain)	0–1	(Italy) Torino	San Pedro del Pinatar, Spain
16:00 CET (UTC+1)			Miranchuk 39'	Stadium: Pinatar Arena Football Center

16 December 2022 Friendly	Almería (Spain)	1–1	(Italy) Torino	San Pedro del Pinatar, Spain
17:00 CET (UTC+1)	Ramazani 88'		Schuurs 36'	Stadium: Pinatar Arena

23 December 2022 Friendly	Torino (Italy)	0–0	(Italy) Cremonese	Turin, Italy
14:30 CET (UTC+1)				Stadium: Stadio Olimpico Grande Torino

28 December 2022 Friendly	Monza (Italy)	1–4	(Italy) Torino	Monza
16:00 CET (UTC+1)	Caprari 74' (pen.)		Marlon 26' (o.g.); Vojvoda 37'; Vlašić 66', 68'	Stadium: U-Power Stadium

== Competitions ==
=== Overall record ===
Competition	First match	Last match	Starting round	Final position	Record							
Competition	First match	Last match	Starting round	Final position	Pld	W	D	L	GF	GA	GD	Win %
Serie A	13 August 2022	3 June 2023	Matchday 1	10th	38	14	11	13	42	41	+1	36.84
Coppa Italia	6 August 2022	1 February 2023	Round of 64	Quarter-finals	4	3	0	1	9	2	+7	75.00
Total					42	17	11	14	51	43	+8	40.48

Source: Soccerway

=== Serie A ===
==== League table ====
Pos	Team	Pld	W	D	L	GF	GA	GD	Pts	Qualification or relegation
8	Fiorentina	38	15	11	12	53	43	+10	56	Qualification for the Εuropa Conference League play-off round
9	Bologna	38	14	12	12	53	49	+4	54	
10	Torino	38	14	11	13	42	41	+1	53	
11	Monza	38	14	10	14	48	52	−4	52	
12	Udinese	38	11	13	14	47	48	−1	46	

Source: Serie A
Rules for classification: 1) Points; 2) Tiebreaker for Champions team and third relegated team; 3) Head-to-head points; 4) Head-to-head goal difference; 5) Goal difference; 6) Goals scored; 7) Draw. (Note: Head-to-head record is used only after all the matches between the teams in question have been played)

==== Results summary ====
Overall								Home						Away					
Pld	W	D	L	GF	GA	GD	Pts	W	D	L	GF	GA	GD	W	D	L	GF	GA	GD
38	14	11	13	42	41	+1	53	5	7	7	15	19	−4	9	4	6	27	22	+5

Source: Serie A

==== Results by round ====
Round	1	2	3	4	5	6	7	8	9	10	11	12	13	14	15	16	17	18	19	20	21	22	23	24	25	26	27	28	29	30	31	32	33	34	35	36	37	38
Ground	A	H	A	A	H	A	H	A	H	H	A	H	A	H	A	H	A	H	A	A	H	A	H	A	H	A	H	A	H	H	A	H	A	H	A	H	A	H
Result	W	D	W	L	W	L	L	L	D	L	W	W	L	W	D	D	D	L	W	D	W	L	D	L	W	W	L	D	L	D	W	L	W	D	W	D	W	L
Position	6	9	5	8	6	9	9	10	10	11	10	9	11	9	9	9	10	9	8	8	7	8	9	10	9	8	11	11	11	11	11	12	11	11	10	10	8	10

Source: Serie A
A = Away; H = Home; W = Win; D = Draw; L = Loss

==== Matches ====
The league fixtures were announced on 24 June 2022.

13 August 2022 1	Monza	1–2	Torino	Monza
20:45 CEST (UTC+2)	Marí (yellow card) 61'; Mota 90+5'	Report	Singo (yellow card) 19'; Adopo (yellow card) 36'; Miranchuk 43'; Sanabria 66'	Stadium: Stadio Brianteo; Attendance: 10,739; Referee: Maurizio Mariani

20 August 2022 2	Torino	0–0	Lazio	Turin
18:30 CEST (UTC+2)		Report	Cataldi (yellow card) 49'; Antônio (yellow card) 73'; Lazzari (yellow card) 90+3'; Milinković-Savić (yellow card) 90+4'; Immobile (yellow card) 90+4'	Stadium: Stadio Olimpico Grande Torino; Attendance: 16,530; Referee: Marco Piccinini

27 August 2022 3	Cremonese	1–2	Torino	Cremona
18:30 CEST (UTC+2)	Sernicola 80'	Report	Vlašić 18'; Aina (yellow card) 54'; Buongiorno (yellow card) 64'; Radonjić 65'; Linetty (yellow card) 81'	Stadium: Stadio Giovanni Zini; Attendance: 11,572; Referee: Paolo Valeri

1 September 2022 4	Atalanta	3–1	Torino	Bergamo
20:45 CEST (UTC+2)	Zappacosta (yellow card) 41'; Koopmeiners 45+4' (pen.), 47', 84' (pen.)	Report	Aina (yellow card) 19'; Buongiorno (yellow card) 46'; Vlašić 77', (yellow card) 83'	Stadium: Gewiss Stadium; Attendance: 17,928; Referee: Marco Di Bello

5 September 2022 5	Torino	1–0	Lecce	Turin
20:45 CEST (UTC+2)	Vlašić 40'; İlkhan (yellow card) 53'; Schuurs (yellow card) 56'	Report	Hjulmand (yellow card) 53'	Stadium: Stadio Olimpico Grande Torino; Attendance: 19,087; Referee: Manuel Volpi

10 September 2022 6	Internazionale	1–0	Torino	Milan
18:00 CEST (UTC+2)	Brozović (yellow card) 55', (goal) 89'	Report	Sanabria (yellow card) 51'; Lukić (yellow card) 68'	Stadium: San Siro; Attendance: 69,134; Referee: Giovanni Ayroldi

17 September 2022 7	Torino	0–1	Sassuolo	Turin
20:45 CEST (UTC+2)	Buongiorno (yellow card) 10'; Lazaro (yellow card) 45+1'; Singo (yellow card) 57'; Linetty (yellow card) 84'	Report	Lopez (yellow card) 69'; Álvarez 90+3'	Stadium: Stadio Olimpico Grande Torino; Attendance: 14,822; Referee: Niccolò Baroni

1 October 2022 8	Napoli	3–1	Torino	Naples
15:00 CEST (UTC+2)	Zambo Anguissa 6', 12'; Kvaratskhelia 37'	Report	Sanabria 44'; Singo (yellow card) 70'; Lukić (yellow card) 74'	Stadium: Stadio Diego Armando Maradona; Attendance: 35,953; Referee: Luca Massimi

9 October 2022 9	Torino	1–1	Empoli	Turin
12:30 CEST (UTC+2)	Sanabria (yellow card) 14'; Pellegri (yellow card) 80'; Lukić 90'	Report	Bandinelli (yellow card) 25'; Destro 49'; Parisi (yellow card) 56'; Marin (yellow card) 80'; Vicario (yellow card) 90+5'	Stadium: Stadio Olimpico Grande Torino; Attendance: 16,793; Referee: Francesco Fourneau

15 October 2022 10	Torino	0–1	Juventus	Turin
18:00 CEST (UTC+2)	Linetty (yellow card) 60'; Lazaro (yellow card) 90+4'	Report	Vlahović 74'	Stadium: Stadio Olimpico Grande Torino; Attendance: 22,269; Referee: Maurizio Mariani

23 October 2022 11	Udinese	1–2	Torino	Udine
12:30 CEST (UTC+2)	Deulofeu 26'; Success (yellow card) 32'; Bijol (yellow card) 85'	Report	Aina 14', (yellow card) 68'; Lazaro (yellow card) 34'; Pellegri 69'; Milinković-Savić (yellow card) 71'; Linetty (yellow card) 86'	Stadium: Stadio Friuli; Attendance: 20,711; Referee: Matteo Marchetti

30 October 2022 12	Torino	2–1	Milan	Turin
20:45 CET (UTC+1)	Schuurs (yellow card) 24'; Buongiorno (yellow card) 30'; Djidji 35'; Miranchuk 37'; Pellegri (yellow card) 71'; Linetty (yellow card) 87'; Lukić (yellow card) 90'	Report	Kalulu (yellow card) 35'; Messias 67'; Pobega (yellow card) 77'	Stadium: Stadio Olimpico Grande Torino; Attendance: 26,133; Referee: Rosario Abisso

6 November 2022 13	Bologna	2–1	Torino	Bologna
12:30 CET (UTC+1)	Lukumí (yellow card) 24'; Orsolini 64'; Posch 77'; Vignato (yellow card) 77'; Skorupski (yellow card) 90+5'	Report	Lukić 26' (pen.); Milinković-Savić (yellow card) 73'; Ricci (yellow card) 85'; Vojvoda (yellow card) 90+3'	Stadium: Stadio Renato Dall'Ara; Attendance: 23,168; Referee: Antonio Giua

9 November 2022 14	Torino	2–0	Sampdoria	Turin
20:45 CET (UTC+1)	Ricci (yellow card) 7'; Radonjić 29'; Vlašić 59'	Report	Amione (yellow card) 20'; Yepes (yellow card) 52'; Colley (yellow card) 81'	Stadium: Stadio Olimpico Grande Torino; Attendance: 15,593; Referee: Davide Massa

13 November 2022 15	Roma	1–1	Torino	Rome
15:00 CET (UTC+1)	Camara (yellow card) 53'; Dybala (yellow card) 86'; Tahirović (yellow card) 89'; Belotti (penalty missed) 90+2'; Matić 90+4'	Report	Buongiorno (yellow card) 48'; Linetty 55'; Lazaro (yellow card) 90+5'	Stadium: Stadio Olimpico; Attendance: 61,168; Referee: Antonio Rapuano

4 January 2023 16	Torino	1–1	Hellas Verona	Turin
14:30 CET (UTC+1)	Miranchuk 64'; Schuurs (yellow card) 89'	Report	Đurić 45'; Dawidowicz (yellow card) 90+5'	Stadium: Stadio Olimpico Grande Torino; Attendance: 15,845; Referee: Federico Dionisi

8 January 2023 17	Salernitana	1–1	Torino	Salerno
12:30 CET (UTC+1)	Candreva (yellow card) 22'; Vilhena 49'; Daniliuc (yellow card) 68'	Report	Linetty (yellow card) 25'; Sanabria 36'; Lukić (yellow card) 51'; Djidji (yellow card) 77'	Stadium: Stadio Arechi; Attendance: 16,300; Referee: Andrea Colombo

15 January 2023 18	Torino	0–1	Spezia	Turin
15:00 CET (UTC+1)	Djidji (yellow card) 28'; Ricci (yellow card) 76'	Report	Nzola 28' (pen.); Caldara (yellow card) 51'; Bourabia (yellow card) 61'; Nikolaou (yellow card) 90+7'	Stadium: Stadio Olimpico Grande Torino; Attendance: 15,113; Referee: Davide Ghersini

21 January 2023 19	Fiorentina	0–1	Torino	Florence
20:45 CET (UTC+1)	Saponara (yellow card) 45'; Duncan (yellow card) 50'	Report	Miranchuk 33'; Ricci (yellow card) 45'; Sanabria (yellow card) 88'	Stadium: Stadio Artemio Franchi; Attendance: 29,281; Referee: Federico Dionisi

28 January 2023 20	Empoli	2–2	Torino	Empoli
15:00 CET (UTC+1)	Luperto 37'; Akpa Akpro (yellow card) 63'; Marin 69'; Bajrami (yellow card) 78'	Report	Ricci 82'; Sanabria 85'	Stadium: Stadio Carlo Castellani; Attendance: 8,029; Referee: Matteo Marcenaro

5 February 2023 21	Torino	1–0	Udinese	Turin
15:00 CET (UTC+1)	Karamoh 49'; Aina (yellow card) 86'	Report	Lovrić (yellow card) 82'	Stadium: Stadio Olimpico Grande Torino; Attendance: 16,820; Referee: Alessandro Prontera

10 February 2023 22	Milan	1–0	Torino	Milan
20:45 CET (UTC+1)	Kjær (yellow card) 32'; Giroud 62'	Report	Gineitis (yellow card) 32'; Buongiorno (yellow card) 49'; Schuurs (yellow card) 68'; Radonjić (yellow card) 82'	Stadium: San Siro; Attendance: 68,268; Referee: Giovanni Ayroldi

20 February 2023 23	Torino	2–2	Cremonese	Turin
20:45 CET (UTC+1)	Sanabria 41' (pen.), (yellow card) 75'; Aina (yellow card) 66'; Singo 79'; Vojova (yellow card) 90+2'	Report	Tsadjout 54'; Valeri 75'; Buonaiuto (yellow card) 90+4'	Stadium: Stadio Olimpico Grande Torino; Attendance: 19,095; Referee: Giacomo Camplone

28 February 2023 24	Juventus	4–2	Torino	Turin
20:45 CET (UTC+1)	Cuadrado 16'; Danilo 45+1'; Bremer 71'; Rabiot 81'	Report	Karamoh 2'; Sanabria 43'; Rodriguez (yellow card) 60'; Ricci (yellow card) 90+5'	Stadium: Juventus Stadium; Attendance: 37,806; Referee: Daniele Chiffi

6 March 2023 25	Torino	1–0	Bologna	Turin
20:45 CET (UTC+1)	Karamoh 22'; Buongiorno (yellow card) 64'; Vojvoda (yellow card) 80'	Report	Barrow (yellow card) 70'; Schouten (yellow card) 77'	Stadium: Stadio Olimpico Grande Torino; Attendance: 18,592; Referee: Antonio Rapuano

12 March 2023 26	Lecce	0–2	Torino	Lecce
12:30 CET (UTC+1)	Gonzàlez (yellow card) 28'; Strefezza (yellow card) 33'; Hjulmand (yellow card) 44'	Report	Singo 20'; Sanabria 23'; Buongiorno (yellow card) 29'; Milinković-Savić (yellow card) 33'; Ilić (yellow card) 33'	Stadium: Stadio Via del Mare; Attendance: 24,413; Referee: Juan Luca Sacchi

19 March 2023 27	Torino	0–4	Napoli	Turin
15:00 CET (UTC+1)	Gravillon (yellow card) 20'	Report	Osimhen 9', 51'; Kvaratskhelia 35' (pen.); Ndombele 68', (yellow card) 69'	Stadium: Stadio Olimpico Grande Torino; Attendance: 26,058; Referee: Matteo Marchetti

3 April 2023 28	Sassuolo	1–1	Torino	Reggio Emilia
20:45 CEST (UTC+2)	Pinamonti 36'; Frattesi (yellow card) 75'	Report	Sanabria 66'; Linetty (yellow card) 90+5'	Stadium: Mapei Stadium – Città del Tricolore; Attendance: 12,894; Referee: Ivano Pezzuto

8 April 2023 29	Torino	0–1	Roma	Turin
18:30 CEST (UTC+2)	Schuurs (yellow card) 7'; Gineitis (yellow card) 78'; Milinković-Savić (yellow card) 81'	Report	Dybala 8' (pen.); El Shaarawy (yellow card) 11'	Stadium: Stadio Olimpico Grande Torino; Attendance: 22,142; Referee: Andrea Colombo

16 April 2023 30	Torino	1–1	Salernitana	Turin
15:00 CEST (UTC+2)	Sanabria 57'	Report	Vilhena 9'; Gyömbér (yellow card) 68'	Stadium: Stadio Olimpico Grande Torino; Attendance: 21,122; Referee: Gianluca Aureliano

22 April 2023 31	Lazio	0–1	Torino	Rome
18:00 CEST (UTC+2)	Romagnoli (yellow card) 48'; Lazzari (yellow card) 79'	Report	Linetty (yellow card) 25'; Ilić 43'; Rodriguez (yellow card) 62'; Singo (yellow card) 63'; Gravillon (yellow card) 78'	Stadium: Stadio Olimpico; Attendance: 51,000; Referee: Davide Ghersini

29 April 2023 32	Torino	1–2	Atalanta	Turin
20:45 CEST (UTC+2)	Rodriguez (yellow card) 31'; Sanabria 75'	Report	Zappacosta 34'; Palomino (yellow card) 81'; Zapata 88'	Stadium: Stadio Olimpico Grande Torino; Attendance: 20,196; Referee: Juan Luca Sacchi

3 May 2023 33	Sampdoria	0–2	Torino	Genoa
18:00 CEST (UTC+2)	Rincón (yellow card) 23'; Amione (yellow card) 47' (yellow-red card) 90+7'	Report	Buongiorno 31'; Singo (yellow card) 60'; Pellegri 90+4', (yellow card) 90+5'	Stadium: Stadio Luigi Ferraris; Attendance: 16,865; Referee: Giacomo Camplone

7 May 2023 34	Torino	1–1	Monza	Turin
15:00 CEST (UTC+2)	Sanabria 46'; Karamoh (yellow card) 88'; Ricci (yellow card) 90+4'	Report	Carlos Augusto (yellow card) 44'; Caprari 86'	Stadium: Stadio Olimpico Grande Torino; Attendance: 19,517; Referee: Luca Zufferli

14 May 2023 35	Hellas Verona	0–1	Torino	Verona
12:30 CEST (UTC+2)	Tameze (yellow card) 45+2'; Abildgaard (yellow card) 71'; Depaoli (yellow card) 79'	Report	Ilić (yellow card) 25'; Vlašić 29'; Djidji (yellow card) 63'	Stadium: Marcantonio Bentegodi; Attendance: 19,568; Referee: Marco Di Bello

21 May 2023 36	Torino	1–1	Fiorentina	Turin
15:00 CEST (UTC+2)	Singo (yellow card) 60'; Sanabria 66'	Report	Mandragora (yellow card) 19'; Jović 48'; Bianco (yellow card) 77'	Stadium: Stadio Olimpico Grande Torino; Attendance: 20,403; Referee: Luca Massimi

27 May 2023 37	Spezia	0–4	Torino	La Spezia
15:00 CEST (UTC+2)	Ekdal (yellow card) 11'; Nzola (yellow card) 75'	Report	Ilić (yellow card) 16', (goal) 76'; Wiśniewski 24' (o.g.); Singo (yellow card) 69'; Ricci 72'; Karamoh 90+6'	Stadium: Stadio Alberto Picco; Attendance: 10,776; Referee: Marco Guida

3 June 2023 38	Torino	0–1	Internazionale	Turin
18:30 CEST (UTC+2)	Singo (yellow card) 58'	Report	Brozović 37'; Çalhanoğlu (yellow card) 50'; Gosens (yellow card) 68'	Stadium: Stadio Olimpico Grande Torino; Attendance: 24,528; Referee: Michael Fabbri

=== Coppa Italia ===
6 August 2022 Round of 64	Torino	3–0	Palermo	Turin
21:15 CEST (UTC+2)	Lukić 54'; Radonjić 73', (yellow card) 74'; Pellegri 79'	Report		Stadium: Stadio Olimpico Grande Torino; Attendance: 6,803; Referee: Davide Ghersini

18 October 2022 Round of 32	Torino	4–0	Cittadella	Turin
21:00 CEST (UTC+2)	Radonjić 21'; Pellegri 55'; Schuurs 76'; Zima 80'	Report	Danzi (yellow card) 40'	Stadium: Stadio Olimpico Grande Torino; Attendance: 3,297; Referee: Ivano Pezzuto

11 January 2023 Round of 16	Milan	0–1 (a.e.t.)	Torino	Milan
21:00 CET (UTC+1)		Report	Djidji (yellow card) 14' (yellow-red card) 70'; Milinković-Savić (yellow card) 90+2'; Linetty (yellow card) 109'; Adopo 114'	Stadium: San Siro; Attendance: 58,000; Referee: Antonio Rapuano

1 February 2023 Quarter-finals	Fiorentina	2–1	Torino	Florence
18:00 CET (UTC+1)	Jović 65'; Ikoné 90'	Report	Karamoh 90+3'	Stadium: Stadio Artemio Franchi; Attendance: 18,600; Referee: Daniele Doveri
