= Bicho (footballer, born 1996) =

Spanish footballer

Personal information
- Full name: Javier Fernández Abruñedo
- Date of birth: 20 February 1996 (age 30)
- Place of birth: Sada, Spain
- Height: 1.73 m (5 ft 8 in)
- Position: Attacking midfielder

Team information
- Current team: Cultural Leonesa
- Number: 14

Youth career
- 2005–2006: Rayo Sadense
- 2006–2013: Deportivo La Coruña

Senior career*
| Years | Team | Apps | (Gls) |
| 2013–2019 | Deportivo B | 45 | (2) |
| 2013–2019 | Deportivo La Coruña | 6 | (0) |
| 2014–2015 | → Barcelona B (loan) | 19 | (0) |
| 2015–2016 | → Leganés (loan) | 0 | (0) |
| 2016 | → Compostela (loan) | 17 | (3) |
| 2016–2017 | → Racing Ferrol (loan) | 35 | (4) |
| 2020–2021 | Compostela | 20 | (1) |
| 2021–2023 | San Fernando | 61 | (1) |
| 2023– | Cultural Leonesa | 106 | (4) |

International career
| 2012 | Spain U16 | 4 | (0) |
| 2013 | Spain U17 | 3 | (0) |
| 2015 | Spain U19 | 2 | (0) |
- * Club domestic league appearances and goals as of 9 June 2026

Javier Fernández Abruñedo (born 20 February 1996), most known as Bicho, is a Spanish footballer who plays for Primera Federación – Group 1 club Cultural Leonesa as an attacking midfielder.

== Club career ==
Born in Sada, Galicia, Bicho was a youth product of local Deportivo de La Coruña. He made his debuts as a senior with the reserves, representing the side in Tercera División.

Bicho made his official debut for the Galicians' first team on 17 August 2013, playing the last 3 minutes in a 1–0 away win over UD Las Palmas. He spent the remainder of the campaign appearing with the B-side, however.

On 14 July 2014 Bicho joined another reserve team, FC Barcelona B in a two-year loan deal. On 31 August of the following year he was loaned to CD Leganés, for one year. Bicho left Deportivo at the end of the 2018–19 season.

== Career statistics ==
=== Club ===
As of match played 14 February 2021

Appearances and goals by club, season and competition
| Club | Season | League | | | National Cup | | Other | | Total | |
| Club | Season | Division | Apps | Goals | Apps | Goals | Apps | Goals | Apps | Goals |
|---|---|---|---|---|---|---|---|---|---|---|
| Deportivo B | 2012–13 | Tercera División | 6 | 1 | — | | — | | 6 | 1 |
| Deportivo B | 2013–14 | Tercera División | 18 | 1 | — | | — | | 18 | 1 |
| Deportivo B | 2017–18 | Segunda División B | 7 | 0 | — | | 2 (Note: Appearance(s) in Segunda División B Promotion) | 0 | 9 | 0 |
| Deportivo B | 2018–19 | Segunda División B | 14 | 0 | — | | — | | 14 | 0 |
| Deportivo B | Total | | 45 | 2 | 0 | 0 | 2 | 0 | 47 | 2 |
| Deportivo La Coruña | 2013–14 | Segunda División | 6 | 0 | 2 | 0 | — | | 8 | 0 |
| Barcelona B (loan) | 2014–15 | Segunda División | 18 | 0 | — | | — | | 18 | 0 |
| Barcelona B (loan) | 2015–16 | Segunda División B | 1 | 0 | — | | — | | 1 | 0 |
| Barcelona B (loan) | Total | | 19 | 0 | 0 | 0 | 0 | 0 | 19 | 0 |
| Leganés (loan) | 2015–16 | Segunda División | 0 | 0 | 0 | 0 | — | | 0 | 0 |
| Compostela (loan) | 2015–16 | Segunda División B | 17 | 3 | — | | — | | 17 | 3 |
| Racing Ferrol (loan) | 2017–18 | Segunda División B | 35 | 4 | 2 | 0 | — | | 37 | 4 |
| Compostela | 2019–20 | Tercera División | 5 | 1 | — | | — | | 5 | 1 |
| Compostela | 2020–21 | Segunda División B | 10 | 1 | 1 | 0 | — | | 11 | 1 |
| Compostela | Total | | 32 | 5 | 1 | 0 | 0 | 0 | 33 | 5 |
| Career total | | | 137 | 11 | 5 | 0 | 2 | 0 | 144 | 11 |
