= Ale Meléndez =

Spanish footballer

Personal information
- Full name: Alejandro Meléndez Ruiz
- Date of birth: 13 March 1999 (age 27)
- Place of birth: Utrera, Spain
- Height: 1.78 m (5 ft 10 in)
- Position: Attacking midfielder

Team information
- Current team: Ceuta

Youth career
- 2013–2018: Betis

Senior career*
Years	Team	Apps	(Gls)
2017–2020	Betis B	48	(4)
2019	Betis	0	(0)
2020–2021	Badalona	9	(0)
2021	Oviedo B	16	(0)
2021–2022	Linares	36	(1)
2022–2023	Mérida	38	(0)
2023–2024	Ceuta	36	(5)
2024–2026	Albacete	54	(0)
2026–	Ceuta	0	(0)
- * Club domestic league appearances and goals as of 9 June 2026

Alejandro "Ale" Meléndez Ruiz (born 13 May 1999) is a Peruvian footballer who plays as an attacking midfielder for AD Ceuta FC.

== Career ==
Meléndez was born in Utrera, Seville, Andalusia, and was a Real Betis youth graduate. He made his senior debut with the reserves on 20 August 2017, coming on as a late substitute for Loren Morón in a 4–1 Segunda División B home win over CF Lorca Deportiva.

Meléndez scored his first senior goal on 5 May 2019, netting the B's second in a 2–0 Tercera División away win over Coria CF. He made his first team debut on 19 December, replacing fellow youth graduate Ismael Gutiérrez and scoring Betis' fourth in a 4–0 away routing of CA Antoniano, for the season's Copa del Rey.

On 29 July 2020, Meléndez signed for CF Badalona in the third division. The following 28 January, after featuring sparingly, he moved to fellow league team Real Oviedo Vetusta.

On 20 July 2021, Meléndez agreed to a one-year contract with Primera División RFEF side Linares Deportivo. On 13 July of the following year, he joined Mérida AD of the same category.

On 4 July 2023, Meléndez was announced at AD Ceuta FC also in division three. After being an undisputed starter as the club missed out promotion in the play-offs, he signed a two-year deal with Segunda División side Albacete Balompié.

Meléndez made his professional debut on 15 August 2024, replacing Juan Antonio Ros late into a 2–1 away win over Granada CF. On 21 June 2026, he returned to Ceuta on a two-year deal, with the club now also in the second division.
