= 2014–15 FC Barcelona B season =

Barcelona B
2014-2015 season
- President: Josep Maria Bartomeu
- Head Coach: Eusebio Sacristan
- Stadium: Mini Estadi
Home colours	Away colours	Third colours

The 2014–15 season is the Futbol Club Barcelona "B" 45th in existence and the club's 22nd season in Segunda División and 5th consecutive season in the second top flight of Spanish football.

== Season Overview ==
During the summer transfer window, many players like Rodri, Dani Nieto, Javier Espinosa, Edu Bedia departed, while players such as Alen Halilović, Diawandou Diagne, Maxi Rolón and Fabrice Ondoa all joined the club. Despite finishing in third place in 2013–14, the team suffered relegation at the end of the season.

== Players ==
=== Squad information ===
N	Pos.	Nat.	Name	Age	EU	Since	App	Goals	Ends	Transfer fee	Notes
1	GK	(Cameroon)	Fabrice Ondoa	19	Non-EU	2014	0	0	2017	Youth system	
2	DF	(Spain)	Joan Campins	19	EU	2013	1	0	2017	Undiscloed	
3	DF	(Spain)	Álex Grimaldo	19	EU	2012	43	1	2016	Youth system	
4	DF	(Spain)	Patric	22	EU	2012	60	1	2015	Youth system	
5	DF	(Portugal)	Edgar Ié	21	EU	2012	22	0	2016	€1.75M	
6	MF	(Spain)	Sergi Samper	20	EU	2013	43	0	2017	Youth system	
7	FW	(Spain)	Adama Traoré	19	EU	2013	31	5	2015	Youth system	
8	MF	(Spain)	Pol Calvet	21	EU	2013	11	0	2015	Youth system	
9	FW	(Cameroon)	Dongou	20	EU	2012	81	20	2017	Youth system	
10	FW	(Spain)	Joan Román	22	EU	2012	42	7	2015	€1M	
11	FW	(Spain)	Munir El Haddadi	19	EU	2014	11	4	2017	Youth system	Also FC Barcelona Player, No. 31
12	FW	(North Macedonia)	David Babunski	21	EU	2013	21	1	2016	Youth system	
13	GK	(Spain)	Adrián Ortolá	21	EU	2013	11	0	2016	Free	
14	MF	(Spain)	Bicho	19	EU	2014	4	0	2016	Loan	
15	DF	(Cameroon)	Frank Bagnack	20	Non-EU	2014	26	1	2017	Youth system	
16	MF	(Spain)	Gerard Gumbau	20	EU	2014	4	1	2017	€25Th	
17	MF	(Spain)	Juan Cámara	20	EU	2014	2	0	2016	Undisclosed	
18	FW	(Argentina)	Maxi Rolón	20	Non-EU	2014	0	0	2016	Youth system	
19	FW	(Spain)	Sandro Ramírez	19	EU	2013	33	8	2017	Youth system	
20	DF	(Senegal)	Diawandou Diagne	19	Non-EU	2014	4	0	2017	Undisclosed	
21	DF	(Spain)	Sergio Juste	23	EU	2012	1	0	2015	Undisclosed	
22	DF	(Spain)	Lucas Gafarot	20	EU	2013	11	0	2015	Youth system	
23	FW	(Croatia)	Alen Halilović	18	EU	2014	3	0	2019	€2.2M	
24	DF	(Spain)	Robert Costa	21	EU	2013	2	4	2015	Youth system	
25	GK	(Spain)	José Aurelio Suárez	19	EU	2014	0	0	2016	Youth system	
30	MF	(Cameroon)	Wilfrid Kaptoum	19	Non-EU	2013	1	0	2015	Youth system	
	MF	(Portugal)	Agostinho Cá	21	EU	2012	4	0	2016	€1.75M	
	DF	(Nigeria)	Godswill Ekpolo	20	Non-EU	2014	1	0	2017	Youth system	

- Last updated: 14 September 2014
- Source: Barcelona B Staff (Official), Wikipedia players' articles

=== Transfers in ===
No.	Pos.	Nat.	Name	Age	EU	Moving from	Type	Transfer window	Ends	Transfer fee	Source
23	FW	(Croatia)	Alen Halilović	18	EU	Dinamo Zagreb (Croatia)	Transfer	Summer	2019	€2.2M	FCBarcelona.com
16	MF	(Spain)	Gerard Gumbau	19	EU	Girona (Spain)	Transfer	Summer	2017	€25K	
20	DF	(Senegal)	Diawandou Diagne	18	EU	Eupen	Transfer	Summer	2017	Undisclosed	
14	MF	(Spain)	Bicho	18	EU	Deportivo La Coruña	Loan	Summer	2016		
17	MF	(Spain)	Juan Cámara	19	EU	Villarreal B	Transfer	Summer	2016	Undisclosed	

Total expending: ▼€2.23 million

=== Transfers out ===
No.	Pos.	Nat.	Name	Age	EU	Moving to	Type	Transfer window	Transfer fee	Source
–	MF	(Spain)	Denis Suárez	20	EU	Sevilla	Loan (included in Ivan Rakitić transfer)	Summer	N/A	FCBarcelona.com

Total income: ▲€780,000

Total expenditure: ▼€1.45 million
