= List of Torino FC seasons =

Torino FC is an Italian professional football club based in Turin, Piedmont, who play their matches in Stadio Olimpico Grande Torino. The club was formed in 1906 and after bankruptcy was re-founded in 2005. The club's formal debut in an official league was in 1909.

The club has won the Serie A seven times, Serie B three times and the Coppa Italia five times.

Torino has played 90 seasons in the Serie A, 12 seasons in the Serie B, 0 seasons in the Serie C (or equivalent), 0 seasons in the Serie D (or equivalent) and 0 seasons in lower competitions.

This list details the club's achievements in major competitions, and the top scorers for each season. Top scorers in bold were also the top scorers in the Italian league that season. Records of local or regional competitions are not included due to them being considered of less importance.

== Key ==
- Pld = Matches played
- W = Matches won
- D = Matches drawn
- L = Matches lost
- GF = Goals for
- GA = Goals against
- Pts = Points
- Pos = Final position
- Serie A = 1st Tier in Italian League
- Serie B = 2nd Tier in Italian League
- Serie C = 3rd Tier in Italian League
- Prima Categoria = 1st Tier until 1922
- Promozione = 2nd Tier until 1922
- Prima Divisione = 1st Tier until 1926
- Prima Divisione = 2nd Tier (1926–1929)
- Seconda Divisione = 2nd Tier until 1926
- Seconda Divisione = 3rd Tier (1926–1929)
- Divisione Nazionale = 1st Tier (1926–1929)
- RU = Runners-up
- SF = Semi-finals
- QF = Quarter-finals
- R16 = Last 16
- R32 = Last 32
- QR1 = First qualifying round
- QR2 = Second qualifying round
- QR3 = Third qualifying round
- PO = Play-offs
- 1R = Round 1
- 2R = Round 2
- 3R = Round 3
- GS = Group stage
- 2GS = Second group stage
- EC = European Cup (1955–1992)
- UCL = UEFA Champions League (1993–present)
- CWC = UEFA Cup Winners' Cup (1960–1999)
- UC = UEFA Cup (1971–2008)
- UEL = UEFA Europa League (2009–present)
- USC = UEFA Super Cup
- INT = Intercontinental Cup (1960–2004)
- WC = FIFA Club World Cup (2005–present)

| **Champions** | Runners-up | Promoted | Relegated | 1st Tier | 2nd Tier | 3rd Tier | 4th Tier | 5th Tier | 6th Tier | 7th Tier | 8th Tier |

== Seasons ==
Results of league and cup competitions by season
| Season | Division | Pld | W | D | L | GF | GA | Pts | Pos | Cup | Supercoppa Italiana | Cup | Result | Player(s) | Goals |
| Season | League | | | | | | | | | Cup | Supercoppa Italiana | UEFA – FIFA | | Top goalscorer(s) | |
|---|---|---|---|---|---|---|---|---|---|---|---|---|---|---|---|
| 2024–25 | Serie A (1) | 38 | 10 | 14 | 14 | 39 | 45 | 44 | 11th | 2R | | | | Ché Adams | 10 |
| 2023–24 | Serie A (1) | 38 | 13 | 14 | 11 | 36 | 36 | 53 | 9th | R32 | | | | Duván Zapata | 12 |
| 2022–23 | Serie A (1) | 38 | 14 | 11 | 13 | 42 | 41 | 53 | 10th | QF | | | | Antonio Sanabria | 12 |
| 2021–22 | Serie A (1) | 38 | 13 | 11 | 14 | 46 | 41 | 50 | 10th | 2R | | | | Andrea Belotti | 8 |
| 2020–21 | Serie A (1) | 38 | 7 | 16 | 15 | 50 | 69 | 37 | 17th | R16 | | | | Andrea Belotti | 13 |
| 2019–20 | Serie A (1) | 38 | 11 | 7 | 20 | 46 | 68 | 40 | 16th | QF | | UEL | PO | Andrea Belotti | 22 |
| 2018–19 | Serie A (1) | 38 | 16 | 15 | 7 | 52 | 37 | 63 | 7th | R16 | | | | Andrea Belotti | 17 |
| 2017–18 | Serie A (1) | 38 | 13 | 15 | 10 | 54 | 46 | 54 | 9th | QF | | | | Iago Falque | 14 |
| 2016–17 | Serie A (1) | 38 | 13 | 14 | 11 | 71 | 66 | 53 | 9th | R16 | | | | Andrea Belotti | 28 |
| 2015–16 | Serie A (1) | 38 | 12 | 9 | 17 | 52 | 55 | 45 | 12th | R16 | | | | Andrea Belotti | 12 |
| 2014–15 | Serie A (1) | 38 | 14 | 12 | 12 | 48 | 45 | 54 | 9th | R16 | | UEL | R16 | Fabio Quagliarella | 17 |
| 2013–14 | Serie A (1) | 38 | 15 | 12 | 11 | 58 | 48 | 57 | 7th | 3R | | | | Ciro Immobile | 23 |
| 2012–13 | Serie A (1) | 38 | 8 | 16 | 14 | 46 | 55 | 39 | 16th | 4R | | | | Rolando Bianchi | 13 |
| 2011–12 | Serie B (2) | 42 | 24 | 11 | 7 | 57 | 28 | 83 | 2nd | 3R | | | | Mirco Antenucci | 11 |
| 2010–11 | Serie B (2) | 42 | 15 | 13 | 14 | 49 | 48 | 58 | 8th | 3R | | | | Rolando Bianchi | 19 |
| 2009–10 | Serie B (2) | 42 | 19 | 11 | 12 | 53 | 36 | 68 | 5th | 3R | | | | Rolando Bianchi | 27 |
| 2008–09 | Serie A (1) | 38 | 8 | 10 | 20 | 37 | 61 | 34 | 18th | QF | | | | Rolando Bianchi | 10 |
| 2007–08 | Serie A (1) | 38 | 8 | 16 | 14 | 36 | 49 | 40 | 15th | R16 | | | | Alessandro Rosina | 9 |
| 2006–07 | Serie A (1) | 38 | 10 | 10 | 18 | 27 | 47 | 40 | 16th | 2R | | | | Alessandro Rosina | 12 |
| 2005–06 | Serie B (2) | 42 | 21 | 13 | 8 | 51 | 31 | 76 | 3rd | DNP | | | | Alessandro Rosina | 12 |
| 2004–05 | Serie B (2) | 42 | 21 | 11 | 10 | 49 | 31 | 74 | 2nd | R16 | | | | Massimo Marazzina | 20 |
| 2003–04 | Serie B (2) | 46 | 14 | 17 | 15 | 57 | 54 | 59 | 12th | GS | | | | Marco Ferrante | 13 |
| 2002–03 | Serie A (1) | 34 | 4 | 9 | 21 | 23 | 58 | 21 | 18th | 2R | | | | Marco Ferrante | 8 |
| 2001–02 | Serie A (1) | 34 | 10 | 13 | 11 | 37 | 39 | 43 | 11th | 2R | | | | Marco Ferrante | 11 |
| 2000–01 | Serie B (2) | 38 | 22 | 7 | 9 | 48 | 33 | 73 | 1st | R16 | | | | Stefan Schwoch | 16 |
| 1999–2000 | Serie A (1) | 34 | 8 | 12 | 14 | 35 | 47 | 36 | 15th | 2R | | | | Marco Ferrante | 18 |
| 1998–99 | Serie B (2) | 38 | 19 | 8 | 11 | 58 | 36 | 65 | 2nd | 2R | | | | Marco Ferrante | 30 |
| 1997–98 | Serie B (2) | 38 | 17 | 11 | 10 | 50 | 40 | 62 | 5th | 2R | | | | Marco Ferrante | 23 |
| 1996–97 | Serie B (2) | 38 | 13 | 11 | 14 | 45 | 48 | 50 | 9th | 2R | | | | Marco Ferrante | 13 |
| 1995–96 | Serie A (1) | 34 | 6 | 11 | 17 | 28 | 46 | 29 | 16th | 2R | | | | Ruggiero Rizzitelli | 11 |
| 1994–95 | Serie A (1) | 34 | 12 | 9 | 13 | 44 | 48 | 45 | 11th | R16 | | | | Ruggiero Rizzitelli | 20 |
| 1993–94 | Serie A (1) | 34 | 11 | 12 | 11 | 39 | 37 | 34 | 8th | SF | RU | CWC | QF | Andrea Silenzi | 22 |
| 1992–93 | Serie A (1) | 34 | 9 | 17 | 8 | 38 | 38 | 35 | 9th | **W** | | UC | R32 | Carlos Aguilera | 16 |
| 1991–92 | Serie A (1) | 34 | 14 | 15 | 5 | 42 | 20 | 43 | 3rd | QF | | UC | RU | Walter Casagrande | 13 |
| 1990–91 | Serie A (1) | 34 | 12 | 14 | 8 | 40 | 29 | 38 | 5th | QF | | | | Giorgio Bresciani | 13 |
| 1989–90 | Serie B (2) | 38 | 19 | 15 | 4 | 63 | 24 | 53 | 1st | 1R | | | | Müller | 11 |
| 1988–89 | Serie A (1) | 34 | 8 | 11 | 15 | 37 | 49 | 27 | 15th | 2GS | | | | Müller | 12 |
| 1987–88 | Serie A (1) | 30 | 8 | 15 | 7 | 33 | 30 | 31 | 7th | 2GS | | | | Anton Polster | 14 |
| 1986–87 | Serie A (1) | 30 | 8 | 10 | 12 | 26 | 32 | 26 | 11th | R16 | | UC | QF | Wim Kieft | 16 |
| 1985–86 | Serie A (1) | 30 | 11 | 11 | 8 | 31 | 26 | 33 | 5th | QF | | UC | 2R | Antonio Comi | 13 |
| 1984–85 | Serie A (1) | 30 | 14 | 11 | 5 | 36 | 22 | 39 | 2nd | QF | | | | Léo Júnior | 10 |
| 1983–84 | Serie A (1) | 30 | 11 | 11 | 8 | 37 | 30 | 33 | 5th | SF | | | | Walter Schachner | 16 |
| 1982–83 | Serie A (1) | 30 | 9 | 12 | 9 | 30 | 28 | 30 | 8th | SF | | | | Carlo Borghi Franco Selvaggi | 10 |
| 1981–82 | Serie A (1) | 30 | 8 | 11 | 11 | 25 | 30 | 27 | 9th | RU | | | | Alessandro Bonesso Paolo Pulici | 8 |
| 1980–81 | Serie A (1) | 30 | 8 | 10 | 12 | 26 | 29 | 26 | 9th | RU | | UC | R16 | Francesco Graziani | 19 |
| 1979–80 | Serie A (1) | 30 | 11 | 13 | 6 | 26 | 15 | 35 | 3rd | RU | | UC | 1R | Francesco Graziani | 15 |
| 1978–79 | Serie A (1) | 30 | 11 | 14 | 5 | 35 | 23 | 36 | 5th | GS | | UC | 1R | Paolo Pulici | 13 |
| 1977–78 | Serie A (1) | 30 | 14 | 11 | 5 | 36 | 23 | 39 | 3rd | SF | | UC | R16 | Francesco Graziani | 20 |
| 1976–77 | Serie A (1) | 30 | 21 | 8 | 1 | 51 | 14 | 50 | 2nd | GS | | EC | R16 | Francesco Graziani | 23 |
| 1975–76 | Serie A (1) | 30 | 18 | 9 | 3 | 49 | 22 | 47 | **W** | GS | | | | Paolo Pulici | 23 |
| 1974–75 | Serie A (1) | 30 | 11 | 13 | 6 | 40 | 30 | 35 | 6th | 2R | | UC | 1R | Paolo Pulici | 23 |
| 1973–74 | Serie A (1) | 30 | 10 | 14 | 6 | 27 | 24 | 34 | 5th | GS | | UC | 1R | Paolo Pulici | 23 |
| 1972–73 | Serie A (1) | 30 | 11 | 9 | 10 | 33 | 21 | 31 | 6th | GS | | UC | 1R | Paolo Pulici | 18 |
| 1971–72 | Serie A (1) | 30 | 17 | 8 | 5 | 39 | 25 | 42 | 3rd | SF | | CWC | QF | Gianni Bui | 10 |
| 1970–71 | Serie A (1) | 30 | 6 | 14 | 10 | 27 | 30 | 26 | 8th | **W** | | | | Paolo Pulici | 8 |
| 1969–70 | Serie A (1) | 30 | 11 | 8 | 11 | 20 | 31 | 30 | 7th | RU | | | | Giorgio Ferrini | 7 |
| 1968–69 | Serie A (1) | 30 | 11 | 11 | 8 | 33 | 24 | 33 | 6th | 4th | | CWC | QF | Carlo Facchin | 10 |
| 1967–68 | Serie A (1) | 30 | 12 | 10 | 8 | 44 | 31 | 34 | 7th | **W** | | | | Néstor Combin | 13 |
| 1966–67 | Serie A (1) | 34 | 10 | 18 | 6 | 33 | 26 | 38 | 7th | 3R | | | | Néstor Combin Luigi Meroni | 9 |
| 1965–66 | Serie A (1) | 34 | 9 | 13 | 12 | 31 | 34 | 31 | 10th | QF | | UC | 1R | Luigi Meroni | 8 |
| 1964–65 | Serie A (1) | 34 | 16 | 12 | 6 | 48 | 27 | 44 | 3rd | SF | | CWC | SF | Gerry Hitchens Luigi Simoni | 12 |
| 1963–64 | Serie A (1) | 34 | 9 | 17 | 8 | 32 | 32 | 35 | 7th | RU | | | | Joaquín Peiró | 9 |
| 1962–63 | Serie A (1) | 34 | 12 | 10 | 12 | 34 | 38 | 34 | 10th | RU | | | | Gerry Hitchens | 13 |
| 1961–62 | Serie A (1) | 34 | 12 | 12 | 10 | 42 | 40 | 36 | 7th | R16 | | | | Carlo Crippa Denis Law | 10 |
| 1960–61 | Serie A (1) | 34 | 9 | 12 | 13 | 34 | 41 | 30 | 12th | 4th | | | | Giancarlo Danova | 9 |
| 1959–60 | Serie B (2) | 38 | 16 | 19 | 3 | 44 | 21 | 51 | 1st | 4th | | | | Giuseppe Virgili | 24 |
| 1958–59 | Serie A (1) | 34 | 6 | 11 | 17 | 36 | 72 | 23 | 18th | QF | | | | Giuseppe Virgili | 12 |
| 1957–58 | Serie A (1) | 34 | 11 | 11 | 12 | 42 | 49 | 33 | 8th | GS | | | | Dionisio Arce | 12 |
| 1956–57 | Serie A (1) | 34 | 13 | 9 | 12 | 45 | 42 | 35 | 7th | | | | | Gino Armano | 12 |
| 1955–56 | Serie A (1) | 34 | 12 | 9 | 13 | 43 | 45 | 33 | 11th | | | | | Horst Buhtz | 10 |
| 1954–55 | Serie A (1) | 34 | 12 | 10 | 12 | 42 | 45 | 34 | 9th | | | | | Giancarlo Bacci | 15 |
| 1953–54 | Serie A (1) | 34 | 9 | 15 | 10 | 37 | 46 | 33 | 9th | | | | | Horst Buhtz | 11 |
| 1952–53 | Serie A (1) | 34 | 11 | 9 | 14 | 47 | 50 | 31 | 10th | | | | | Andrea Marzani | 9 |
| 1951–52 | Serie A (1) | 38 | 12 | 10 | 16 | 39 | 58 | 34 | 15th | | | | | José Florio | 10 |
| 1950–51 | Serie A (1) | 38 | 9 | 12 | 17 | 46 | 69 | 30 | 17th | | | | | Benjamin Santos | 14 |
| 1949–50 | Serie A (1) | 38 | 17 | 7 | 14 | 80 | 76 | 41 | 6th | | | | | Benjamin Santos | 27 |
| 1948–49 | Serie A (1) | 38 | 25 | 10 | 3 | 78 | 34 | 60 | **W** | | | | | Valentino Mazzola | 16 |
| 1947–48 | Serie A (1) | 40 | 29 | 7 | 4 | 125 | 33 | 65 | **W** | | | | | Valentino Mazzola | 25 |
| 1946–47 | Serie A (1) | 38 | 28 | 7 | 3 | 104 | 35 | 63 | **W** | | | | | Valentino Mazzola | 29 |
| 1945–46 | Serie A Alta Italia (1); Girone Finale (1) | 26; 14 | 19; 11 | 4; 0 | 3; 3 | 65; 43 | 18; 14 | 42; 22 | **W** | | | | | Guglielmo Gabetto | 22 |
| 1944–45 | World War II | | | | | | | | | | | | | | |
| 1943–44 | World War II | | | | | | | | | | | | | | |
| 1942–43 | Serie A (1) | 30 | 20 | 4 | 6 | 68 | 31 | 44 | **W** | **W** | | | | Guglielmo Gabetto | 18 |
| 1941–42 | Serie A (1) | 30 | 16 | 7 | 7 | 60 | 39 | 39 | 2nd | R32 | | | | Guglielmo Gabetto | 17 |
| 1940–41 | Serie A (1) | 30 | 11 | 8 | 11 | 54 | 50 | 30 | 7th | SF | | | | Franco Ossola | 14 |
| 1939–40 | Serie A (1) | 30 | 13 | 7 | 10 | 47 | 41 | 33 | 6th | R16 | | | | Emilio Capri | 11 |
| 1938–39 | Serie A (1) | 30 | 14 | 10 | 6 | 45 | 34 | 38 | 2nd | R16 | | | | Giovanni Gaddoni | 11 |
| 1937–38 | Serie A (1) | 30 | 12 | 8 | 10 | 39 | 37 | 32 | 9th | RU | | | | Fioravante Baldi | 11 |
| 1936–37 | Serie A (1) | 30 | 13 | 12 | 5 | 50 | 25 | 38 | 3rd | R16 | | | | Pietro Buscaglia | 19 |
| 1935–36 | Serie A (1) | 30 | 16 | 6 | 8 | 49 | 33 | 38 | 3rd | **W** | | | | Pietro Buscaglia | 19 |
| 1934–35 | Serie A (1) | 30 | 8 | 9 | 13 | 37 | 45 | 25 | 14th | | | | | Fioravante Baldi | 10 |
| 1933–34 | Serie A (1) | 34 | 9 | 11 | 14 | 47 | 57 | 29 | 13th | | | | | Filippo Prato Onesto Silano | 11 |
| 1932–33 | Serie A (1) | 34 | 14 | 8 | 12 | 65 | 54 | 36 | 7th | | | | | Giovanni Busoni | 18 |
| 1931–32 | Serie A (1) | 34 | 14 | 9 | 11 | 64 | 53 | 37 | 8th | | | | | Gino Rossetti | 17 |
| 1930–31 | Serie A (1) | 34 | 14 | 8 | 12 | 52 | 43 | 36 | 7th | | | | | Julio Libonatti | 14 |
| 1929–30 | Serie A (1) | 34 | 16 | 7 | 11 | 52 | 31 | 39 | 4th | | | | | Gino Rossetti | 17 |
| 1928–29 | Divisione Nazionale Girone A (1) | 30 | 21 | 6 | 3 | 115 | 31 | 48 | 1st | | | | | Gino Rossetti | 36 |
| 1927–28 | Divisione Nazionale Girone A (1); Girone Final (1) | 20; 14 | 14; 8 | 2; 3 | 4; 3 | 78; 33 | 19; 18 | 30; 19 | **W** | | | | | Julio Libonatti | 35 |
| 1926–27 | Divisione Nazionale Girone B (1); Girone Final (1) | 18; 10 | 12; 7 | 2; 0 | 4; 3 | 52; 17 | 25; 15 | 26; 14 | 1st | | | | | Julio Libonatti | 28 |
| 1925–26 | Prima Divisione Lega Nord Girone A (1) | 22 | 16 | 4 | 2 | 67 | 28 | 38 | 2nd | | | | | Adolfo Baloncieri | 20 |
| 1924–25 | Prima Divisione Lega Nord Girone A (1) | 22 | 9 | 6 | 7 | 30 | 25 | 24 | 6th | | | | | Giuseppe Calvi | 8 |
| 1923–24 | Prima Divisione Lega Nord Girone B (1) | 22 | 12 | 6 | 4 | 43 | 22 | 30 | 2nd | | | | | Heinrich Schönfeld | 22 |
| 1922–23 | Prima Divisione Lega Nord Girone A (1) | 22 | 14 | 4 | 4 | 59 | 12 | 32 | 2nd | | | | | Dario Martin | 14 |
| 1921–22 | Prima Divisione Lega Nord Girone B (1) | 22 | 6 | 8 | 8 | 21 | 29 | 20 | 8th | | | | | Aldo Falchi Dario Martin | 5 |
| 1920–21 | Prima Categoria Sezione Piemontese Girone A (1); Semifinali Nazionali | 10; 6 | 7; 4 | 2; 0 | 1; 2 | 25; 13 | 12; 10 | 16; 8 | 2nd 2nd | | | | | Julio Mosso | 10 |
| 1919–20 | Prima Categoria Sezione Piemontese Girone A (1); Semifinali Nazionali Girone C | 10; 10 | 6; 4 | 3; 1 | 1; 5 | 27; 17 | 10; 21 | 15; 9 | 3rd 4th | | | | | Ottavio Boglietti Francisco Mosso | 6 |
| 1919–20 | Prima Categoria Sezione Piemontese Girone A (1); Semifinali Nazionali Girone C | 10; 10 | 6; 4 | 3; 1 | 1; 5 | 27; 17 | 10; 21 | 15; 9 | 3rd 4th | | | | | Ottavio Boglietti Francisco Mosso | 6 |
| 1918–19 | World War I | | | | | | | | | | | | | | |
| 1917–18 | World War I | | | | | | | | | | | | | | |
| 1916–17 | World War I | | | | | | | | | | | | | | |
| 1915–16 | World War I | | | | | | | | | | | | | | |
| 1914–15 | Prima Categoria Sezione Piemontese-Ligure Girone B (1); Semifinali Nazionali Girone C Girone Nazionale | 10; 6; 5 | 9; 6; 1 | 1; 0; 3 | 0; 0; 1 | 37; 18; 11 | 8; 3; 7 | 19; 12; 5 | 1st 1st 2nd | | | | | Carlo Tirone | 16 |
| 1913–14 | Prima Categoria Sezione Piemontese-Ligure (1) | 18 | 12 | 2 | 4 | 74 | 21 | 26 | 4th | | | | | Eugenio Mosso Francisco Mosso | 23 |
| 1912–13 | Prima Categoria Sezione Piemontese (1) | 10 | 5 | 1 | 4 | 35 | 21 | 11 | 3rd | | | | | Guido Debernardi | 10 |
| 1911–12 | Prima Categoria (1) | 18 | 8 | 5 | 5 | 31 | 31 | 21 | 5th | | | | | Adolph Bachmann | 9 |
| 1910–11 | Prima Categoria Ligure-Lombardo-Piemontese (1) | 16 | 9 | 0 | 7 | 33 | 27 | 18 | 3rd | | | | | Adolph Bachmann | 8 |
| 1909–10 | Prima Categoria (1) | 16 | 8 | 1 | 7 | 45 | 30 | 17 | 4th | | | | | Georges Lang | 19 |
| Total | **Serie A, Divisione Nazionale (1)** | **2,817** | **1,122** | **858** | **837** | **4,187** | **3,300** | **3,194 (4,224)** | **7x** **Champ** | **5x** **Coppa** | | | | **Gino Rossetti** | **36** |
| Total | **Serie B (2)** | **484** | **220** | **147** | **117** | **624** | **430** | **772 (807)** | **3x Champ** | | | | | **Marco Ferrante** | **30** |
