= Wilfrid Kaptoum =

Cameroonian footballer

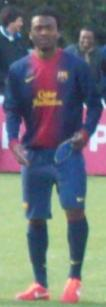
- Kaptoum in 2013

Personal information
- Full name: Wilfrid Jaures Kaptoum
- Date of birth: 7 July 1996 (age 30)
- Place of birth: Douala, Cameroon
- Height: 1.74 m (5 ft 9 in)
- Position: Central midfielder

Team information
- Current team: Cacereño
- Number: 12

Youth career
- Samuel Eto'o Academy
- 2008–2015: Barcelona
- 2009–2010: → Sant Andreu (loan)

Senior career*
Years	Team	Apps	(Gls)
2014–2018	Barcelona B	42	(6)
2015–2016	Barcelona	0	(0)
2018–2019	Betis B	17	(0)
2018–2020	Betis	15	(0)
2020	→ Almería (loan)	8	(0)
2021–2022	New England Revolution	42	(2)
2023	Las Palmas	11	(0)
2023–2024	AEK Larnaca	14	(0)
2024–2025	Panserraikos	7	(0)
2025–2026	Gimnàstic	8	(1)
2026–	Cacereño	7	(0)

International career
2014–2015	Cameroon U20	8	(2)
- * Club domestic league appearances and goals as of 9 June 2026

Wilfrid Jaures Kaptoum (born 7 July 1996) is a Cameroonian professional footballer who plays as a central midfielder for Primera Federación club Cacereño.

== Club career ==
=== Barcelona ===
Born in Douala, Kaptoum joined FC Barcelona's youth ranks in 2008, aged 12, after a stint in Samuel Eto'o's foundation. He was subsequently loaned to neighbouring UE Sant Andreu, and in June 2014 was promoted to the reserves in Segunda División.

Kaptoum played his first match as a professional on 23 August 2014, starting in a 2–0 away loss against CA Osasuna. He scored his first goal on 19 October, netting the second in a 4–1 home win against AD Alcorcón. On 28 October 2015, Kaptoum made his debut for Barcelona's first team, starting in a goalless draw away to CF Villanovense in that season's Copa del Rey.

Kaptoum's first appearance in the UEFA Champions League came on 9 December 2015, in a 1–1 draw away to Leverkusen. In another 1–1 draw game against Valencia CF on 10 February 2016, he scored his debut goal for the first team 2 minutes after coming in as a substitute in the second leg of Copa del Rey semifinals. His goal also served to extend FC Barcelona's unbeaten run to 29 games, breaking the previous record of 28 games set under Pep Guardiola in the 2010–11 season.

Kaptoum sustained a knee injury which kept him out of action for five months. He returned to fitness in December 2017. On 29 January 2018, he agreed to terminate his contract with Barcelona.

=== Betis ===
On 31 January 2018, two days after leaving Barcelona, Kaptoum signed with Real Betis and was initially assigned to the B-team. He made his first team debut on 4 October, replacing Sergio León in a 3–0 home defeat of F91 Dudelange, for the season's UEFA Europa League.

Kaptoum made his La Liga debut on 3 February 2019, playing the full 90 minutes in a 1–0 home win against Atlético Madrid. On 10 January 2020, Kaptoum joined UD Almería on loan for the remainder of the season.

On 5 October 2020, Kaptoum terminated his contract with the Verdiblancos.

=== New England Revolution ===
On 23 December 2020, the New England Revolution of Major League Soccer announced the signing of Kaptoum on a free transfer. He scored his first goal for the club against Chicago Fire on 16 October 2021. Following the 2022 season, New England opted to decline his contract option.

=== Las Palmas ===
On 13 January 2023, Kaptoum returned to Spain and its second division, after signing a short-term deal with UD Las Palmas.

=== AEK Larnaca ===
On 13 July 2023, Kaptoum joined Cypriot First Division club AEK Larnaca FC.

=== Panserraikos ===
On 27 July 2024, Kaptoum moved to Super League Greece side Panserraikos FC. He only made nine appearances for the side before leaving.

=== Gimnàstic ===
On 24 July 2025, Kaptoum returned to Spain and went on a trial at Gimnàstic de Tarragona. On 5 August, he signed a one-year contract with the Primera Federación side, but terminated his link the following 2 February.

=== CP Cacareño ===
On 4 February 2026, Kaptoum joined Spanish club CP Cacereño of the Primera Federación.

== International career ==
On 16 November 2018, he appeared for the first time on the bench of the Cameroon national team, without coming on, during a match against Morocco as part of the 2019 Africa Cup of Nations qualification, a 2–0 defeat.

Subsequently, in 2019, he was selected by coach Clarence Seedorf to take part in the final phase of the 2019 Africa Cup of Nations in Egypt, despite never having made his debut for the national team. Cameroon were eliminated in the round of 16 by Nigeria, with Kaptoum remaining on the bench.

== Career statistics ==
=== Club ===
As of match played 5 February 2026

Appearances and goals by club, season and competition
Club	Season	League			National cup		Continental		Other		Total	
Club	Season	Division	Apps	Goals	Apps	Goals	Apps	Goals	Apps	Goals	Apps	Goals
Barcelona B	2013–14	Segunda División	0	0	—		—		—		0	0
Barcelona B	2014–15	Segunda División	3	1	—		—		—		3	1
Barcelona B	2015–16	Segunda División B	25	3	—		—		—		25	3
Barcelona B	2016–17	Segunda División B	14	2	—		—		2 (Note: Two appearances in Segunda División B play-offs)	0	16	2
Barcelona B	Total		42	6	0	0	0	0	2	0	44	6
Barcelona	2015–16	La Liga	0	0	2	1	1 (Note: Appearance(s) in UEFA Champions League)	0	—		3	1
Barcelona	2016–17	La Liga	0	0	0	0	0	0	—		0	0
Barcelona	Total		0	0	2	1	1	0	0	0	3	1
Betis B	2017–18	Segunda División B	12	0	—		—		—		12	0
Betis B	2018–19	Tercera División	5	0	—		—		—		5	0
Betis B	Total		17	0	0	0	0	0	0	0	17	0
Betis	2018–19	La Liga	10	0	3	0	—		—		13	0
Betis	2019–20	La Liga	5	0	1	1	2 (Note: Appearance(s) in UEFA Europa League)	0	—		8	1
Betis	Total		15	0	4	1	2	0	0	0	21	1
Almería (loan)	2019–20	Segunda División	8	0	0	0	—		—		8	0
New England Revolution	2021	MLS	21	1	0	0	—		—		21	1
New England Revolution	2022	MLS	21	1	1	0	—		—		22	1
New England Revolution	Total		42	2	1	0	0	0	0	0	43	2
Las Palmas	2022–23	La Liga	11	0	0	0	—		—		11	0
Larnaca	2023–24	Cypriot First Division	14	0	0	0	3 (Note: Appearances in UEFA Europa Conference League)	0	—		17	0
Panserraikos	2024–25	Super League Greek	7	0	2	0	—		—		9	0
Gimnàstic	2025–26	Primera Federación	8	1	1	0	—		—		9	1
Cacereño	2025–26	Primera Federación	0	0	0	0	—		—		0	0
Career total			164	9	10	2	6	0	2	0	182	11

== Honours ==
Barcelona

- Copa del Rey: 2015–16
- UEFA Youth League: 2013–14

New England Revolution

- Supporters' Shield: 2021
