= 2018–19 Real Betis season =

Real Betis
2018–19 season
- President: Ángel Haro
- Head coach: Quique Setién
- Stadium: Benito Villamarín
- La Liga: 10th
- Copa del Rey: Semi-finals
- UEFA Europa League: Round of 32
- Top goalscorer: League: Giovani Lo Celso (9); All: Giovani Lo Celso (16)
Home colours	Away colours	Third colours

During the 2018–19 season, Real Betis participated in La Liga, Copa del Rey and UEFA Europa League.

== Players ==
As of 10 January 2019

Note: Flags indicate national team as defined under FIFA eligibility rules; some limited exceptions apply. Players may hold more than one non-FIFA nationality.

No.	Pos.	Nation	Player
1	GK	ESP	Joel Robles
2	DF	ESP	Francis
3	MF	ESP	Javi García (4th captain)
4	DF	MAR	Zouhair Feddal
5	DF	ESP	Marc Bartra
6	MF	ESP	Sergio Canales
7	FW	ESP	Sergio León
8	MF	JPN	Takashi Inui
9	FW	PAR	Antonio Sanabria
10	MF	ALG	Ryad Boudebouz
11	MF	ESP	Cristian Tello

No.	Pos.	Nation	Player
12	DF	BRA	Sidnei
13	GK	ESP	Pau López
14	MF	POR	William Carvalho
16	FW	ESP	Loren
17	MF	ESP	Joaquín (captain)
18	MF	MEX	Andrés Guardado (vice-captain)
19	DF	ESP	Antonio Barragán
20	DF	ESP	Junior Firpo
21	MF	ARG	Giovani Lo Celso (on loan from Paris Saint-Germain)
22	MF	MEX	Diego Lainez
23	DF	ALG	Aïssa Mandi (3rd captain)

=== Reserve team ===
Note: Flags indicate national team as defined under FIFA eligibility rules; some limited exceptions apply. Players may hold more than one non-FIFA nationality.

No.	Pos.	Nation	Player
31	GK	ESP	Daniel Rebollo
33	MF	ESP	Rober

No.	Pos.	Nation	Player
34	MF	CMR	Wilfrid Kaptoum
36	MF	ESP	Iván Navarro

=== Out on loan ===
Note: Flags indicate national team as defined under FIFA eligibility rules; some limited exceptions apply. Players may hold more than one non-FIFA nationality.

No.	Pos.	Nation	Player
—	DF	ESP	Redru (at Elche until 30 June 2019)
—	DF	ROU	Alin Toșca (at PAOK until 30 June 2019)
—	MF	SRB	Darko Brašanac (at Alavés until 30 June 2019)
—	MF	ESP	Víctor Camarasa (at Cardiff City until 30 June 2019)

No.	Pos.	Nation	Player
—	MF	COL	Juanjo Narváez (at Almería until 30 June 2019)
—	FW	ESP	Aitor Ruibal (at Rayo Majadahonda until 30 June 2019)
—	FW	ESP	Álex Alegría (at Rayo Vallecano until 30 June 2019)

== Transfers ==
=== In ===
Date	Player	From	Type	Fee	Ref
30 May 2018	(Argentina) Germán Pezzella	(Italy) Fiorentina	Loan return		
30 June 2018	(Spain) Álex Alegría	(Spain) Levante	Loan return		
30 June 2018	(Serbia) Darko Brašanac	(Spain) Leganés	Loan return		
30 June 2018	(Colombia) Juanjo Narváez	(Spain) Córdoba	Loan return		
30 June 2018	(Romania) Alin Toșca	(Italy) Benevento	Loan return		
1 July 2018	(Spain) Antonio Barragán	(England) Middlesbrough	Transfer	€1,000,000	
1 July 2018	(Japan) Takashi Inui	(Spain) Eibar	Transfer	Free	
1 July 2018	(Spain) Pau López	(Spain) Espanyol	Transfer	Free	
3 July 2018	(Spain) Sergio Canales	(Spain) Real Sociedad	Transfer	Free	
5 July 2018	(Spain) Joel Robles	(England) Everton	Transfer	Free	
13 July 2018	(Portugal) William Carvalho	(Portugal) Sporting CP	Transfer	€20,000,000	
2 August 2018	(Brazil) Sidnei	(Spain) Deportivo La Coruña	Transfer	€4,500,000	
31 August 2018	(Argentina) Giovani Lo Celso	(France) Paris Saint-Germain	Loan		
10 January 2019	(Mexico) Diego Lainez	(Mexico) América	Transfer	$14,000,000	

=== Out ===
Date	Player	To	Type	Fee	Ref
26 May 2018	(Spain) Dani Giménez	(Spain) Deportivo La Coruña	Transfer	Free	
30 May 2018	(Argentina) Germán Pezzella	(Italy) Fiorentina	Transfer	€11,000,000	
22 June 2018	(Denmark) Riza Durmisi	(Italy) Lazio	Transfer	€6,500,000	
30 June 2018	(Spain) Jordi Amat	(Wales) Swansea City	Loan return		
30 June 2018	(Spain) Antonio Barragán	(England) Middlesbrough	Loan return		
30 June 2018	(Costa Rica) Joel Campbell	(England) Arsenal	Loan return		
1 July 2018	(Spain) Rafa Navarro	(Spain) Alavés	Transfer	Free	
5 July 2018	(Spain) Fabián	(Italy) Napoli	Transfer	€30,000,000	
10 July 2018	(Spain) Antonio Adán	(Spain) Atlético Madrid	Transfer	€1,000,000	
13 July 2018	(Spain) Rubén Castro	(Spain) Las Palmas	Transfer	Free	
9 August 2018	(Spain) Víctor Camarasa	(Wales) Cardiff City	Loan		
24 August 2018	(Romania) Alin Toșca	(Greece) PAOK	Loan		
31 August 2018	(Spain) Álex Alegría	(Spain) Rayo Vallecano	Loan		
31 August 2018	(Serbia) Darko Brašanac	(Spain) Alavés	Loan		
31 August 2018	(Colombia) Juanjo Narváez	(Spain) Almería	Loan		

== Pre-season and friendlies ==
23 May 2019 Friendly	D.C. United	2–5	Real Betis	Washington, D.C., United States
02:00 CEST (UTC+02:00)	Yow 47'; Amarikwa 69'	Report	Loren 16'; León 37'; Robles (yellow card) 52'; Joaquín 64'; Bartra 72' (pen.); Rober 76'	Stadium: Audi Field

25 May 2019 Friendly	Chattanooga FC	3-4	Real Betis	Chattanooga, Tennessee
18:00	Costa 12'; Webb 84'; Ferraz 90+2'	Chattanooga FC Highlights; Times Free Press Report	León 45+1'; Jesé 68', 72'; Rodríguez 80'	Stadium: Finley Stadium

== Competitions ==
=== Overall ===
Competition	First match	Last match	Starting round	Final position	Record							
Competition	First match	Last match	Starting round	Final position	Pld	W	D	L	GF	GA	GD	Win %
La Liga	17 August 2018	19 May 2019	Matchday 1	10th	38	14	8	16	44	52	−8	36.84
Copa del Rey	1 November 2018	28 February 2019	Round of 32	Semi-finals	8	3	4	1	12	7	+5	37.50
UEFA Europa League	20 September 2018	21 February 2019	Group stage	Round of 32	8	3	4	1	11	8	+3	37.50
Total					54	20	16	18	67	67	+0	37.04

Last updated: 19 May 2019
Source: Competitions

=== La Liga ===
==== League table ====
Pos	Team	Pld	W	D	L	GF	GA	GD	Pts
8	Athletic Bilbao	38	13	14	11	41	45	−4	53 (Note: Espanyol finished ahead of Athletic Bilbao on head-to-head points: Espanyol 1–0 Athletic Bilbao, Athletic Bilbao 1–1 Espanyol.)
9	Real Sociedad	38	13	11	14	45	46	−1	50 (Note: Real Sociedad finished ahead of Real Betis and Alavés on head-to-head points: Real Sociedad 6, Real Betis 5, Alavés 5. Real Betis finished ahead of Alavés on goal difference: Real Betis –8, Alavés –11.)
10	Real Betis	38	14	8	16	44	52	−8	50
11	Alavés	38	13	11	14	39	50	−11	50
12	Eibar	38	11	14	13	46	50	−4	47

Source: La Liga, Soccerway
Rules for classification: 1) Points; 2) Head-to-head points; 3) Head-to-head goal difference; 4) Goal difference; 5) Goals scored; 6) Fair-play points (Note: Head-to-head record is used only after all the matches between the teams in question have been played)

==== Results summary ====
Overall								Home						Away					
Pld	W	D	L	GF	GA	GD	Pts	W	D	L	GF	GA	GD	W	D	L	GF	GA	GD
38	14	8	16	44	52	−8	50	8	5	6	25	26	−1	6	3	10	19	26	−7

Last updated: 19 May 2019.
Source: Competitive matches

==== Results by round ====
Round	1	2	3	4	5	6	7	8	9	10	11	12	13	14	15	16	17	18	19	20	21	22	23	24	25	26	27	28	29	30	31	32	33	34	35	36	37	38
Ground	H	A	H	A	H	A	H	A	H	A	H	A	A	H	H	A	H	A	H	H	A	H	A	H	A	H	A	H	A	A	H	A	H	A	H	A	H	A
Result	L	D	W	D	D	W	W	L	L	L	D	W	L	W	W	W	D	L	L	W	L	W	L	D	W	L	W	L	D	L	W	L	L	L	D	L	W	W
Position	20	18	13	10	13	8	5	8	11	13	14	12	14	11	7	5	6	6	7	7	8	6	7	8	7	8	7	8	8	10	9	10	9	11	11	13	10	10

Source: Competitive matches
A = Away; H = Home; W = Win; D = Draw; L = Loss

==== Matches ====
Win Draw Loss Fixtures

17 August 2018 1	Real Betis	0–3	Levante	Seville
22:15 CEST (UTC+02:00)		Report	Roger 38'; Morales 54', 90+5', (yellow card) 90+3'; Luna (yellow card) 82'	Stadium: Benito Villamarín; Attendance: 45,337; Referee: Ignacio Iglesias Villanueva

25 August 2018 2	Alavés	0–0	Real Betis	Vitoria-Gasteiz
18:15 CEST (UTC+02:00)	Wakaso (yellow card) 40'; M. García (yellow card) 47'; Aguirregabiria (yellow card) 70'	Report		Stadium: Mendizorrotza; Attendance: 12,490; Referee: Pablo González Fuertes

2 September 2018 3	Real Betis	1–0	Sevilla	Seville
20:45 CEST (UTC+02:00)	Carvalho (yellow card) 30'; Canales (yellow card) 64'; Joaquín 80', (yellow card) 81'	Report	Mercado (yellow card) 42'; Silva (yellow card) 45'; Mesa (yellow card) 45' (yellow-red card) 66'; Kjær (yellow card) 71'; Sarabia (yellow card) 81'	Stadium: Benito Villamarín; Attendance: 52,819; Referee: Jesús Gil Manzano

15 September 2018 4	Valencia	0–0	Real Betis	Valencia
18:30 CEST (UTC+02:00)	Torres (yellow card) 16'; Parejo (yellow card) 31'; Piccini (yellow card) 62'; Gabriel (yellow card) 74'; Diakhaby (yellow card) 76'; Batshuayi (yellow card) 90+2'	Report	Sanabria (yellow card) 36'; Guardado (yellow card) 77'; López (yellow card) 81'	Stadium: Mestalla; Attendance: 40,050; Referee: Alejandro Hernández Hernández

23 September 2018 5	Real Betis	2–2	Athletic Bilbao	Seville
20:00 CEST (UTC+02:00)	Bartra 51'; Canales (yellow card) 53', (goal) 68'; Sidnei (yellow card) 70'	Report	Williams 7'; García 18'; Susaeta (yellow card) 38' (yellow-red card) 45'; Yeray (yellow card) 40'; Beñat (yellow card) 45'; Berchiche (yellow card) 50'; I. Martínez (yellow card) 87'; Simón (yellow card) 90+3'	Stadium: Benito Villamarín; Attendance: 50,426; Referee: Xavier Estrada Fernández

27 September 2018 6	Girona	0–1	Real Betis	Girona
22:00 CEST (UTC+02:00)	Alcalá (yellow card) 73'	Report	Boudebouz (yellow card) 37'; Loren 64'; Junior (yellow card) 70'; López (yellow card) 90'	Stadium: Montilivi; Attendance: 11,358; Referee: José Luis González González

30 September 2018 7	Real Betis	1–0	Leganés	Seville
20:45 CEST (UTC+02:00)	Loren 89'	Report	En-Nesyri (yellow card) 3'; Bustinza (yellow card) 38'; Cuéllar (yellow card) 87'; Pérez (yellow card) 90+4'	Stadium: Benito Villamarín; Attendance: 48,115; Referee: José María Sánchez Martínez

7 October 2018 8	Atlético Madrid	1–0	Real Betis	Madrid
16:15 CEST (UTC+02:00)	Juanfran (yellow card) 47'; Godín (yellow card) 58'; Correa 74'; Filipe Luís (yellow card) 77'; Saúl (yellow card) 78'; Hernandez (yellow card) 88'	Report	Firpo (yellow card) 41'; Bartra (yellow card) 85'; Canales (yellow card) 90+3'	Stadium: Wanda Metropolitano; Attendance: 63,786; Referee: Alberto Undiano Mallenco

21 October 2018 9	Real Betis	0–1	Valladolid	Seville
20:45 CEST (UTC+02:00)		Report	Antoñito (yellow card) 26', (goal) 35'; Kiko (yellow card) 40'; Nacho (yellow card) 59'; Masip (yellow card) 85'	Stadium: Benito Villamarín; Attendance: 42,581; Referee: Javier Alberola Rojas

28 October 2018 10	Getafe	2–0	Real Betis	Getafe
12:00 CET (UTC+01:00)	Suárez (yellow card) 38'; Molina 60'; Foulquier 62'	Report	Lo Celso (yellow card) 49'; Barragán (yellow card) 90+2'	Stadium: Coliseum Alfonso Pérez; Attendance: 12,086; Referee: Santiago Jaime Latre

4 November 2018 11	Real Betis	3–3	Celta Vigo	Seville
20:45 CET (UTC+01:00)	Loren 33'; Firpo 57', (yellow card) 72'; Joaquín (yellow card) 65'; Canales (yellow card) 69', (goal) 87'; Mandi (yellow card) 78'	Report	Juncà (yellow card) 62'; Gómez 63', 84'; Méndez 69'; Yokuşlu (yellow card) 82'	Stadium: Benito Villamarín; Attendance: 42,130; Referee: Xavier Estrada Fernández

11 November 2018 12	Barcelona	3–4	Real Betis	Barcelona
16:15 CET (UTC+01:00)	Rakitić (yellow card) 44' (yellow-red card) 81'; Busquets (yellow card) 59'; Messi 68' (pen.), 90+2'; Vidal (yellow card) 73', (goal) 79'	Report	Junior 20'; Guardado (yellow card) 23'; Joaquín 34'; Mandi (yellow card) 69'; Lo Celso 71'; Canales 83'	Stadium: Camp Nou; Attendance: 83,174; Referee: Antonio Mateu Lahoz

25 November 2018 13	Villarreal	2–1	Real Betis	Villarreal
20:45 CET (UTC+01:00)	Gerard 52'; Chukwueze 54'; Morlanes (yellow card) 72'; Ruiz (yellow card) 89'	Report	Canales (yellow card) 89'; Lo Celso 90'	Stadium: Estadio de la Cerámica; Attendance: 16,028; Referee: Eduardo Prieto Iglesias

2 December 2018 14	Real Betis	1–0	Real Sociedad	Seville
12:00 CET (UTC+01:00)	Junior 33', (yellow card) 59'; Lo Celso (yellow card) 46'; Mandi (yellow card) 76'; Carvalho (yellow card) 79'	Report	Hernandez (yellow card) 62'; Willian José (yellow card) 80'	Stadium: Benito Villamarín; Attendance: 46,562; Referee: Guillermo Cuadra Fernández

9 December 2018 15	Real Betis	2–0	Rayo Vallecano	Seville
20:45 CET (UTC+01:00)	Carvalho (yellow card) 31'; Barragán (yellow card) 58'; Lo Celso 59' (pen.); Sidnei 76'	Report	Comesaña (yellow card) 33'; Embarba (yellow card) 33'; Medrán (yellow card) 61'; Amat (yellow card) 90+3'	Stadium: Benito Villamarín; Attendance: 40,218; Referee: Juan Martínez Munuera

16 December 2018 16	Espanyol	1–3	Real Betis	Barcelona
16:15 CET (UTC+01:00)	García 24'; Iglesias (yellow card) 45'; Da. López (yellow card) 56'; Sánchez (yellow card) 84'	Report	Joaquín (yellow card) 18'; Carvalho (yellow card) 23'; Lo Celso 43'; Mandi (yellow card) 53'; Sidnei (yellow card) 65'; Tello 85'; Duarte 90+1' (o.g.)	Stadium: RCDE Stadium; Attendance: 20,275; Referee: José María Sánchez Martínez

22 December 2018 17	Real Betis	1–1	Eibar	Seville
13:00 CET (UTC+01:00)	Sanabria 21'; Lo Celso (yellow card) 57'; Feddal (yellow card) 71'	Report	Escalante (yellow card) 33'; Ramis (yellow card) 42'; Orellana 72' (pen.); Jordán (yellow card) 87'; Oliveira (yellow card) 88'	Stadium: Benito Villamarín; Attendance: 49,426; Referee: Carlos del Cerro Grande

5 January 2019 18	Huesca	2–1	Real Betis	Huesca
20:45 CET (UTC+01:00)	Hernández (yellow card) 41'; Etxeita (yellow card) 45'; Ferreiro 73'; Rivera 79'; Gómez (yellow card) 85'	Report	Feddal (yellow card) 8'; Sanabria 55' (pen.); Francis (yellow card) 78'	Stadium: El Alcoraz; Attendance: 6,135; Referee: Ricardo de Burgos Bengoetxea

13 January 2019 19	Real Betis	1–2	Real Madrid	Seville
20:45 CET (UTC+01:00)	Guardado (yellow card) 4'; Canales 67'; Carvalho (yellow card) 86'	Report	Modrić 13', (yellow card) 35'; Ramos (yellow card) 42'; Valverde (yellow card) 62'; Ceballos 88'	Stadium: Benito Villamarín; Attendance: 54,187; Referee: Alejandro Hernández Hernández

20 January 2019 20	Real Betis	3–2	Girona	Seville
12:00 CET (UTC+01:00)	Tello 12'; Sanabria (yellow card) 45'; Loren 54', (yellow card) 66'; Canales 90+4' (pen.)	Report	Porro (yellow card) 11'; A. García 36'; Fernández (yellow card) 39'; Doumbia 44'; Alcalá (yellow card) 55'; Ramalho (yellow card) 83'	Stadium: Benito Villamarín; Attendance: 47,218; Referee: Adrián Cordero Vega

27 January 2019 21	Athletic Bilbao	1–0	Real Betis	Bilbao
18:30 CET (UTC+01:00)	Muniain 21'; Berchiche (yellow card) 26'; San José (yellow card) 31'; Yeray (yellow card) 82'; De Marcos (red card) 84'; Capa (yellow card) 87'	Report	Sidnei (yellow card) 24'; Loren (yellow card) 50'	Stadium: San Mamés; Attendance: 40,282; Referee: Xavier Estrada Fernández

3 February 2019 22	Real Betis	1–0	Atlético Madrid	Seville
16:15 CET (UTC+01:00)	Canales 65' (pen.); Mandi (yellow card) 82'; Junior (yellow card) 83'; León (yellow card) 85'; López (yellow card) 87'	Report	Arias (yellow card) 40'; Correa (yellow card) 41'; Hernandez (yellow card) 51'	Stadium: Benito Villamarín; Attendance: 50,864; Referee: David Medié Jiménez

10 February 2019 23	Leganés	3–0	Real Betis	Leganés
12:00 CET (UTC+01:00)	En-Nesyri 22', 36', 66'; Vesga (yellow card) 26'; Omeruo (yellow card) 53'; Recio (yellow card) 76'; Braithwaite (yellow card) 90+2'	Report	Barragán (yellow card) 28'; García (red card) 80'; Lainez (yellow card) 89'	Stadium: Municipal de Butarque; Attendance: 11,381; Referee: Javier Alberola Rojas

17 February 2019 24	Real Betis	1–1	Alavés	Seville
20:45 CET (UTC+01:00)	Guardado (yellow card) 12'; Lo Celso 15'; Canales (yellow card) 44'; Lainez (yellow card) 73'; Mandi (yellow card) 83'	Report	Duarte (yellow card) 9'; Maripán 28'	Stadium: Benito Villamarín; Attendance: 43,455; Referee: Antonio Mateu Lahoz

24 February 2019 25	Valladolid	0–2	Real Betis	Valladolid
18:30 CET (UTC+01:00)	Nacho (yellow card) 62'	Report	Canales (yellow card) 20'; Mandi 45+3'; Feddal (yellow card) 83'; Joaquín 87'	Stadium: José Zorrilla; Attendance: 20,125; Referee: Pablo González Fuertes

3 March 2019 26	Real Betis	1–2	Getafe	Seville
16:15 CET (UTC+01:00)	Joaquín 75', (yellow card) 86'; Mandi (yellow card) 90+3'	Report	Arambarri (yellow card) 12'; Cabrera 20'; Mata 44', (yellow card) 51'	Stadium: Benito Villamarín; Attendance: 46,657; Referee: Juan Martínez Munuera

10 March 2019 27	Celta Vigo	0–1	Real Betis	Vigo
12:00 CET (UTC+01:00)	Yokuşlu (yellow card) 64'; Gómez (yellow card) 76'; Mallo (yellow card) 90+5'	Report	Jesé 80'	Stadium: Abanca-Balaídos; Attendance: 18,005; Referee: Xavier Estrada Fernández

17 March 2019 28	Real Betis	1–4	Barcelona	Seville
20:45 CET (UTC+01:00)	Guardado (yellow card) 16'; Loren 82'	Report	Messi 18', 45', 85'; Lenglet (yellow card) 52'; Suárez 63'; Semedo (yellow card) 67'	Stadium: Benito Villamarín; Attendance: 54,172; Referee: Ricardo de Burgos Bengoetxea

31 March 2019 29	Rayo Vallecano	1–1	Real Betis	Madrid
14:00 CEST (UTC+02:00)	Suárez (yellow card) 30'; De Tomás 34'; Tito (yellow card) 52'; Medrán (yellow card) 61'; Bebé (yellow card) 70'; Amat (yellow card) 90'; Di Santo (red card) 90+5'	Report	Emerson (yellow card) 50'; Carvalho (yellow card) 57'; Tello 81'; Loren (yellow card) 87'	Stadium: Vallecas; Attendance: 12,105; Referee: Antonio Mateu Lahoz

4 April 2019 30	Real Sociedad	2–1	Real Betis	San Sebastián
21:30 CEST (UTC+02:00)	Juanmi 17'; Llorente (yellow card) 24'; Zaldúa (yellow card) 52'; Oyarzabal 83'	Report	Guardado (yellow card) 18'; Lo Celso (yellow card) 19'; Barragán (yellow card) 43'; Canales 56'	Stadium: Anoeta; Attendance: 16,417; Referee: David Medié Jiménez

7 April 2019 31	Real Betis	2–1	Villarreal	Seville
20:45 CEST (UTC+02:00)	Lo Celso 11', 63'; Jesé (yellow card) 45'; Feddal (yellow card) 79'; Carvalho (yellow card) 90+5'; Tello (yellow card) 90+6'	Report	Funes Mori 13'; Chukwueze (yellow card) 20'; Ruiz (yellow card) 35'; Cáseres (yellow card) 52'; Mario (yellow card) 90+3'	Stadium: Benito Villamarín; Attendance: 28,475; Referee: Xavier Estrada Fernández

13 April 2019 32	Sevilla	3–2	Real Betis	Seville
20:45 CEST (UTC+02:00)	Munir 26'; Sarabia 59'; Vázquez 63'; Escudero (yellow card) 65'; Banega (yellow card) 70'; Navas (yellow card) 73'; Carriço (yellow card) 81'; Mercado (yellow card) 86'; Rog (yellow card) 90+4'	Report	Jesé (yellow card) 39'; Lo Celso 55'; Tello 82', (yellow card) 90+2'; Mandi (yellow card) 83'	Stadium: Ramón Sánchez Pizjuán; Attendance: 42,885; Referee: Alejandro Hernández Hernández

21 April 2019 33	Real Betis	1–2	Valencia	Seville
20:45 CEST (UTC+02:00)	Guardado (yellow card) 45'; Junior (yellow card) 55'; Feddal (yellow card) 58'; Lo Celso (yellow card) 73', (goal) 78' (pen.)	Report	Guedes 45', 49'; Rodrigo (yellow card) 62' (yellow-red card) 82'	Stadium: Benito Villamarín; Attendance: 42,508; Referee: José María Sánchez Martínez

24 April 2019 34	Levante	4–0	Real Betis	Valencia
21:30 CEST (UTC+02:00)	Campaña 9'; Vukčević (yellow card) 28'; Loren 32' (o.g.); Morales 56' (pen.); Coke 81'; Róber (yellow card) 90'	Report	Sidnei (yellow card) 26'; Mandi (yellow card) 61'; Kaptoum (yellow card) 80'	Stadium: Ciutat de València; Attendance: 20,394; Referee: Santiago Jaime Latre

29 April 2019 35	Real Betis	1–1	Espanyol	Seville
21:00 CEST (UTC+02:00)	Mandi (yellow card) 58'; Feddal (yellow card) 66', (goal) 90+4'; Junior (yellow card) 78'; Bartra (yellow card) 90+6'	Report	Darder 37'; Melendo (yellow card) 68'	Stadium: Benito Villamarín; Attendance: 30,561; Referee: Carlos del Cerro Grande

5 May 2019 36	Eibar	1–0	Real Betis	Eibar
14:00 CEST (UTC+02:00)	José Ángel 45', (yellow card) 79'; Ramis (yellow card) 67'; Escalante (yellow card) 87'	Report	Bartra (yellow card) 54'; Tello (yellow card) 58'	Stadium: Ipurua; Attendance: 4,725; Referee: Ignacio Iglesias Villanueva

12 May 2019 37	Real Betis	2–1	Huesca	Seville
18:30 CEST (UTC+02:00)	Joaquín 22', 90+8', (yellow card) 90+9'; Guardado (yellow card) 70'; Feddal (yellow card) 90+2'	Report	Juanpi 55' (pen.); Etxeita (yellow card) 61'; Diéguez (yellow card) 64'; Galán (yellow card) 64'; Melero (yellow card) 70'; Pulido (red card) 76'; Luisinho (yellow card) 90+7'	Stadium: Benito Villamarín; Attendance: 28,078; Referee: Adrián Cordero Vega

19 May 2019 38	Real Madrid	0–2	Real Betis	Madrid
12:00 CEST (UTC+02:00)	Llorente (yellow card) 37'; Valverde (yellow card) 49'; Carvajal (yellow card) 58'; Isco (yellow card) 85'	Report	Kaptoum (yellow card) 30'; Loren 61'; Jesé 75'	Stadium: Santiago Bernabéu; Attendance: 56,900; Referee: Alberto Undiano Mallenco

=== Copa del Rey ===
==== Round of 32 ====
1 November 2018 First leg	Racing Santander	0–1	Real Betis	Santander
20:45 CET (UTC+01:00)	Nico (yellow card) 42'; Buñuel (yellow card) 47'; Puras (yellow card) 62'	Report	León 8' (pen.); Feddal (yellow card) 17'; Boudebouz (yellow card) 53'; Kaptoum (yellow card) 74'	Stadium: El Sardinero; Attendance: 17,398; Referee: Eduardo Prieto Iglesias

6 December 2018 Second leg	Real Betis	4–0 (5–0 agg.)	Racing Santander	Seville
20:45 CET (UTC+01:00)	Barragán 32'; Sanabria 59' (pen.); León 69'; Lo Celso 89'	Report	Gil (yellow card) 30'; Buñuel (yellow card) 58'; Cayarga (yellow card) 88'	Stadium: Benito Villamarín; Attendance: 34,732; Referee: Xavier Estrada Fernández

==== Round of 16 ====
10 January 2019 First leg	Real Betis	0–0	Real Sociedad	Seville
20:30 CET (UTC+01:00)	Mandi (yellow card) 42'	Report	Zaldúa (yellow card) 10'; Zubeldia (yellow card) 17'; Llorente (yellow card) 79'	Stadium: Benito Villamarín; Attendance: 26,273; Referee: Santiago Jaime Latre

17 January 2019 Second leg	Real Sociedad	2–2 (2–2 (a) agg.)	Real Betis	San Sebastián
19:30 CET (UTC+01:00)	Le Normand (yellow card) 26'; Januzaj (yellow card) 29'; Zubeldia 40'; Merino 62'; Moreno (yellow card) 74'; Illarramendi (yellow card) 83'	Report	Canales 37'; Lo Celso (yellow card) 43' (yellow-red card) 90+1'; Loren 70', (yellow card) 78'; Barragán (yellow card) 89'	Stadium: Anoeta; Attendance: 21,090; Referee: Eduardo Prieto Iglesias

==== Quarter-finals ====
24 January 2019 First leg	Espanyol	1–1	Real Betis	Barcelona
19:30 CET (UTC+01:00)	Hermoso (yellow card) 6'; Iglesias 27'	Report	Feddal (yellow card) 8'; Sanabria 81'	Stadium: RCDE Stadium; Attendance: 13,381; Referee: Antonio Mateu Lahoz

30 January 2019 Second leg	Real Betis	3–1 (a.e.t.) (4–2 agg.)	Espanyol	Seville
19:30 CET (UTC+01:00)	Lainez (yellow card) 35'; Lo Celso (yellow card) 51', (goal) 76'; Mandi (yellow card) 72', (goal) 99'; Canales (yellow card) 90+1'; León (yellow card) 90+2', (goal) 95'; Francis (yellow card) 115'	Report	Hermoso (yellow card) 13'; Baptistão 33', (yellow card) 90'; Roca (yellow card) 58' (yellow-red card) 90+4'; Rosales (yellow card) 85'; Granero (yellow card) 87'; García (yellow card) 92'	Stadium: Benito Villamarín; Attendance: 40,028; Referee: Ricardo de Burgos Bengoetxea

==== Semi-finals ====
7 February 2019 First leg	Real Betis	2–2	Valencia	Seville
21:00 CET (UTC+01:00)	Junior (yellow card) 15'; Loren 45'; Joaquín 54'	Report	Rodrigo (yellow card) 52'; Soler (yellow card) 65'; Cheryshev 70'; Parejo (yellow card) 73'; Gameiro 90+2'	Stadium: Benito Villamarín; Attendance: 57,123; Referee: Carlos del Cerro Grande

28 February 2019 Second leg	Valencia	1–0 (3–2 agg.)	Real Betis	Valencia
21:00 CET (UTC+01:00)	Gabriel (yellow card) 41'; Rodrigo 56'; Doménech (yellow card) 85'	Report	Joaquín (yellow card) 90+1'	Stadium: Mestalla; Referee: José Luis González González

=== UEFA Europa League ===
==== Group stage ====
Pos	Team	Pld	W	D	L	GF	GA	GD	Pts	Qualification	BET	OLY	MIL	DUD
1	(Spain) Real Betis	6	3	3	0	7	2	+5	12	Advance to knockout phase	—	1–0	1–1	3–0
2	(Greece) Olympiacos	6	3	1	2	11	6	+5	10 (Note: Goal difference in all group matches: Olympiacos +5, Milan +3.)	Advance to knockout phase	0–0	—	3–1	5–1
3	(Italy) Milan	6	3	1	2	12	9	+3	10		1–2	3–1	—	5–2
4	(Luxembourg) F91 Dudelange	6	0	1	5	3	16	−13	1		0–0	0–2	0–1	—

Source: UEFA
Rules for classification: Group stage tiebreakers
Notes:

20 September 2018 1	Olympiacos (Greece)	0–0	(Spain) Real Betis	Piraeus, Greece
21:00 CEST (UTC+02:00)	Bouchalakis (yellow card) 21'; Tsimikas (yellow card) 32' (yellow-red card) 73'	Report	Canales (yellow card) 75'; Inui (yellow card) 84'	Stadium: Karaiskakis Stadium; Attendance: 28,650; Referee: Daniel Stefański (Poland)

4 October 2018 2	Real Betis (Spain)	3–0	(Luxembourg) F91 Dudelange	Seville, Spain
18:55 CEST (UTC+02:00)	Sanabria (yellow card) 19', (goal) 56'; Lo Celso 80'; Tello 88'	Report	Kruska (yellow card) 39'; Jordanov (yellow card) 52'; El Hriti (yellow card) 59'	Stadium: Benito Villamarín; Attendance: 40,133; Referee: Andrew Dallas (Scotland)

25 October 2018 3	Milan (Italy)	1–2	(Spain) Real Betis	Milan, Italy
18:55 CEST (UTC+02:00)	Romagnoli (yellow card) 31'; Higuaín (yellow card) 45+1'; Cutrone 83'; Castillejo (red card) 90+4'	Report	Sanabria 30'; Canales (yellow card) 45+2'; Lo Celso 55', (yellow card) 80'; López (yellow card) 86'	Stadium: San Siro; Attendance: 22,405; Referee: Bas Nijhuis (Netherlands)

8 November 2018 4	Real Betis (Spain)	1–1	(Italy) Milan	Seville, Spain
21:00 CET (UTC+01:00)	Lo Celso 12', (yellow card) 61'; Feddal (yellow card) 45'	Report	Suso 62'; Rodríguez (yellow card) 73'; Musacchio (yellow card) 78'; Bakayoko (yellow card) 88'; Bertolacci (yellow card) 90+4'	Stadium: Benito Villamarín; Attendance: 45,647; Referee: Craig Pawson (England)

29 November 2018 5	Real Betis (Spain)	1–0	(Greece) Olympiacos	Seville, Spain
18:55 CET (UTC+01:00)	Bartra (yellow card) 29'; Canales 39', (yellow card) 87'; Mandi (yellow card) 73'; Sanabria (yellow card) 75'; Lo Celso (yellow card) 87'	Report	Cissé (yellow card) 18'; Fortounis (yellow card) 18'; Nahuel (yellow card) 24'; Bouchalakis (yellow card) 25'; Elabdellaoui (yellow card) 82'	Stadium: Benito Villamarín; Attendance: 37,722; Referee: Sergei Karasev (Russia)

13 December 2018 6	F91 Dudelange (Luxembourg)	0–0	(Spain) Real Betis	Luxembourg City, Luxembourg
21:00 CET (UTC+01:00)	Schnell (yellow card) 44'; Bonnefoi (yellow card) 90+4'	Report		Stadium: Stade Josy Barthel; Attendance: 4,931; Referee: Peter Kralovič (Slovakia)

==== Knockout phase ====
===== Round of 32 =====
14 February 2019 First leg	Rennes (France)	3–3	(Spain) Real Betis	Rennes, France
18:55 CET (UTC+01:00)	Hunou 2'; García 10' (o.g.); André (yellow card) 31'; Da Silva (yellow card) 32'; Ben Arfa 45+3' (pen.); Traoré (yellow card) 63'	Report	Junior (yellow card) 16'; Lo Celso 32', (yellow card) 74'; Sidnei 62'; Lainez 90'	Stadium: Roazhon Park; Attendance: 28,656; Referee: Anastasios Sidiropoulos (Greece)

21 February 2019 Second leg	Real Betis (Spain)	1–3 (4–6 agg.)	(France) Rennes	Seville, Spain
21:00 CET (UTC+01:00)	Sidnei (yellow card) 35'; Lo Celso 41'; Carvalho (yellow card) 75'; Joaquín (yellow card) 79'	Report	Bensebaini 22'; Hunou 30'; Niang (yellow card) 58', (goal) 90+4'; Traoré (yellow card) 82'; Zeffane (yellow card) 90+2'	Stadium: Benito Villamarín; Attendance: 44,316; Referee: Viktor Kassai (Hungary)

== Statistics ==
=== Appearances and goals ===
Last updated on 19 May 2019.

No.	Pos	Nat	Player	Total		La Liga		Copa del Rey		UEFA Europa League	
No.	Pos	Nat	Player	Apps	Goals	Apps	Goals	Apps	Goals	Apps	Goals
Goalkeepers
1	GK	(Spain) ESP	Joel Robles	19	0	5	0	8	0	6	0
13	GK	(Spain) ESP	Pau López	35	0	33	0	0	0	2	0
Defenders
2	DF	(Spain) ESP	Francis	28	0	22	0	4+1	0	1	0
4	DF	(Morocco) MAR	Zouhair Feddal	29	1	19+2	1	3+2	0	2+1	0
5	DF	(Spain) ESP	Marc Bartra	45	1	32	1	7	0	5+1	0
12	DF	(Brazil) BRA	Sidnei	34	2	20+4	1	3	0	7	1
19	DF	(Spain) ESP	Antonio Barragán	21	1	12+2	0	5	1	0+2	0
20	DF	(Spain) ESP	Junior Firpo	29	3	22+2	3	1	0	4	0
23	DF	(Algeria) ALG	Aïssa Mandi	48	2	34+1	1	7	1	6	0
24	DF	(Brazil) BRA	Emerson Royal	7	0	4+2	0	0	0	0+1	0
32	DF	(Spain) ESP	Edgar González	1	0	0	0	1	0	0	0
Midfielders
3	MF	(Spain) ESP	Javi García	21	0	6+6	0	2+2	0	4+1	0
6	MF	(Spain) ESP	Sergio Canales	46	9	30+2	7	8	1	5+1	1
11	MF	(Spain) ESP	Cristian Tello	41	4	13+16	3	4+2	0	5+1	1
14	MF	(Portugal) POR	William Carvalho	43	0	26+4	0	6	0	7	0
17	MF	(Spain) ESP	Joaquín	42	7	17+12	6	4+3	1	5+1	0
18	MF	(Mexico) MEX	Andrés Guardado	42	0	27+4	0	5+1	0	4+1	0
21	MF	(Argentina) ARG	Giovani Lo Celso	45	17	27+5	10	5+1	2	6+1	5
22	MF	(Mexico) MEX	Diego Lainez	16	1	3+9	0	1+1	0	0+2	1
33	MF	(Spain) ESP	Rober	1	0	0	0	0+1	0	0	0
34	MF	(Cameroon) CMR	Wilfrid Kaptoum	15	0	9+1	0	2+1	0	1+1	0
Forwards
7	FW	(Spain) ESP	Sergio León	26	3	6+9	0	1+4	3	4+2	0
10	FW	(Spain) ESP	Jesé	18	2	9+5	2	1+1	0	1+1	0
16	FW	(Spain) ESP	Loren	45	8	22+11	6	4+2	2	4+2	0
Players who have made an appearance or had a squad number this season but have left the club either permanently or on loan
8	MF	(Japan) JPN	Takashi Inui	14	0	5+3	0	2	0	2+2	0
9	FW	(Paraguay) PAR	Antonio Sanabria	23	6	8+7	2	3	2	4+1	2
10	MF	(Algeria) ALG	Ryad Boudebouz	12	0	6+3	0	1+1	0	0+1	0
