= Ismael Gutiérrez =

Spanish footballer (born 2000)

Personal information
- Full name: Ismael Gutiérrez Montilla
- Date of birth: 10 October 2000 (age 26)
- Place of birth: Los Palacios, Spain
- Height: 1.76 m (5 ft 9 in)
- Position: Midfielder

Team information
- Current team: Xerez
- Number: 8

Youth career
- 2015–2019: Betis

Senior career*
Years	Team	Apps	(Gls)
2019	Betis B	14	(0)
2019–2020	Betis	3	(0)
2020	→ Alavés (loan)	0	(0)
2020–2022	Atlético Madrid B	13	(0)
2021–2022	→ Málaga (loan)	5	(0)
2022–2023	La Nucía	33	(1)
2023–2024	Mérida	23	(0)
2025	Linares	14	(1)
2025–	Xerez	32	(2)
- * Club domestic league appearances and goals as of 7 May 2026

Ismael Gutiérrez Montilla (born 10 October 2000), sometimes known simply as Ismael, is a Spanish footballer who plays as a central midfielder for Segunda Federación club Xerez.

== Club career ==
Born in Los Palacios y Villafranca, Seville, Andalusia, Ismael represented Real Betis as a youth. He made his senior debut with the reserves on 14 April 2019, starting in a 3–0 Tercera División home win against Córdoba CF B.

On 4 July 2019, Ismael renewed his contract until 2021 and was called up to the pre-season with the main squad. He made his professional – and La Liga – debut on 20 September, coming on as a late substitute for Andrés Guardado in a 0–0 away draw against CA Osasuna.

On 13 January 2020, Ismael extended his contract until 2023 and was immediately loaned to fellow top tier side Deportivo Alavés until June 2021. On 3 October, however, he agreed to a contract with Atlético Madrid and was initially assigned to the B-team in Segunda División B.

On 13 July 2021, Ismael was loaned to Segunda División side Málaga CF for the season. On 24 June of the following year, after featuring rarely, he moved to Primera Federación side CF La Nucía.

== Personal life ==
Ismael's cousin Fabián is also a footballer and a midfielder. He too was groomed at Betis.

== Career statistics ==
=== Club ===
As of match played 16 May 2021

Appearances and goals by club, season and competition
Club	Season	League			National Cup		Other		Total	
Club	Season	Division	Apps	Goals	Apps	Goals	Apps	Goals	Apps	Goals
Betis	2019–20	La Liga	3	0	1	0	—		4	0
Alavés (loan)	2019–20	La Liga	0	0	0	0	—		0	0
Atlético Madrid B	2020–21	Segunda División B	15	0	—		—		15	0
Career total			18	0	1	0	0	0	19	0
