= Antonio Sanabria =

Paraguayan footballer (born 1996)

- Sanabria with Paraguay in 2026

Personal information
- Full name: Arnaldo Antonio Sanabria Ayala
- Date of birth: 4 March 1996 (age 30)
- Place of birth: San Lorenzo, Paraguay
- Height: 1.82 m (6 ft 0 in)
- Position: Forward

Team information
- Current team: Internacional
- Number: 19

Youth career
- 2004–2007: Cerro Porteño
- 2007–2009: La Blanca Subur
- 2009–2013: Barcelona
- 2014: Roma

Senior career*
Years	Team	Apps	(Gls)
2013–2014	Barcelona B	10	(3)
2014	Sassuolo	2	(0)
2014–2016	Roma	2	(0)
2015–2016	→ Sporting Gijón (loan)	30	(11)
2016–2021	Betis	70	(17)
2019–2020	→ Genoa (loan)	39	(9)
2021–2025	Torino	137	(30)
2025–2026	Cremonese	25	(1)
2026–	Internacional	0	(0)

International career^{‡}
2012–2013	Paraguay U17	8	(6)
2013–2015	Paraguay U20	9	(0)
2013–	Paraguay	50	(7)
- * Club domestic league appearances and goals as of 22 August 2026 ‡ National team caps and goals as of 16:25, 30 June 2026 (UTC)

Arnaldo Antonio Sanabria Ayala (born 4 March 1996), also known as Tony Sanabria, is a Paraguayan professional footballer who plays as a forward for Campeonato Brasileiro Série A club Internacional and the Paraguay national team.

== Club career ==
=== Barcelona ===
Born in San Lorenzo, Paraguay, Sanabria started his career in futsal, later moving to football. He joined Cerro Porteño's youth academy in 2004. In 2007, he and his parents moved to Spain, and he joined a local club from Sitges, called La Blanca Subur CF.

Sanabria joined Spanish club Barcelona's youth academy in 2009, aged 13. A year later, he moved to La Masia's facilities. In September 2012, still a youth, he was called up by manager Tito Vilanova to train with first team.

In August 2013, Sanabria was promoted to Barcelona B in Segunda División. On 29 September he made his professional debut, playing the last 22 minutes in a 0–1 home loss against Mallorca.

On 20 November 2013, Sanabria rejected a contract extension from Barça. Three days later he scored his first professional goal, in a 1–2 home loss against Las Palmas. He was linked to Italian club Roma and others which faced fierce competition to sign him in January.

=== Sassuolo ===
On 29 January 2014, Sanabria joined fellow Serie A side Sassuolo, for a €4.5 million fee, plus €7.5 million bonuses "dependent on the player’s performance and his future value". The deal was later clarified and he would join Roma in July, as the Giallorossi already reached the foreign quota.

Sanabria made his Serie A debut on 23 March, replacing Davide Biondini in a 0–1 loss at Udinese.

=== Roma ===
Sanabria officially joined Roma in July 2014 for €4.926 million (including €2.5 million from Roma via Sassuolo to Barcelona). Roma also took the contractual responsibility from Sassuolo, to pay Barcelona up to an additional €7 million for bonuses. As well as being a member of the first team squad, Sanabria also featured for the Roma Primavera squad in the 2014–15 UEFA Youth League, scoring two goals in the 3–2 defeat against Bayern Munich on 5 November 2014.

On 8 February 2015, Sanabria made his first team debut for Roma, replacing Francesco Totti after 62 minutes, in the 2–1 Serie A victory against Cagliari.

==== Loan to Sporting Gijón ====
On 11 August 2015, Sanabria returned to Spain after agreeing to a one-year loan deal with La Liga side Sporting Gijón. He made his league debut on 23 August, starting in a 0–0 home draw against Real Madrid. Sanabria scored his first La Liga goals in on 23 September, netting a brace in a 3–2 away win against Deportivo La Coruña.

Sanabria scored a hat-trick in Sporting's 3–1 home success over Las Palmas on 6 December 2015. He added another on 22 January of the following year, coming in a 5–1 route of Real Sociedad.

=== Betis ===
On 15 July 2016, Sanabria signed a five-year deal with Real Betis for a fee of €7.5 million, with Roma retaining a 50% clause on the following transfer and a re-buy clause.

On 20 September 2017 he scored the winning goal in Real Betis' 1–0 win over Real Madrid. It was Betis' first win at the Bernabeu since October 1998, when Finidi George scored in another 1–0 victory.

==== Loan to Genoa ====
On 26 January 2019, Sanabria signed for Serie A club Genoa on loan until 30 June 2020.

=== Torino ===
On 31 January 2021, Sanabria signed a four-year contract with fellow Serie A club Torino.

On 4 January 2024, Sanabria extended his contract with Torino until 30 June 2026.

=== Cremonese ===
On 21 August 2025, Sanabria joined Cremonese.

=== Internacional ===
On 20 August 2026, Sanabria signed with Internacional in Brazil until the end of 2029.

== International career ==
Sanabria played for both the under-17 and under-20 Paraguay teams.

In 2013, Sanabria was called up to the Paraguay national team for two qualification matches for the 2014 FIFA World Cup, against Bolivia and Argentina to make an official appearance for the national team, in the case that Spain wanted to nationalize him.

He made his full squad debut on 14 August 2013, in a 3–3 draw against Germany. Sanabria was selected as part of Paraguay's Copa America Centenario squad, where he made two appearances. He came on as a substitute in the second group stage match against Colombia, as well as started in the final group stage match against the United States.

On 1 June 2026, he was named by head coach Gustavo Alfaro in Paraguay's 26-man squad for the 2026 FIFA World Cup.

== Career statistics ==
=== Club ===
As of match played 10 May 2026

Appearances and goals by club, season and competition
Club	Season	League			National cup (Note: Includes Copa del Rey, Coppa Italia)		Europe		Total	
Club	Season	Division	Apps	Goals	Apps	Goals	Apps	Goals	Apps	Goals
Barcelona B	2013–14	Segunda División	10	3	—		—		10	3
Sassuolo	2013–14	Serie A	2	0	—		—		2	0
Roma	2014–15	Serie A	2	0	—		—		2	0
Sporting Gijón (loan)	2015–16	La Liga	30	11	1	0	—		31	11
Real Betis	2016–17	La Liga	22	4	2	1	—		24	5
Real Betis	2017–18	La Liga	17	8	0	0	—		17	8
Real Betis	2018–19	La Liga	15	2	3	2	5 (Note: Appearances in UEFA Europa League)	2	23	6
Real Betis	2020–21	La Liga	16	3	4	1	—		20	4
Real Betis	Total		70	17	9	4	5	2	84	23
Genoa (loan)	2018–19	Serie A	15	3	0	0	—		15	3
Genoa (loan)	2019–20	Serie A	24	6	0	0	—		24	6
Genoa (loan)	Total		39	9	0	0	0	0	39	9
Torino	2020–21	Serie A	14	5	0	0	—		14	5
Torino	2021–22	Serie A	29	6	0	0	—		29	6
Torino	2022–23	Serie A	33	12	3	0	—		36	12
Torino	2023–24	Serie A	35	5	2	0	—		37	5
Torino	2024–25	Serie A	26	2	1	0	—		27	2
Torino	Total		137	30	6	0	0	0	143	30
Cremonese	2025–26	Serie A	25	1	0	0	—		25	1
Career total			315	71	16	4	5	2	336	77

=== International ===
As of match played 29 June 2026

Appearances and goals by national team and year
National team	Year	Apps	Goals
Paraguay	2013	3	0
Paraguay	2014	2	0
Paraguay	2016	3	0
Paraguay	2017	2	1
Paraguay	2018	2	0
Paraguay	2019	5	0
Paraguay	2020	4	0
Paraguay	2021	5	1
Paraguay	2022	2	0
Paraguay	2023	4	1
Paraguay	2024	3	3
Paraguay	2025	10	1
Paraguay	2026	5	0
Total		50	7

Scores and results list Paraguay's goal tally first.

List of international goals scored by Antonio Sanabria
No.	Date	Venue	Opponent	Score	Result	Competition
1.	5 October 2017	Estadio Metropolitano Roberto Meléndez, Barranquilla, Colombia	Colombia	2–1	2–1	2018 FIFA World Cup qualification
2.	5 September 2021	Estadio Defensores del Chaco, Asunción, Paraguay	Colombia	1–0	1–1	2022 FIFA World Cup qualification
3.	17 October 2023	Estadio Defensores del Chaco, Asunción, Paraguay	Bolivia	1–0	1–0	2026 FIFA World Cup qualification
4.	15 October 2024	Estadio Defensores del Chaco, Asunción, Paraguay	Venezuela	1–1	2–1	2026 FIFA World Cup qualification
5.	15 October 2024	Estadio Defensores del Chaco, Asunción, Paraguay	Venezuela	2–1	2–1	2026 FIFA World Cup qualification
6.	14 November 2024	Estadio Defensores del Chaco, Asunción, Paraguay	Argentina	1–1	2–1	2026 FIFA World Cup qualification
7.	18 November 2025	Alamodome, San Antonio, United States	Mexico	1–0	1–2	Friendly

== Honours ==
Barcelona U19

- UEFA Youth League: 2013–14
