= Rober (footballer) =

Spanish footballer (born 2001)

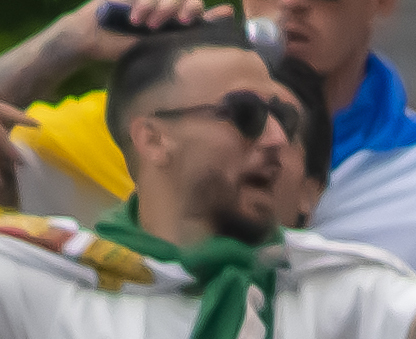
- Rober in 2023

Personal information
- Full name: Roberto González Bayón
- Date of birth: 8 January 2001 (age 25)
- Place of birth: Mérida, Spain
- Height: 1.73 m (5 ft 8 in)
- Position: Winger

Team information
- Current team: Albacete

Youth career
- Mérida CF
- 2013–2017: Betis

Senior career*
Years	Team	Apps	(Gls)
2017–2020	Betis B	82	(31)
2018–2024	Betis	6	(0)
2020–2021	→ Las Palmas (loan)	30	(8)
2022	→ Las Palmas (loan)	18	(2)
2022–2023	→ Alavés (loan)	28	(2)
2023–2024	→ NEC Nijmegen (loan)	30	(6)
2024–2026	NEC Nijmegen	20	(2)
2025	→ Racing Santander (loan)	16	(0)
2026	→ Zaragoza (loan)	15	(2)
2026–	Albacete	0	(0)

International career
2017	Spain U16	3	(1)
2017–2018	Spain U17	6	(1)
2018	Spain U18	4	(0)
2019	Spain U20	2	(2)
- * Club domestic league appearances and goals as of 31 May 2026

Roberto González Bayón (born 8 January 2001), commonly known as Rober, is a Spanish professional footballer who plays as a winger for Albacete Balompié.

== Club career ==
Born in Mérida, Badajoz, Extremadura, Rober joined Real Betis' youth setup in 2013, from Mérida CF. On 8 June 2017, he signed his first professional contract with the latter club, running until 2020.

On 20 August 2017, aged just 16, Rober made his senior debut with the reserves by starting and scoring the opener in a 4–1 Segunda División B home routing of CF Lorca Deportiva. He was a regular starter for the B's during the campaign, which ended in relegation.

On 1 November 2018, Rober made his first team debut at the age of 17, coming on as a late substitute for Takashi Inui in a 1–0 away defeat of Racing de Santander, for the season's Copa del Rey. The following 18 January, he renewed his contract until 2024, with a release clause set on €25 million.

On 3 September 2020, Rober was loaned to Segunda División side UD Las Palmas, for one year. He made his professional debut on 12 September 2020, starting in a 1–0 away loss against CD Leganés.

Rober scored his first professional goal on 3 October 2020, netting the opener in a 2–1 home win against UD Logroñés. The following 1 April, he scored a hat-trick in a 6–1 home routing of CD Lugo, and returned to Betis in July 2021 after scoring eight goals in 30 appearances.

Rober made his La Liga debut on 14 August 2021, replacing fellow youth graduate Rodri in a 1–1 away draw against RCD Mallorca. The following 14 January, he returned to Las Palmas on loan for the remainder of the season.

On 1 September 2022, Rober was loaned to second division side Deportivo Alavés, for one year. On 14 July 2023, Rober moved on a new loan to NEC Nijmegen in the Netherlands, with an option to buy.

On 20 June 2024, NEC exercised the purchase option and signed a three-year contract with Rober. The following 1 February, however, he was loaned to Racing de Santander back in his home country's second division.

On 23 January 2026, Rober again returned to Spain and its division two, being loaned out to Real Zaragoza. On 1 August, he agreed to a two-year deal with Albacete Balompié of the same category.

== Career statistics ==
=== Club ===
As of 8 June 2026

Appearances and goals by club, season and competition
Club	Season	League			National cup		Europe		Other		Total	
Club	Season	Division	Apps	Goals	Apps	Goals	Apps	Goals	Apps	Goals	Apps	Goals
Betis B	2017–18	Segunda División B	26	5	—		—		—		26	5
Betis B	2018–19	Tercera División	35	17	—		—		—		35	17
Betis B	2019–20	Tercera División	21	9	—		—		2 (Note: Appearance(s) in Promotion Playoffs)	1	23	10
Betis B	Total		82	31	0	0	0	0	2	1	84	32
Betis	2018–19	La Liga	0	0	1	0	0	0	—		1	0
Betis	2021–22	La Liga	4	0	0	0	3 (Note: Appearance(s) in UEFA Europa League)	0	—		7	0
Betis	2022–23	La Liga	2	0	0	0	0	0	—		2	0
Betis	Total		6	0	1	0	0	0	0	0	7	0
Las Palmas (loan)	2020–21	La Liga	30	8	1	0	—		—		31	8
Las Palmas (loan)	2021–22	Segunda División	18	2	0	0	—		2 (Note: Appearances in La Liga play-offs)	0	20	2
Alavés (loan)	2022–23	Segunda División	28	2	4	0	—		1	0	32	2
NEC (loan)	2023–24	Eredivisie	29	6	6	0	—		6 (Note: Appearance(s) in Eredivisie European Playoffs)	4	36	10
NEC	2024–25	Eredivisie	17	2	2	0	—		—		19	2
NEC	2025–26	Eredivisie	3	0	3	1	—		—		6	1
NEC	Total		20	2	5	1	—		—		25	3
Racing Santander (loan)	2024–25	Segunda División	16	0	0	0	—		2	0	18	0
Zaragoza (loan)	2025–26	Segunda División	15	2	0	0	—		—		15	2
Career total			244	53	17	1	3	0	13	5	277	59
