= 2022–23 Real Betis season =

Real Betis
2022–23 season
- President: Ángel Haro
- Head coach: Manuel Pellegrini
- Stadium: Benito Villamarín
- La Liga: 6th
- Copa del Rey: Round of 16
- Supercopa de España: Semi-finals
- UEFA Europa League: Round of 16
- Top goalscorer: League: Borja Iglesias (15); All: Borja Iglesias (15)
- Highest home attendance: 54,034 vs Sevilla
- Lowest home attendance: 35,384 vs HJK
- Biggest win: Real Betis 3–0 Elche; Real Betis 3–0 HJK; Ibiza Islas Pitiusas 1–4 Real Betis
- Biggest defeat: Barcelona 4–0 Real Betis
Home colours	Away colours	Third colours

The 2022–23 season was the 115th season in the history of Real Betis and their eighth consecutive season in the top flight. The club participated in La Liga, the Copa del Rey, Supercopa de España, and the UEFA Europa League.

== Players ==
=== First-team squad ===
Note: Flags indicate national team as defined under FIFA eligibility rules; some limited exceptions apply. Players may hold more than one non-FIFA nationality.

No.	Pos.	Nation	Player
1	GK	CHI	Claudio Bravo
2	DF	ESP	Martín Montoya
3	DF	ESP	Edgar González
4	MF	CIV	Paul Akouokou
5	MF	ARG	Guido Rodríguez
6	DF	ESP	Víctor Ruiz
7	FW	ESP	Juanmi
8	FW	FRA	Nabil Fekir (3rd captain)
9	FW	ESP	Borja Iglesias
10	MF	ESP	Sergio Canales (vice-captain)
11	FW	BRA	Luiz Henrique
12	FW	BRA	Willian José
13	GK	POR	Rui Silva

No.	Pos.	Nation	Player
14	MF	POR	William Carvalho
16	DF	ARG	Germán Pezzella
17	FW	ESP	Joaquín (captain)
18	MF	MEX	Andrés Guardado
19	DF	ITA	Luiz Felipe
20	DF	BRA	Abner Vinícius
21	FW	ESP	Ayoze Pérez (on loan from Leicester City)
23	DF	SEN	Youssouf Sabaly
24	FW	ESP	Aitor Ruibal
25	GK	ESP	Dani Martín
28	MF	ESP	Rodri
33	DF	ESP	Juan Miranda

=== Out on loan ===
Note: Flags indicate national team as defined under FIFA eligibility rules; some limited exceptions apply. Players may hold more than one non-FIFA nationality.

No.	Pos.	Nation	Player
—	MF	MEX	Diego Lainez (at Tigres UANL until 31 December 2023)
—	MF	FRA	Yassin Fekir (at Linense until 30 June 2023)
—	FW	ESP	Loren Morón (at Las Palmas until 30 June 2023)

No.	Pos.	Nation	Player
—	FW	ESP	Raúl García (at Mirandés until 30 June 2023)
—	FW	ESP	Rober González (at Alavés until 30 June 2023)

== Transfers ==
=== In ===
Date	Player	From	Type	Fee	Ref.
3 June 2022	(Brazil) Willian José	Real Sociedad	Buyout clause	€8.5m	
1 July 2022	(Brazil) Luiz Henrique	(Brazil) Fluminense	Transfer	€13M	
4 July 2022	(Italy) Luiz Felipe	(Italy) Lazio	Transfer	Undisclosed	
15 January 2023	(Brazil) Abner Vinícius	(Brazil) Athletico Paranaense	Transfer	Undisclosed	
31 January 2023	(Spain) Ayoze Pérez	(England) Leicester City	Loan		

=== Out ===
Date	Player	To	Type	Fee	Ref.
29 July 2022	(Mexico) Diego Lainez	(Portugal) Braga	Loan		
9 August 2022	(Spain) Joel Robles	(England) Leeds United	Transfer	Free	
14 August 2022	(Spain) Marc Bartra	(Turkey) Trabzonspor	Transfer	€1.25m	
26 August 2022	(Spain) Cristian Tello	(United States) Los Angeles FC	Transfer	Free	
1 September 2022	(Spain) Rober	Alavés	Loan		
11 January 2023	(Spain) Álex Moreno	(England) Aston Villa	Transfer	£13.2m	
30 January 2023	(Mexico) Diego Lainez	(Mexico) UANL	Loan		
31 January 2023	(Spain) Loren	Las Palmas	Loan		

== New contracts ==
Position	Player	Date	Until	Ref.
MF	(Spain) Joaquín	6 July 2022	June 2023	

== Pre-season and friendlies ==
Win Draw Loss

16 July 2022 Friendly	SV Grödig	0–0	Real Betis	Grödig, Austria
15:00 CEST (UTC+2)		Report		Stadium: Greisbergers Betten-Arena

23 July 2022 Friendly	PSV Eindhoven	2–1	Real Betis	Eindhoven, Netherlands
18:00 CEST (UTC+2)	Gakpo 7'; Mwene 69'	Report	Juanmi 52'	Stadium: Philips Stadion; Referee: Jeroen Manschot (Netherlands)

27 July 2022 Friendly	Real Betis	1–1	Marseille	Chesterfield, England
19:30 BST (UTC+1)	Miranda (yellow card) 27'; Rodri 90'; Joaquín (yellow card) 90+3'	Report	Touré (yellow card) 18'; Milik 87'; Guendouzi (yellow card) 90+3'	Stadium: Technique Stadium

30 July 2022 Friendly	Brentford	1–0	Real Betis	Brentford, England
15:00 BST (UTC+1)	Mbeumo 29'			Stadium: Brentford Community Stadium; Referee: Chris Kavanagh (England)

3 August 2022 Friendly	Real Betis	2–2	Zaragoza	Málaga, Spain
19:00 CEST (UTC+2)	Juanmi 60'; Loren 79'		Petrović 81'; Simeone 83'	Stadium: Estadio Ciudad de Málaga

6 August 2022 Friendly	Real Betis	3–1	Fiorentina	Seville, Spain
21:00 CEST (UTC+2)	Juanmi 29'; Iglesias 34'; Rodríguez (yellow card) 43'; Bartra (yellow card) 60'; Miranda 74'; Guardado (yellow card) 79'; Pezzella (yellow card) 81'		Jović 61'; Venuti (yellow card) 80'	Stadium: Benito Villamarín; Attendance: 20,000; Referee: Jorge Figueroa Vázquez

13 November 2022 Friendly	River Plate	4–0	Real Betis	Mendoza, Argentina
17:00 ART (UTC−3)	Zuculini 8', 16'; Borja 55'; Beltrán 70'			Stadium: Estadio Malvinas Argentinas; Attendance: 40,000; Referee: Patricio Loustau (Argentine)

16 November 2022 Friendly	Colo-Colo	5–0	Real Betis	Concepción, Chile
20:00 CLT (UTC−3)	Bouzat 12'; Costa (penalty missed) 7', (yellow card) 69', (goal) 71'; Lucero (yellow card) 28', (goal) 9', 79'; Gutiérrez (yellow card) 49'; Zavala 85'; Fuentes (yellow card) 87'; Falcón (yellow card) 87'		Ruiz (yellow card) 29'; Iglesias (yellow card) 69'; Akouokou (yellow card) 87'	Stadium: Estadio Ester Roa; Attendance: 30,000; Referee: Nicolás Gamboa (Chile)

19 November 2022 Friendly	Colo-Colo	1–0	Real Betis	Viña del Mar, Chile
16:30 CLT (UTC−3)	Gil (yellow card) 54', (goal) 77'; Gutiérrez (yellow card) 71'; Bolados (red card) 83'; Falcón (yellow card) 84'		Iglesias (yellow card) 51'; Luiz Henrique (yellow card) 54'; Loren (yellow card) 70'; Miranda (red card) 83'; Fekir (yellow card) 85'	Stadium: Estadio Sausalito; Attendance: 20,000; Referee: Piero Maza

10 December 2022 Friendly	Real Betis	1–0	Manchester United	Seville, Spain
18:00 CET (UTC+1)	Fekir 49'			Stadium: Benito Villamarín; Attendance: 11,927; Referee: José Luis Munuera Montero

17 December 2022 Friendly	Real Betis	1–1	Inter Milan	Seville, Spain
18:00 CET (UTC+1)	Luiz Henrique (yellow card) 18'; Juanmi (yellow card) 52', (goal) 84'	Report	Škriniar (yellow card) 12'; Mkhitaryan (yellow card) 27'; Çalhanoğlu (yellow card) 41'; Barella (yellow card) 69'; Darmian 85'	Stadium: Benito Villamarín; Attendance: 16,589; Referee: Jorge Figueroa Vázquez (Spain)

23 December 2022 Friendly	Real Betis	0–3	Atalanta	Seville, Spain
17:00 CET (UTC+1)			Muriel 22'; De Roon 27'; Éderson 48'	Stadium: Benito Villamarín; Attendance: 18,542; Referee: Mario Melero López (Spain)

== Competitions ==
=== Overall record ===
Competition	First match	Last match	Starting round	Final position	Record							
Competition	First match	Last match	Starting round	Final position	Pld	W	D	L	GF	GA	GD	Win %
La Liga	15 August 2022	4 June 2023	Matchday 1	6th	38	17	9	12	46	41	+5	44.74
Copa del Rey	5 January 2023	18 January 2023	Round of 32	Round of 16	2	1	1	0	6	3	+3	50.00
Supercopa de España	12 January 2023		Semi-finals	Semi-finals	1	0	1	0	2	2	+0	0.00
UEFA Europa League	8 September 2022	16 March 2023	Group stage	Round of 16	8	5	1	2	13	9	+4	62.50
Total					49	23	12	14	67	55	+12	46.94

Source: Soccerway

=== La Liga ===
==== League table ====
Pos	Team	Pld	W	D	L	GF	GA	GD	Pts	Qualification or relegation
4	Real Sociedad	38	21	8	9	51	35	+16	71	Qualification for the Champions League group stage
5	Villarreal	38	19	7	12	59	40	+19	64	Qualification for the Europa League group stage
6	Real Betis	38	17	9	12	46	41	+5	60	Qualification for the Europa League group stage
7	Osasuna	38	15	8	15	37	42	−5	53	Qualification for the Europa Conference League play-off round (Note: Osasuna were initially disqualified from the 2023–24 UEFA Europa Conference League due to historic match-fixing. However, the club became later eligible to participate after an evidence of innocence had been provided.)
8	Athletic Bilbao	38	14	9	15	47	43	+4	51	

Source: LaLiga Santander
Rules for classification: 1) Points; 2) Head-to-head points; 3) Head-to-head goal difference; 4) Goal difference; 5) Goals scored; 6) Fair-play points (Note: Head-to-head record is used only after all the matches between the teams in question have been played)

==== Results summary ====
Overall								Home						Away					
Pld	W	D	L	GF	GA	GD	Pts	W	D	L	GF	GA	GD	W	D	L	GF	GA	GD
38	17	9	12	46	41	+5	60	9	5	5	26	18	+8	8	4	7	20	23	−3

Source: La Liga

==== Results by round ====
Round	1	2	3	4	5	6	7	8	9	10	11	12	13	14	15	16	17	18	19	20	21	22	23	24	25	26	27	28	29	30	31	32	33	34	35	36	37	38
Ground	H	A	H	A	H	H	A	A	H	A	H	A	H	A	H	A	H	A	A	H	A	H	A	H	A	H	A	H	H	A	H	A	A	H	A	H	A	H
Result	W	W	W	L	W	W	L	D	W	D	L	W	D	L	D	W	L	L	W	L	W	W	W	D	D	W	L	L	W	L	D	L	W	W	D	L	W	D
Position	2	3	2	4	3	3	4	5	4	5	5	4	4	6	6	4	6	6	6	7	5	5	5	5	5	5	5	6	5	5	6	6	6	6	6	6	6	6

Source: La Liga
A = Away; H = Home; W = Win; D = Draw; L = Loss

==== Matches ====
The league fixtures were announced on 23 June 2022.

15 August 2022 1	Real Betis	3–0	Elche	Seville
21:30 CEST (UTC+2)	Fekir (yellow card) 4'; Ruibal (yellow card) 22'; Iglesias 28'; Juanmi 39', 60', (yellow card) 78'	Report	Nwankwo (red card) 16'; Milla (yellow card) 16'; Gumbau (yellow card) 30'; Fidel (yellow card) 45+3'; Roger (yellow card) 64'; Josan (yellow card) 81'; Mojica (yellow card) 89'	Stadium: Benito Villamarín; Attendance: 50,622; Referee: Guillermo Cuadra Fernández

20 August 2022 2	Mallorca	1–2	Real Betis	Palma
19:30 CEST (UTC+2)	Grenier (yellow card) 45+3'; Muriqi 56'; Rodríguez (yellow card) 66'; Valjent (yellow card) 70'; Raíllo (yellow card) 70'; Battaglia (yellow card) 73'; Maffeo (yellow card) 84'; Costa (yellow card) 90+10'	Report	Carvalho (yellow card) 1'; Iglesias 9' (pen.), 73' (pen.); Juanmi (yellow card) 36'; Fekir (yellow card) 65'; Pezzella (yellow card) 70'; Rober (yellow card) 82'; Rodríguez (yellow card) 84'; Silva (yellow card) 86'; Loren (yellow card) 90+1'	Stadium: Visit Mallorca Stadium; Attendance: 15,579; Referee: Pablo González Fuertes

26 August 2022 3	Real Betis	1–0	Osasuna	Seville
22:00 CEST (UTC+2)	Iglesias 34'; Pezzella (red card) 73'	Report	Oroz (yellow card) 14'; U. García (yellow card) 68'; D. García (yellow card) 83'	Stadium: Benito Villamarín; Attendance: 52,580; Referee: Juan Martínez Munuera

3 September 2022 4	Real Madrid	2–1	Real Betis	Madrid
16:15 CEST (UTC+2)	Vinícius 9'; Rodrygo 65'	Report	Canales 17'; González (yellow card) 25'	Stadium: Santiago Bernabéu; Attendance: 58,579; Referee: José María Sánchez Martínez

11 September 2022 5	Real Betis	1–0	Villarreal	Seville
21:00 CEST (UTC+2)	Rodri 61'; Guardado (yellow card) 89'	Report	Pino (yellow card) 40'	Stadium: Benito Villamarín; Attendance: 53,276; Referee: Ricardo de Burgos Bengoetxea

18 September 2022 6	Real Betis	2–1	Girona	Seville
18:30 CEST (UTC+2)	Iglesias 15', 71'	Report	Arnau 7'; Espinosa (yellow card) 14'; Gutiérrez (yellow card) 82'; Romeu (yellow card) 87'	Stadium: Benito Villamarín; Attendance: 52,229; Referee: Miguel Ángel Ortiz Arias

2 October 2022 7	Celta Vigo	1–0	Real Betis	Vigo
16:15 CEST (UTC+2)	Veiga 9', (yellow card) 30'; Larsen (yellow card) 32'; Galán (yellow card) 35'; Mingueza (yellow card) 90'	Report	Luiz Felipe (red card) 20'; Pezzella (yellow card) 32'; Canales (yellow card) 65'; Fekir (yellow card) 84'	Stadium: Balaídos; Attendance: 14,344; Referee: César Soto Grado

9 October 2022 8	Valladolid	0–0	Real Betis	Valladolid
14:00 CEST (UTC+2)	Escudero (yellow card) 73'	Report	Pezzella (red card) 35'; Carvalho (yellow card) 90+2'	Stadium: José Zorrilla; Attendance: 22,561; Referee: Carlos del Cerro Grande

16 October 2022 9	Real Betis	3–1	Almería	Seville
21:00 CEST (UTC+2)	Carvalho 23', 71'; Canales (yellow card) 63'; Iglesias 66'	Report	Melero (yellow card) 6'; Touré 52'	Stadium: Benito Villamarín; Attendance: 46,112; Referee: Alejandro Muñiz Ruiz

19 October 2022 10	Cádiz	0–0	Real Betis	Cádiz
19:00 CEST (UTC+2)	Alcaraz (yellow card) 67'	Report	Canales (yellow card) 90+8' (yellow-red card) 90+8'	Stadium: Nuevo Mirandilla; Attendance: 18,505; Referee: Antonio Mateu Lahoz

23 October 2022 11	Real Betis	1–2	Atlético Madrid	Seville
16:15 CEST (UTC+2)	Rodríguez (yellow card) 58'; Fekir 84'; Silva (yellow card) 89'	Report	Molina (yellow card) 38'; Griezmann 54', 71'; Morata (yellow card) 57'; Kondogbia (yellow card) 69'	Stadium: Benito Villamarín; Attendance: 50,179; Referee: Jesús Gil Manzano

30 October 2022 12	Real Sociedad	0–2	Real Betis	San Sebastián
21:00 CET (UTC+1)	Marín (yellow card) 35'; Le Normand (yellow card) 58'; Pacheco (yellow card) 76'; Merino (yellow card) 90+5'	Report	González (yellow card) 51'; Fekir (yellow card) 65'; Akouokou (yellow card) 84'; Cruz 86'; Iglesias 90+3'; Guardado (yellow card) 90+5'	Stadium: Anoeta; Attendance: 32,435; Referee: Javier Iglesias Villanueva

6 November 2022 13	Real Betis	1–1	Sevilla	Seville
21:00 CET (UTC+1)	Navas 43' (o.g.); Carvalho (yellow card) 45+3'; Fekir (red card) 45+3'; Iglesias (red card) 49'; Luiz Henrique (yellow card) 83'; Moreno (yellow card) 88'; Bravo (yellow card) 90'	Report	Montiel (red card) 38'; Acuña (yellow card) 38'; Lamela (yellow card) 66'; Gómez (yellow card) 70'; Gudelj (yellow card) 75', (goal) 81'; Telles (yellow card) 83'	Stadium: Benito Villamarín; Attendance: 54,034; Referee: José María Sánchez Martínez

10 November 2022 14	Valencia	3–0	Real Betis	Valencia
20:00 CET (UTC+1)	Castillejo (yellow card) 33'; Almeida 63'; Guillamón 81' (pen.); Kluivert 90+3'	Report	González (yellow card) 52' (yellow-red card) 61'; Akouokou (yellow card) 67'	Stadium: Mestalla; Attendance: 39,876; Referee: Miguel Ángel Ortiz Arias

29 December 2022 15	Real Betis	0–0	Athletic Bilbao	Seville
19:15 CET (UTC+1)	Joaquín (yellow card) 86'; Luiz Felipe (red card) 90+6'	Report	Vesga (yellow card) 54'; Zarraga (yellow card) 82'; Berchiche (yellow card) 86'; Vivian (yellow card) 90+3'	Stadium: Benito Villamarín; Attendance: 53,565; Referee: Alejandro Hernández Hernández

8 January 2023 16	Rayo Vallecano	1–2	Real Betis	Madrid
16:15 CET (UTC+1)	Camello 20'; Á. García (yellow card) 51'; Trejo (yellow card) 57'; Valentín (yellow card) 83'	Report	Balliu 7' (o.g.); Luiz Henrique 40', (yellow card) 82'; Carvalho (yellow card) 53'	Stadium: Campo de Fútbol de Vallecas; Attendance: 13,119; Referee: Isidro Díaz de Mera Escuderos

21 January 2023 18	Espanyol	1–0	Real Betis	Cornellà de Llobregat
16:15 CET (UTC+1)	Puado (yellow card) 27'; Braithwaite 43'; Montes (yellow card) 56'; Sánchez (yellow card) 89'	Report	Rodríguez (yellow card) 24'; Ruibal (yellow card) 90+1'	Stadium: RCDE Stadium; Attendance: 20,811; Referee: Pablo González Fuertes

28 January 2023 19	Getafe	0–1	Real Betis	Getafe
21:00 CET (UTC+1)	Aleñá (yellow card) 61'; Villar (yellow card) 72'; Duarte (yellow card) 79'; Milla (yellow card) 90'	Report	Luiz Henrique (yellow card) 65'; Iglesias 86' (pen.); Juanmi (yellow card) 90+2'	Stadium: Coliseum Alfonso Pérez; Attendance: 11,573; Referee: Guillermo Cuadra Fernández

1 February 2023 17	Real Betis	1–2	Barcelona	Seville
21:00 CET (UTC+1)	Ruibal (yellow card) 66'; Guardado (yellow card) 67'; Luiz Felipe (yellow card) 69'; Koundé 85' (o.g.); Carvalho (red card) 90+5'	Report	Raphinha 65'; Lewandowski 80'	Stadium: Benito Villamarín; Attendance: 48,181; Referee: Ricardo de Burgos Bengoetxea
Note: The match date was pushed back due to both teams' involvement in the Supercopa de España.

4 February 2023 20	Real Betis	3–4	Celta Vigo	Seville
21:00 CET (UTC+1)	Juanmi 9'; Canales 23'; Fekir 84' (pen.); Luiz Henrique (yellow card) 88'; Luiz Felipe (red card) 90+5'; Joaquín (yellow card) 90+7'	Report	Larsen 6'; Veiga 42', 56'; Aidoo 69'; De la Torre (yellow card) 73'; Núñez (yellow card) 90+5'; Aspas (yellow card) 90+10'	Stadium: Benito Villamarín; Attendance: 45,849; Referee: Carlos del Cerro Grande

11 February 2023 21	Almería	2–3	Real Betis	Almería
16:15 CET (UTC+1)	Suárez 27'; Eguaras (yellow card) 30'; Babić (yellow card) 38'; Costa 62'	Report	Rodri 6'; Canales 42'; González (yellow card) 49'; Guardado 70'; Rodríguez (yellow card) 89'	Stadium: Power Horse Stadium; Attendance: 14,310; Referee: Javier Alberola Rojas

18 February 2023 22	Real Betis	2–1	Valladolid	Seville
16:15 CET (UTC+1)	Juanmi 2'; Abner (yellow card) 12'; Canales 45+4' (pen.); Rodríguez (yellow card) 77'; González (yellow card) 90'	Report	J. Sánchez (yellow card) 5'; Larin 30'; Monchu (yellow card) 55'; Aguado (yellow card) 55'; Pérez (yellow card) 79'; Hongla (yellow card) 89'	Stadium: Benito Villamarín; Attendance: 51,396; Referee: Antonio Mateu Lahoz

24 February 2023 23	Elche	2–3	Real Betis	Elche
21:00 CET (UTC+1)	Fidel 7'; Boyé 9'; Roco (yellow card) 34' (yellow-red card) 90+4'; Gumbau (yellow card) 45'; Magallán (red card) 57'; Diop (red card) 58'; Palacios (yellow card) 90+3'	Report	Abner (yellow card) 6'; Iglesias 65' (pen.), (penalty missed) 88'; Miranda 68'; Willian José 90+5' (pen.)	Stadium: Martínez Valero; Attendance: 20,643; Referee: Javier Iglesias Villanueva
Note: Diop was sent off for dissent while a substitute.

5 March 2023 24	Real Betis	0–0	Real Madrid	Seville
21:00 CET (UTC+1)	Carvalho (yellow card) 45+1'; Sabaly (yellow card) 51'; Iglesias (yellow card) 51'	Report	Camavinga (yellow card) 25'; Rodrygo (yellow card) 59'; Militão (yellow card) 59'; Vinícius (yellow card) 84'	Stadium: Benito Villamarín; Attendance: 52,212; Referee: César Soto Grado

12 March 2023 25	Villarreal	1–1	Real Betis	Villarreal
18:30 CET (UTC+1)	Gerard (yellow card) 40'; Pino 55'; Baena (yellow card) 63'; Torres (yellow card) 76'	Report	Rodríguez (yellow card) 6'; Iglesias 38'; Luiz Henrique (yellow card) 89'	Stadium: Estadio de la Cerámica; Attendance: 19,174; Referee: Miguel Ángel Ortiz Arias

19 March 2023 26	Real Betis	1–0	Mallorca	Seville
14:00 CET (UTC+1)	Iglesias 48'; Guardado (yellow card) 81'	Report	Costa (yellow card) 31'; Nastasić (yellow card) 54'	Stadium: Benito Villamarín; Attendance: 50,402; Referee: Valentín Pizarro Gomez

2 April 2023 27	Atlético Madrid	1–0	Real Betis	Madrid
21:00 CEST (UTC+2)	Molina (yellow card) 36'; Correa 86'	Report	Pérez (yellow card) 61'; Willian José (yellow card) 90+2'	Stadium: Cívitas Metropolitano; Attendance: 61,623; Referee: Juan Martínez Munuera

9 April 2023 28	Real Betis	0–2	Cádiz	Seville
16:15 CEST (UTC+2)	Canales (red card) 38'; Pérez (yellow card) 44'; Carvalho (yellow card) 51'; Miranda (yellow card) 52'; Ruibal (red card) 60'	Report	San Emeterio (yellow card) 43'; Sobrino (yellow card) 45+2'; Alcaraz 53' (pen.); Ramos 59'; Mari (yellow card) 65'	Stadium: Benito Villamarín; Attendance: 51,555; Referee: Guillermo Cuadra Fernández

15 April 2023 29	Real Betis	3–1	Espanyol	Seville
18:30 CEST (UTC+2)	Luiz Felipe (yellow card) 15'; Montoya (yellow card) 17'; Pérez 27'; Miranda 34'; Carvalho 69'	Report	Vinícius (yellow card) 38'; Montes 48'; Cabrera (yellow card) 64'	Stadium: Benito Villamarín; Attendance: 45,313; Referee: Alejandro Hernández Hernández

22 April 2023 30	Osasuna	3–2	Real Betis	Pamplona
14:00 CEST (UTC+2)	Budimir 6', 11'; Moncayola 41'; Aridane (yellow card) 43'; Kike (yellow card) 90+3'	Report	Miranda 16'; Rodríguez 70'	Stadium: El Sadar; Attendance: 19,723; Referee: Javier Alberola Rojas

25 April 2023 31	Real Betis	0–0	Real Sociedad	Seville
22:00 CEST (UTC+2)	Rodríguez (yellow card) 56'	Report	Zubimendi (yellow card) 38'; Muñoz (yellow card) 58'; Zubeldia (yellow card) 59'	Stadium: Benito Villamarín; Attendance: 42,294; Referee: Juan Martínez Munuera

29 April 2023 32	Barcelona	4–0	Real Betis	Barcelona
21:00 CEST (UTC+2)	Christensen 14'; Lewandowski 36'; Raphinha 39'; Rodríguez 82' (o.g.)	Report	González (yellow card) 24' (yellow-red card) 33'	Stadium: Camp Nou; Attendance: 88,530; Referee: Carlos del Cerro Grande

4 May 2023 33	Athletic Bilbao	0–1	Real Betis	Bilbao
22:00 CEST (UTC+2)	De Marcos (yellow card) 49'; Vivian (red card) 90+3'	Report	Willian José 6'; Pérez (yellow card) 43'; Pezzella (yellow card) 56'; Guardado (yellow card) 82'	Stadium: San Mamés; Attendance: 43,116; Referee: Miguel Ángel Ortiz Arias

15 May 2023 34	Real Betis	3–1	Rayo Vallecano	Seville
21:00 CEST (UTC+2)	Sabaly 5', (yellow card) 45+1'; Pérez 44'; Bravo (yellow card) 72'; Pezzella (yellow card) 90+1'; Iglesias 90+6'	Report	Valentín (yellow card) 7'; Comesaña 52'; Mumin (yellow card) 82'	Stadium: Benito Villamarín; Attendance: 48,143; Referee: Juan Luis Pulido Santana

21 May 2023 35	Sevilla	0–0	Real Betis	Seville
21:00 CEST (UTC+2)	Montiel (yellow card) 33'; Rekik (yellow card) 45+1'	Report	Luiz Henrique (yellow card) 27'; Akouokou (yellow card) 83'; Miranda (red card) 87'	Stadium: Ramón Sánchez Pizjuán; Attendance: 41,392; Referee: Jesús Gil Manzano

24 May 2023 36	Real Betis	0–1	Getafe	Seville
22:00 CEST (UTC+2)	Ruibal (yellow card) 45+2'; Luiz Felipe (yellow card) 60'; Pezzella (red card) 78'	Report	Aleñá (yellow card) 29'; Álvarez (yellow card) 40'; Alderete 68'; Soria (yellow card) 84'; Portu (yellow card) 86'; Suárez (yellow card) 90+5'	Stadium: Benito Villamarín; Attendance: 40,289; Referee: Ricardo de Burgos Bengoetxea

28 May 2023 37	Girona	1–2	Real Betis	Girona
19:00 CEST (UTC+2)	Gutiérrez 36'	Report	Iglesias 47', 77'; Rodríguez (yellow card) 86'	Stadium: Montilivi; Attendance: 12,833; Referee: Isidro Díaz de Mera Escuderos

4 June 2023 38	Real Betis	1–1	Valencia	Seville
21:00 CEST (UTC+2)	Pérez 1'; Cruz (yellow card) 90+6'; Iglesias (yellow card) 90+10'; Guardado (yellow card) 90+12'	Report	López 71'; Musah (red card) 81'	Stadium: Benito Villamarín; Attendance: 54,087; Referee: Javier Alberola Rojas

=== Copa del Rey ===
5 January 2023 Round of 32	Ibiza Islas Pitiusas	1–4	Real Betis	Ibiza
16:00 CET (UTC+1)	Bernal 26'; Antonio (yellow card) 59'; Espínola (yellow card) 85'	Report	Ruiz (yellow card) 43'; Willian José 54'; González 58'; Murua 81' (o.g.); Fekir 90+3'	Stadium: Can Misses; Attendance: 1,170; Referee: Javier Iglesias Villanueva

18 January 2023 Round of 16	Real Betis	2–2 (a.e.t.) (2–4 p)	Osasuna	Seville
21:00 CET (UTC+1)	Carvalho 62'; Sabaly 103'	Report	Oroz (yellow card) 59'; D. García (yellow card) 78', (goal) 90+1'; R. García 106'	Stadium: Benito Villamarín; Attendance: 35,817; Referee: Javier Alberola Rojas
	Penalties
	Iglesias (penalty scored); Loren (penalty scored); Canales (penalty missed); Rodríguez (penalty missed)		(penalty scored) Ávila; (penalty scored) Budimir; (penalty scored) Moncayola; (penalty scored) Barja

=== Supercopa de España ===
12 January 2023 Semi-finals	Real Betis	2–2 (a.e.t.) (2–4 p)	Barcelona	Riyadh, Saudi Arabia
22:00 SAST (UTC+3)	Fekir (yellow card) 48', (goal) 77'; Luiz Henrique (yellow card) 68'; Rodríguez (yellow card) 79'; Miranda (yellow card) 92'; Loren 101'; Guardado (yellow card) 112' (yellow-red card) 118'	Report	Lewandowski 40'; Roberto (yellow card) 60'; Raphinha (yellow card) 73'; Fati 93'	Stadium: King Fahd International Stadium; Attendance: 38,629; Referee: Carlos del Cerro Grande
	Penalties
	Willian José (penalty scored); Loren (penalty scored); Juanmi (penalty missed); Carvalho (penalty missed)		(penalty scored) Lewandowski; (penalty scored) Kessié; (penalty scored) Fati; (penalty scored) Pedri

=== UEFA Europa League ===
==== Group stage ====
The draw for the group stage was held on 26 August 2022.

Pos	Team	Pld	W	D	L	GF	GA	GD	Pts	Qualification	BET	ROM	LUD	HJK
1	(Spain) Real Betis	6	5	1	0	12	4	+8	16	Advance to round of 16	—	1–1	3–2	3–0
2	(Italy) Roma	6	3	1	2	11	7	+4	10	Advance to knockout round play-offs	1–2	—	3–1	3–0
3	(Bulgaria) Ludogorets Razgrad	6	2	1	3	8	9	−1	7	Transfer to Europa Conference League	0–1	2–1	—	2–0
4	(Finland) HJK	6	0	1	5	2	13	−11	1		0–2	1–2	1–1	—

Source: UEFA
Rules for classification: Group stage tiebreakers

8 September 2022 1	HJK (Finland)	0–2	(Spain) Real Betis	Helsinki, Finland
19:45 EEST (UTC+3)	Boujellab (yellow card) 45+2'	Report	Ruiz (yellow card) 25'; Willian José 45+3' (pen.), 64'; Pezzella (yellow card) 48'; Luiz Felipe (yellow card) 48'	Stadium: Bolt Arena; Attendance: 10,164; Referee: Roi Reinshreiber (Israel)

15 September 2022 2	Real Betis (Spain)	3–2	(Bulgaria) Ludogorets Razgrad	Seville
21:00 CEST (UTC+2)	Luiz Henrique 25'; Joaquín 39'; Ruibal (yellow card) 45'; Akouokou (yellow card) 47'; Canales 59'; Guardado (yellow card) 74'; Bravo (yellow card) 90+3'	Report	Show (yellow card) 2'; Despodov (yellow card) 42', (goal) 45+1'; Tekpetey (yellow card) 53'; Nedyalkov (yellow card) 74'; Rick 74'	Stadium: Benito Villamarín; Attendance: 43,113; Referee: Andris Treimanis (Latvia)

6 October 2022 3	Roma (Italy)	1–2	(Spain) Real Betis	Rome, Italy
21:00 CEST (UTC+2)	Dybala 34' (pen.); Mancini (yellow card) 71'; Zaniolo (red card) 90+3'	Report	Luiz Felipe (yellow card) 29'; Bravo (yellow card) 32'; Guardado (yellow card) 33'; Rodríguez 40'; Pezzella (yellow card) 83'; Luiz Henrique 88'	Stadium: Stadio Olimpico; Attendance: 62,294; Referee: Matej Jug (Slovenia)

13 October 2022 4	Real Betis (Spain)	1–1	(Italy) Roma	Seville
18:45 CEST (UTC+2)	Guardado (yellow card) 31'; Joaquín (yellow card) 31'; Canales 34'; Miranda (yellow card) 80'; Rodri (yellow card) 90'	Report	Matić (yellow card) 35'; Mancini (yellow card) 44'; Belotti 53'; Camara (yellow card) 58'	Stadium: Benito Villamarín; Attendance: 52,472; Referee: Anastasios Sidiropoulos (Greece)

27 October 2022 5	Ludogorets Razgrad (Bulgaria)	0–1	(Spain) Real Betis	Razgrad, Bulgaria
19:45 EEST (UTC+3)	Cicinho (yellow card) 38'; Verdon (yellow card) 45'	Report	Akouokou (yellow card) 8'; Fekir 56'	Stadium: Ludogorets Arena; Attendance: 9,487; Referee: Harald Lechner (Austria)

3 November 2022 6	Real Betis (Spain)	3–0	(Finland) HJK	Seville
21:00 CEST (UTC+2)	Ruibal 20', 40', (yellow card) 34'; González (yellow card) 48'; Fekir 90+3'	Report		Stadium: Benito Villamarín; Attendance: 35,384; Referee: Willie Collum (Scotland)

==== Knockout phase ====
===== Round of 16 =====
The draw for the round of 16 was held on 24 February 2023.

9 March 2023 First leg	Manchester United (England)	4–1	(Spain) Real Betis	Manchester, England
20:00 GMT (UTC+0)	Rashford 6'; Antony 52'; Weghorst (yellow card) 56', (goal) 82'; Fernandes 58', (yellow card) 69'	Report	Pérez 32'	Stadium: Old Trafford; Attendance: 72,998; Referee: Daniel Siebert (Germany)

16 March 2023 Second leg	Real Betis (Spain)	0–1 (1–5 agg.)	(England) Manchester United	Seville
18:45 CET (UTC+1)		Report	Pellistri (yellow card) 29'; Rashford 56'	Stadium: Benito Villamarín; Attendance: 54,643; Referee: Srđan Jovanović (Serbia)

== Statistics ==
=== Appearances and goals ===
Last updated 4 June 2023.

No.	Pos	Nat	Player	Total		La Liga		Copa del Rey		Supercopa de España		UEFA Europa League	
No.	Pos	Nat	Player	Apps	Goals	Apps	Goals	Apps	Goals	Apps	Goals	Apps	Goals
Goalkeepers
1	GK	(Chile) CHI	Claudio Bravo	21	0	12	0	2	0	1	0	6	0
13	GK	(Portugal) POR	Rui Silva	28	0	26	0	0	0	0	0	2	0
25	GK	(Spain) ESP	Dani Martín	0	0	0	0	0	0	0	0	0	0
Defenders
2	DF	(Spain) ESP	Martín Montoya	6	0	6	0	0	0	0	0	0	0
3	DF	(Spain) ESP	Edgar González	31	1	18+7	0	2	1	0	0	4	0
6	DF	(Spain) ESP	Víctor Ruiz	14	0	5+5	0	1	0	0	0	3	0
15	DF	(Spain) ESP	Álex Moreno	19	0	15	0	0	0	0	0	0+4	0
16	DF	(Argentina) ARG	Germán Pezzella	39	0	29+2	0	1	0	1	0	5+1	0
19	DF	(Italy) ITA	Luiz Felipe	30	0	22+1	0	1	0	1	0	4+1	0
20	DF	(Brazil) BRA	Abner	16	0	7+6	0	0+1	0	0	0	2	0
23	DF	(Senegal) SEN	Youssouf Sabaly	28	2	19+4	1	1	1	0+1	0	3	0
32	DF	(Spain) ESP	Fran Delgado	1	0	0+1	0	0	0	0	0	0	0
33	DF	(Spain) ESP	Juan Miranda	31	3	16+5	3	2	0	1	0	6+1	0
35	DF	(Spain) ESP	Félix Garreta	2	0	1	0	0+1	0	0	0	0	0
Midfielders
4	MF	(Ivory Coast) CIV	Paul Akouokou	18	0	3+9	0	0+1	0	0	0	5	0
5	MF	(Argentina) ARG	Guido Rodríguez	44	2	33+1	1	1+1	0	1	0	4+3	1
10	MF	(Spain) ESP	Sergio Canales	42	6	28+3	4	2	0	1	0	4+4	2
14	MF	(Portugal) POR	William Carvalho	43	4	31+2	3	1+1	1	0+1	0	4+3	0
18	MF	(Mexico) MEX	Andrés Guardado	34	1	16+10	1	0	0	0+1	0	3+4	0
28	MF	(Spain) ESP	Rodri	39	2	19+11	2	2	0	1	0	3+3	0
29	MF	(Spain) ESP	Juan Cruz	6	1	1+5	1	0	0	0	0	0	0
37	MF	(Spain) ESP	Daniel Pérez	1	0	0	0	0	0	0	0	0+1	0
40	MF	(Spain) ESP	Quique Fernández	1	0	0	0	0	0	0	0	0+1	0
Forwards
7	FW	(Spain) ESP	Juanmi	27	4	9+13	4	1	0	0+1	0	3	0
8	FW	(France) FRA	Nabil Fekir	20	6	12+3	2	0+1	1	1	1	1+2	2
9	FW	(Spain) ESP	Borja Iglesias	43	15	29+6	15	0+1	0	1	0	0+6	0
11	FW	(Brazil) BRA	Luiz Henrique	43	3	21+12	1	1+1	0	1	0	4+3	2
12	FW	(Brazil) BRA	Willian José	35	5	2+22	2	2	1	0+1	0	6+2	2
17	FW	(Spain) ESP	Joaquín	30	1	2+20	0	1	0	0	0	7	1
21	FW	(Spain) ESP	Ayoze Pérez	21	5	17+2	3	0	0	0	1	2	1
24	FW	(Spain) ESP	Aitor Ruibal	37	2	15+11	0	1+1	0	1	0	7+1	2
Players who transferred out during the season
21	FW	(Spain) ESP	Loren Morón	4	0	0+2	0	0+1	0	0+1	0	0	0
22	MF	(Spain) ESP	Víctor Camarasa	0	0	0	0	0	0	0	0	0	0
27	MF	(Spain) ESP	Rober	2	0	0+2	0	0	0	0	0	0	0
