= 2021–22 Real Betis season =

Real Betis
2021–22 season
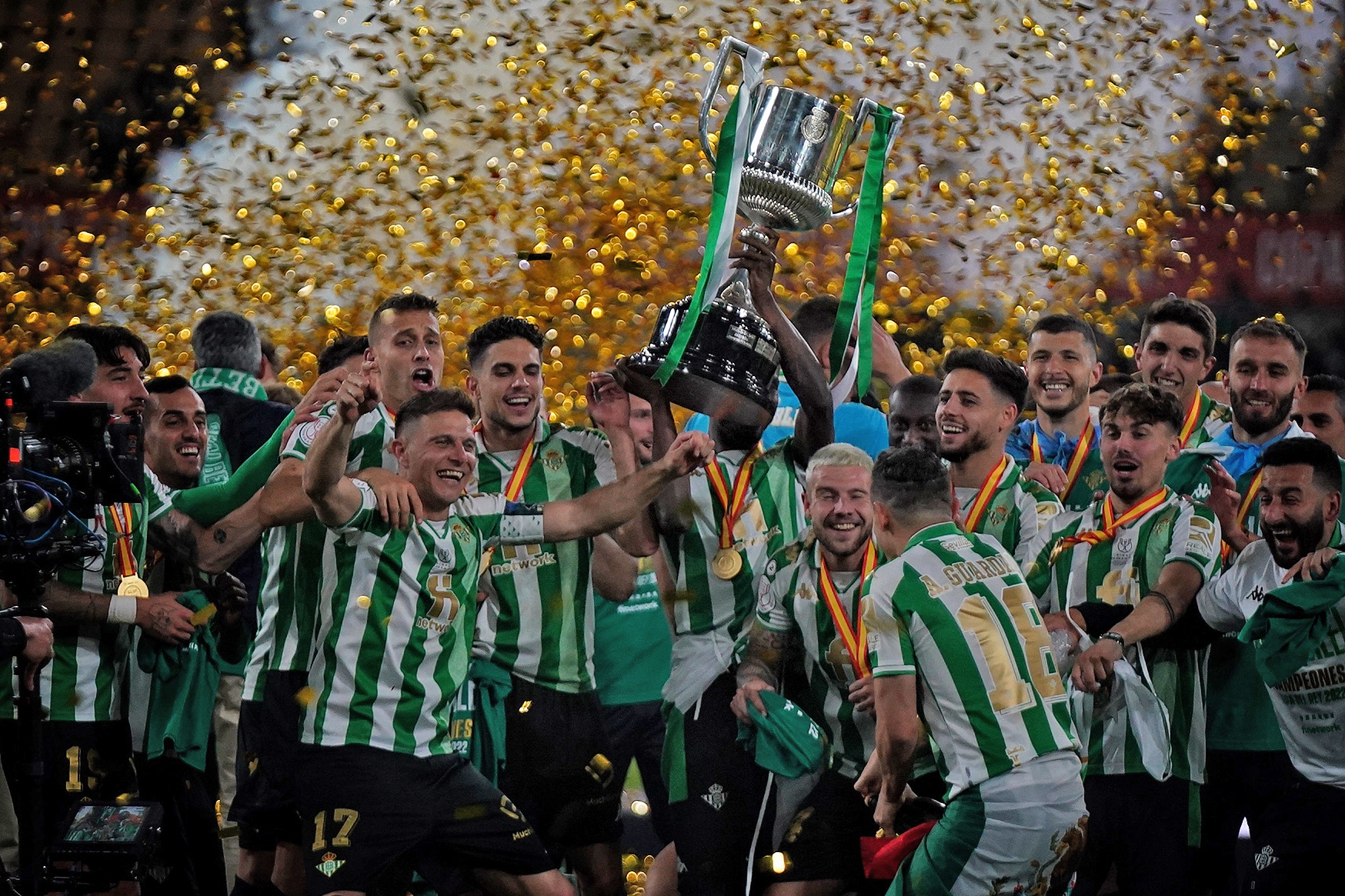
- President: Ángel Haro
- Head coach: Manuel Pellegrini
- Stadium: Benito Villamarín
- La Liga: 5th
- Copa del Rey: Winners
- UEFA Europa League: Round of 16
- Top goalscorer: League: Juanmi (16); All: Juanmi (20)
- Highest home attendance: 52,158 vs Real Sociedad
- Lowest home attendance: 22,590 vs Real Madrid
- Biggest win: Alicante 0–4 Real Betis; Real Betis 4–0 Real Sociedad
- Biggest defeat: Bayer Leverkusen 4–0 Real Betis
Home colours	Away colours	Third colours

The 2021–22 season was the 114th season in the existence of Real Betis and the club's seventh consecutive season in the top flight of Spanish football. In addition to the domestic league, Real Betis participated in this season's editions of the Copa del Rey and the UEFA Europa League.

== Players ==
=== First-team squad ===
As of 14 January 2022.

Note: Flags indicate national team as defined under FIFA eligibility rules; some limited exceptions apply. Players may hold more than one non-FIFA nationality.

No.	Pos.	Nation	Player
1	GK	ESP	Joel Robles
2	DF	ESP	Martín Montoya
3	DF	ESP	Edgar González
4	MF	CIV	Paul Akouokou
5	DF	ESP	Marc Bartra
6	DF	ESP	Victor Ruiz
7	FW	ESP	Juanmi
8	FW	FRA	Nabil Fekir
9	FW	ESP	Borja Iglesias
10	MF	ESP	Sergio Canales (vice-captain)
11	FW	ESP	Cristian Tello
12	FW	BRA	Willian José (on loan from Real Sociedad)
13	GK	POR	Rui Silva
14	MF	POR	William Carvalho

No.	Pos.	Nation	Player
15	DF	ESP	Álex Moreno
16	DF	ARG	Germán Pezzella
17	FW	ESP	Joaquín (captain)
18	MF	MEX	Andrés Guardado
19	DF	ESP	Héctor Bellerín (on loan from Arsenal)
20	FW	MEX	Diego Lainez
21	MF	ARG	Guido Rodríguez
22	MF	ESP	Víctor Camarasa
23	DF	SEN	Youssouf Sabaly
24	FW	ESP	Aitor Ruibal
25	GK	CHI	Claudio Bravo
28	MF	ESP	Rodri
33	DF	ESP	Juan Miranda

=== Reserve team ===
Note: Flags indicate national team as defined under FIFA eligibility rules; some limited exceptions apply. Players may hold more than one non-FIFA nationality.

No.	Pos.	Nation	Player
32	DF	ESP	Fran Delgado
36	DF	ESP	José Calderón

No.	Pos.	Nation	Player
37	DF	ESP	Kike Hermoso

=== Out on loan ===
Note: Flags indicate national team as defined under FIFA eligibility rules; some limited exceptions apply. Players may hold more than one non-FIFA nationality.

No.	Pos.	Nation	Player
—	GK	ESP	Dani Martín (at Málaga until June 30, 2022)
—	FW	ESP	Rober (at Las Palmas until June 30, 2022)

No.	Pos.	Nation	Player
—	FW	ESP	Loren Morón (at Espanyol until June 30, 2022)

== Transfers ==
=== In ===
Date	Player	From	Type	Fee	Ref
30 June 2021	(Spain) Edgar González	Oviedo	Loan return		
30 June 2021	(Spain) Rober	Las Palmas	Loan return		
1 July 2021	(Spain) Juan Miranda	Barcelona	Buyout clause	Free	
1 July 2021	(Senegal) Youssouf Sabaly	(France) Bordeaux	Transfer	Free	
1 July 2021	(Portugal) Rui Silva	Granada	Transfer	Free	
1 July 2021	(Spain) Marc Vidal	Villarreal B	Transfer	Undisclosed	
19 August 2021	(Argentina) Germán Pezzella	(Italy) Fiorentina	Transfer	Undisclosed	
31 August 2021	(Spain) Héctor Bellerín	(England) Arsenal	Loan		

=== Out ===
Date	Player	To	Type	Fee	Ref
1 July 2021	(Brazil) Emerson Royal	Barcelona	Transfer	€14M	
1 July 2021	(Algeria) Aïssa Mandi	Villarreal	Transfer	Free	
13 December 2021	(Brazil) Sidnei	(Brazil) Cruzeiro	Transfer	Free	
13 January 2022	(Spain) Rober	Las Palmas	Loan		

== Pre-season and friendlies ==
Win Draw Loss Fixtures

17 July 2021 Friendly	Winterthur	0–4	Real Betis	Winterthur, Switzerland
15:00 CEST (UTC+2)			Loren 4'; Y. Fekir 37'; Juanmi 48'; Iglesias 69'	Stadium: Stadion Schützenwiese

24 July 2021 Friendly	Real Betis	0–1	Wolverhampton Wanderers	La Línea de la Concepción, Spain
19:00 CEST (UTC+2)		Report	Cutrone 83'	Stadium: Estadio Municipal; Referee: Ruiz Aguilera

28 July 2021 Friendly	Derby County	1–0	Real Betis	Derby, England
20:00 CEST (UTC+2)	Bird 86'	Report		Stadium: Pride Park Stadium

31 July 2021 Friendly	Leeds United	2–3	Real Betis	Loughborough, England
13:30 CEST (UTC+2)	Bamford 6'; Klich 57'	Report	Ruibal 10'; Iglesias 22'; Sabaly 55'	Stadium: Loughborough University Stadium

4 August 2021 Friendly	Almería	2–1	Real Betis	Algeciras, Spain
19:00 CEST (UTC+2)	Sadiq 11', 30'	Report	Rober 17'	Stadium: Estadio Nuevo Mirador

7 August 2021 Unbeatables Cup	Real Betis	5–2	Roma	Seville, Spain
22:00 CEST (UTC+2)	Rodri 4'; Fekir 30'; Moreno 58'; Tello 80'; Rober 83'		Karsdorp (yellow card) 12' (yellow-red card) 78'; Shomurodov 27'; Pellegrini (yellow card) 37' (yellow-red card) 59'; Mkhitaryan (yellow card) 41'; Mancini 51', (yellow card) 58' (yellow-red card) 65'; Zaniolo (yellow card) 54'	Stadium: Benito Villamarín; Referee: Jorge Figueroa Vázquez

== Competitions ==
=== Overall record ===
Competition	First match	Last match	Starting round	Final position	Record							
Competition	First match	Last match	Starting round	Final position	Pld	W	D	L	GF	GA	GD	Win %
La Liga	14 August 2021	20 May 2022	Matchday 1	5th	38	19	8	11	62	40	+22	50.00
Copa del Rey	1 December 2021	23 April 2022	First round	Winners	8	6	2	0	21	6	+15	75.00
UEFA Europa League	16 September 2021	17 March 2022	Group stage	Round of 16	10	4	3	3	17	17	+0	40.00
Total					56	29	13	14	100	63	+37	51.79

Source: Soccerway

=== La Liga ===
==== League table ====
Pos	Team	Pld	W	D	L	GF	GA	GD	Pts	Qualification or relegation
3	Atlético Madrid	38	21	8	9	65	43	+22	71	Qualification for the Champions League group stage
4	Sevilla	38	18	16	4	53	30	+23	70	Qualification for the Champions League group stage
5	Real Betis	38	19	8	11	62	40	+22	65	Qualification for the Europa League group stage (Note: Since the winners of the 2021–22 Copa del Rey, Real Betis, qualified for European competition based on league position, the Europa League berth awarded to the Copa del Rey winners was passed to the sixth-placed team, and the Europa Conference League berth awarded to the sixth-placed team was passed to the seventh-placed team.)
6	Real Sociedad	38	17	11	10	40	37	+3	62	Qualification for the Europa League group stage
7	Villarreal	38	16	11	11	63	37	+26	59	Qualification for the Europa Conference League play-off round

Source: LaLiga Santander
Rules for classification: 1) Points; 2) Head-to-head points; 3) Head-to-head goal difference; 4) Goal difference; 5) Goals scored; 6) Fair-play points (Note: Head-to-head record is used only after all the matches between the teams in question have been played)

==== Results summary ====
Overall								Home						Away					
Pld	W	D	L	GF	GA	GD	Pts	W	D	L	GF	GA	GD	W	D	L	GF	GA	GD
38	19	8	11	62	40	+22	65	10	2	7	33	22	+11	9	6	4	29	18	+11

Source: La Liga

==== Results by round ====
Round	1	2	3	4	5	6	7	8	9	10	11	12	13	14	15	16	17	18	19	20	21	22	23	24	25	26	27	28	29	30	31	32	33	34	35	36	37	38
Ground	A	H	H	A	H	A	H	A	A	H	H	A	H	A	H	A	H	A	H	A	H	A	H	A	H	A	H	H	A	H	A	A	H	A	H	A	H	A
Result	D	D	L	W	D	W	W	L	W	W	W	L	L	W	W	W	W	L	L	D	W	W	L	W	W	L	L	W	D	W	W	D	L	D	L	W	W	D
Position	6	9	14	11	11	8	7	10	8	5	4	5	5	5	5	3	3	3	3	3	3	3	3	3	3	3	5	5	5	5	5	5	5	5	5	5	5	5

Source: La Liga
A = Away; H = Home; W = Win; D = Draw; L = Loss

==== Matches ====
The league fixtures were announced on 30 June 2021.

14 August 2021 1	Mallorca	1–1	Real Betis	Palma
19:30 CEST (UTC+2)	Oliván 25'; Febas (yellow card) 79'	Report	González (yellow card) 45+3'; Reina 59' (o.g.); Juanmi (yellow card) 79'; Akouokou (yellow card) 74'	Stadium: Visit Mallorca Stadium; Attendance: 6,279; Referee: Antonio Mateu Lahoz

20 August 2021 2	Real Betis	1–1	Cádiz	Seville
21:00 CEST (UTC+2)	Silva (yellow card) 8'; Juanmi 22'; Montoya (yellow card) 62'; Miranda (yellow card) 90+3'; Ruibal (yellow card) 90+3'	Report	Negredo 11' (pen.)	Stadium: Benito Villamarín; Attendance: 23,102; Referee: Valentín Pizarro Gómez

28 August 2021 3	Real Betis	0–1	Real Madrid	Seville
22:00 CEST (UTC+2)	Fekir (yellow card) 23'; Pezzella (yellow card) 43'; Canales (yellow card) 44'; Ruibal (yellow card) 45+1'; Montoya (yellow card) 59'	Report	Gutiérrez (yellow card) 43'; Carvajal 61'; Hazard (yellow card) 81'; Casemiro (yellow card) 90+2'	Stadium: Benito Villamarín; Attendance: 22,590; Referee: Alejandro Hernández Hernández

13 September 2021 4	Granada	1–2	Real Betis	Granada
22:00 CEST (UTC+2)	Suárez 66'; Gonalons (yellow card) 90+1'	Report	Iglesias (yellow card) 15'; Fekir (yellow card) 23'; Rodri 45+2'; Canales 89'	Stadium: Nuevo Los Cármenes; Attendance: 10,201; Referee: Guillermo Cuadra Fernández

19 September 2021 5	Real Betis	2–2	Espanyol	Seville
18:30 CEST (UTC+2)	González (yellow card) 9'; Pedrosa 41' (o.g.); Fekir 45+4', (yellow card) 90+7'; Pezzella (red card) 78'; Guardado (yellow card) 88'; Bravo (yellow card) 90+4'	Report	Vidal 16', (yellow card) 75'; Morlanes (yellow card) 37'; Pedrosa (yellow card) 74'; De Tomás (yellow card) 90'; Cabrera 90+7'	Stadium: Benito Villamarín; Attendance: 30,189; Referee: César Soto Grado

23 September 2021 6	Osasuna	1–3	Real Betis	Pamplona
19:30 CEST (UTC+2)	D. García (yellow card) 26'; Kike 39'; Brašanac (yellow card) 80'	Report	Hermoso 21'; Juanmi 80'; Willian José 90+3'	Stadium: El Sadar; Attendance: 13,758; Referee: Juan Martínez Munuera

26 September 2021 7	Real Betis	2–0	Getafe	Seville
21:00 CEST (UTC+2)	Willian José 14', 55'; Carvalho (yellow card) 82'	Report	Timor (yellow card) 35'; Sandro (yellow card) 60'; Silva (yellow card) 90+3'	Stadium: Benito Villamarín; Attendance: 29,825; Referee: Santiago Jaime Latre

3 October 2021 8	Villarreal	2–0	Real Betis	Villarreal
18:30 CEST (UTC+2)	Danjuma 45+1', 69'; Capoue (yellow card) 56'; Torres (yellow card) 62'	Report	Fekir (yellow card) 33'; Juanmi (yellow card) 40'; González (yellow card) 72'; Rodríguez (yellow card) 81'	Stadium: Estadio de la Cerámica; Attendance: 16,719; Referee: José María Sánchez Martínez

18 October 2021 9	Alavés	0–1	Real Betis	Vitoria-Gasteiz
19:00 CEST (UTC+2)	Rioja (yellow card) 60'	Report	González (yellow card) 14'; Iglesias 89'	Stadium: Mendizorrotza; Attendance: 10,227; Referee: Miguel Ángel Ortiz Arias

24 October 2021 10	Real Betis	3–2	Rayo Vallecano	Seville
18:30 CEST (UTC+2)	Moreno 22'; Juanmi 24'; González (yellow card) 32'; Willian José 75' (pen.)	Report	Á. García (yellow card) 32', (goal) 65'; Nteka 45+1'; Trejo (yellow card) 61'	Stadium: Benito Villamarín; Attendance: 45,362; Referee: Ricardo de Burgos Bengoetxea

27 October 2021 11	Real Betis	4–1	Valencia	Seville
20:00 CEST (UTC+2)	Iglesias 14' (pen.), 30'; Ruiz (yellow card) 37'; Rodríguez (yellow card) 54'; Pezzella 61'; Juanmi 68'	Report	Alderete (yellow card) 12'; Gabriel 39'; Guillamón (yellow card) 49'; Guedes (yellow card) 70'; Foulquier (yellow card) 73'; Vallejo (yellow card) 77'	Stadium: Benito Villamarín; Attendance: 43,123; Referee: Isidro Díaz de Mera Escuderos

31 October 2021 12	Atlético Madrid	3–0	Real Betis	Madrid
16:15 CET (UTC+1)	Carrasco 26'; Pezzella 63' (o.g.); Félix 80'	Report		Stadium: Wanda Metropolitano; Attendance: 56,838; Referee: Javier Alberola Rojas

7 November 2021 13	Real Betis	0–2	Sevilla	Seville
21:00 CET (UTC+1)	Rodríguez (yellow card) 10' (yellow-red card) 45'; Tello (yellow card) 90+3'	Report	Diego Carlos (yellow card) 31'; Acuña 55'; Bellerín 81' (o.g.)	Stadium: Benito Villamarín; Attendance: 50,534; Referee: Antonio Mateu Lahoz

21 November 2021 14	Elche	0–3	Real Betis	Elche
18:30 CET (UTC+1)	Boyé (yellow card) 53'	Report	Juanmi 12', (yellow card) 18'; Willian José 24' (pen.); Fekir 27'; Bellerín (red card) 68'; Moreno (yellow card) 90'	Stadium: Estadio Manuel Martínez Valero; Attendance: 16,127; Referee: Valentín Pizarro Gómez

28 November 2021 15	Real Betis	3–1	Levante	Seville
14:00 CET (UTC+1)	Ruiz (yellow card) 40'; Juanmi 54', 63', 78'; Fekir (yellow card) 71'	Report	Mustafi 7'; Vezo (yellow card) 17'; Roger (yellow card) 29'; Malsa (yellow card) 67'	Stadium: Benito Villamarín; Attendance: 45,012; Referee: Miguel Ángel Ortiz Arias

4 December 2021 16	Barcelona	0–1	Real Betis	Barcelona
16:15 CET (UTC+1)	González (yellow card) 42'	Report	Willian José (yellow card) 12'; Rodríguez (yellow card) 73'; Juanmi 79'	Stadium: Camp Nou; Attendance: 66,529; Referee: Pablo González Fuertes

12 December 2021 17	Real Betis	4–0	Real Sociedad	Seville
18:30 CET (UTC+1)	Moreno 14', 79', (yellow card) 56'; Rodríguez (yellow card) 36'; Juanmi 57'; Fekir (yellow card) 62', (goal) 66'	Report	Zubeldia (yellow card) 59'	Stadium: Benito Villamarín; Attendance: 52,158; Referee: José María Sánchez Martínez

19 December 2021 18	Athletic Bilbao	3–2	Real Betis	Bilbao
16:15 CET (UTC+1)	I. Williams 2', 72'; Zarraga (yellow card) 58'; De Marcos 89'	Report	Juanmi 6'; Fekir (yellow card) 49', (goal) 52'; Rodríguez (yellow card) 58'; Miranda (yellow card) 90+1'	Stadium: San Mamés; Attendance: 38,002; Referee: Jesús Gil Manzano

2 January 2022 19	Real Betis	0–2	Celta Vigo	Seville
18:30 CET (UTC+1)	Willian José (yellow card) 53'	Report	Suárez (yellow card) 32'; Aspas 36' (pen.), 45+2'; Cervi (yellow card) 90+1'	Stadium: Benito Villamarín; Attendance: 41,656; Referee: César Soto Grado

9 January 2022 20	Rayo Vallecano	1–1	Real Betis	Madrid
14:00 CET (UTC+1)	Valentín (yellow card) 55'; Balliu 70'	Report	Moreno (red card) 33'; Canales (yellow card) 34', (goal) 45+2'; Guardado (yellow card) 45+6'; Rui Silva (yellow card) 87'	Stadium: Campo de Fútbol de Vallecas; Attendance: 8,395; Referee: Alejandro Muñiz Ruiz

18 January 2022 21	Real Betis	4–0	Alavés	Seville
20:00 CET (UTC+1)	Iglesias 11', 41'; Canales 29'; Juanmi 54'; González (yellow card) 72'; Guardado (yellow card) 81'	Report		Stadium: Benito Villamarín; Attendance: 38,753; Referee: José María Sánchez Martínez

21 January 2022 22	Espanyol	1–4	Real Betis	Cornellà de Llobregat
21:00 CET (UTC+1)	De Tomás 14', (yellow card) 79' (yellow-red card) 82'; Morlanes (yellow card) 60'	Report	Iglesias 31' (pen.), 53', (yellow card) 65'; Pezzella (yellow card) 33'; Rodríguez 36'; Juanmi (yellow card) 43'; Willian José 76'; Carvalho (yellow card) 79'	Stadium: RCDE Stadium; Attendance: 17,637; Referee: Javier Alberola Rojas

6 February 2022 23	Real Betis	0–2	Villarreal	Seville
18:30 CET (UTC+1)	Canales (yellow card) 86'; Iglesias (yellow card) 90+1'	Report	Chukwueze (yellow card) 25'; Moreno (yellow card) 37'; Torres 41'; Capoue (yellow card) 71', (goal) 83'	Stadium: Benito Villamarín; Attendance: 44,870; Referee: Pablo González Fuertes

13 February 2022 24	Levante	2–4	Real Betis	Valencia
16:15 CET (UTC+1)	Gómez 43', 47'; Cáceres (yellow card) 48'; Soldado (red card) 74'	Report	Fekir 14', 49'; Pezzella (yellow card) 22'; González 29'; Carvalho 42'; Bellerín (yellow card) 57'	Stadium: Ciutat de València; Attendance: 16,103; Referee: Santiago Jaime Latre

20 February 2022 25	Real Betis	2–1	Mallorca	Seville
18:30 CET (UTC+1)	Moreno 25'; Ruiz (yellow card) 45'; Juanmi (yellow card) 46'; Willian José 83' (pen.); Bellerín (yellow card) 87'	Report	Muriqi (yellow card) 52', (goal) 75'; Battaglia (yellow card) 82'	Stadium: Benito Villamarín; Attendance: 48,652; Referee: César Soto Grado

27 February 2022 26	Sevilla	2–1	Real Betis	Seville
16:15 CET (UTC+1)	Jordán (yellow card) 13'; Rakitić 24' (pen.); Acuña (yellow card) 28'; Munir 41', (yellow card) 90+3'; Bono (yellow card) 67'; Augustinsson (yellow card) 87'; Fernando (yellow card) 90+4'	Report	Canales (yellow card) 13', (goal) 90+4'; Rodríguez (yellow card) 75'; Ruibal (yellow card) 77'	Stadium: Ramón Sánchez Pizjuán; Attendance: 37,250; Referee: Carlos del Cerro Grande

6 March 2022 27	Real Betis	1–3	Atlético Madrid	Seville
21:00 CET (UTC+1)	Iglesias (yellow card) 23'; Akouokou (yellow card) 40'; Tello 45+5', (yellow card) 71'; Bartra (yellow card) 50'; Ruibal (yellow card) 87'	Report	Félix 2', 61'; Herrera (yellow card) 34'; Carrasco (yellow card) 63'; Lemar 80'; Llorente (yellow card) 87'	Stadium: Benito Villamarín; Attendance: 44,383; Referee: Guillermo Cuadra Fernández

13 March 2022 28	Real Betis	1–0	Athletic Bilbao	Seville
16:15 CET (UTC+1)	Iglesias 20'; Pezzella (yellow card) 25'; Miranda (yellow card) 28'; Ruibal (yellow card) 76'; Fekir (red card) 80'; Canales (yellow card) 80'	Report	Berchiche (yellow card) 8'; Berenguer (yellow card) 16'; N. Williams (yellow card) 78'; De Marcos (yellow card) 80'; Sancet (yellow card) 80'	Stadium: Benito Villamarín; Attendance: 45,876; Referee: Antonio Mateu Lahoz

20 March 2022 29	Celta Vigo	0–0	Real Betis	Vigo
16:15 CET (UTC+1)	Fontán (yellow card) 90+4'	Report	Carvalho (yellow card) 81'; Pezzella (yellow card) 90'	Stadium: Balaídos; Attendance: 13,149; Referee: Ricardo de Burgos Bengoetxea

3 April 2022 30	Real Betis	4–1	Osasuna	Seville
16:15 CEST (UTC+2)	Juanmi 34', 45+1'; Carvalho (yellow card) 38', (goal) 82'; Moreno 88'	Report	Budimir 65'; José Ángel (yellow card) 82'; D. García (yellow card) 87'; Ávila (yellow card) 90+1'	Stadium: Benito Villamarín; Attendance: 49,103; Referee: Valentín Pizarro Gómez

9 April 2022 31	Cádiz	1–2	Real Betis	Cádiz
14:00 CEST (UTC+2)	Alejo 58'; Alcaraz (yellow card) 66'	Report	Sabaly (yellow card) 25'; Tello 78'; Iglesias 85' (pen.); Bartra (yellow card) 89'	Stadium: Nuevo Mirandilla; Attendance: 18,063; Referee: Jesús Gil Manzano

15 April 2022 32	Real Sociedad	0–0	Real Betis	San Sebastián
21:00 CEST (UTC+2)	Rafinha (yellow card) 60'; Silva (yellow card) 90+1' (yellow-red card) 90+3'; Sørloth (yellow card) 90+2'	Report	Carvalho (yellow card) 37'; Rodríguez (yellow card) 75'; Bravo (yellow card) 90+1'; Bartra (yellow card) 90+2'	Stadium: Anoeta; Attendance: 28,893; Referee: Isidro Díaz de Mera Escuderos

19 April 2022 33	Real Betis	0–1	Elche	Seville
21:00 CEST (UTC+2)	Guardado (yellow card) 49'; Moreno (yellow card) 84'; Akouokou (red card) 90+3'	Report	Palacios (yellow card) 26'; Badía (yellow card) 79'; Morente 82'; Pérez (yellow card) 84'	Stadium: Benito Villamarín; Attendance: 43,257; Referee: Javier Alberola Rojas

2 May 2022 34	Getafe	0–0	Real Betis	Getafe
21:00 CEST (UTC+2)	Mitrović (yellow card) 31'	Report	Ruibal (yellow card) 51'	Stadium: Coliseum Alfonso Pérez; Attendance: 9,916; Referee: Adrián Cordero Vega

7 May 2022 35	Real Betis	1–2	Barcelona	Seville
21:00 CEST (UTC+2)	Bartra (yellow card) 72', (goal) 79'	Report	Busquets (yellow card) 64'; Fati 76'; Dani Alves (yellow card) 78'; Alba 90+4'	Stadium: Benito Villamarín; Attendance: 46,132; Referee: Antonio Mateu Lahoz

10 May 2022 36	Valencia	0–3	Real Betis	Valencia
19:00 CEST (UTC+2)	Alderete (yellow card) 31'	Report	Canales (yellow card) 45', (goal) 87'; Willian José 57'; Rodri (yellow card) 60'; Bartra (yellow card) 83'; Iglesias 90'	Stadium: Mestalla; Attendance: 28,091; Referee: Carlos del Cerro Grande

15 May 2022 37	Real Betis	2–0	Granada	Seville
19:30 CEST (UTC+2)	Juanmi 14', 89'	Report	Suárez (yellow card) 90+1'	Stadium: Benito Villamarín; Attendance: 45,016; Referee: Ricardo de Burgos Bengoetxea

20 May 2022 38	Real Madrid	0–0	Real Betis	Madrid
21:00 CEST (UTC+2)		Report		Stadium: Santiago Bernabéu; Attendance: 52,232; Referee: Santiago Jaime Latre

=== Copa del Rey ===
1 December 2021 First round	Alicante	0–4	Real Betis	Alcoy
21:00 CET (UTC+1)	Martínez (yellow card) 20'; Sanz (yellow card) 81'	Report	Tello 7'; Lainez 28'; Joaquín 47'; Bartra 52'; Hermoso (yellow card) 78'	Stadium: El Collao (Note: Alicante played its match at El Collao, in Alcoy instead of their regular stadium Antonio Solana in Alicante, as it did not meet the requirements established by the Royal Spanish Football Federation.); Referee: Carlos del Cerro Grande

15 December 2021 Second round	Talavera	2–4 (a.e.t.)	Real Betis	Talavera de la Reina
19:00 CET (UTC+1)	Góngora 7' (pen.); Añón (yellow card) 60'; Martín (yellow card) 70'; Perales 89'; Pichín (yellow card) 105+1'; Juanma (yellow card) 114'	Report	Iglesias 14'; Joaquín 61' (pen.); Juanmi (yellow card) 101'; Lainez 116'; Canales 119'	Stadium: Estadio El Prado; Referee: Alejandro Hernández Hernández

5 January 2022 Round of 32	Valladolid	0–3	Real Betis	Valladolid
20:00 CET (UTC+1)	Mesa (yellow card) 26'	Report	Carvalho 24'; Fekir 27'; Rodríguez (yellow card) 47'; Iglesias 50'	Stadium: José Zorrilla; Referee: Ricardo de Burgos Bengoetxea

16 January 2022 Round of 16	Real Betis	2–1	Sevilla	Seville
16:00 CET (UTC+1)	Fekir (yellow card) 1', (goal) 39'; Carvalho (yellow card) 61'; Canales 73'; Moreno (yellow card) 78'	Report	Ocampos (yellow card) 23'; Gómez 35'; Montiel (yellow card) 64'; Acuña (yellow card) 90+3'; Koundé (yellow card) 90+3'	Stadium: Benito Villamarín; Attendance: 0 Referee: Ricardo de Burgos Bengoetxea
Note: The match was originally played on 15 January, but was suspended in the 35th minute after Sevilla's Joan Jordán was hit in the head by an object thrown from the crowd. It was resumed the next day at 16:00 behind closed doors.

3 February 2022 Quarter-finals	Real Sociedad	0–4	Real Betis	San Sebastián
20:00 CET (UTC+1)	Zaldúa (yellow card) 82'	Report	Juanmi 12', 57'; Bartra (yellow card) 38'; Willian José 83' (pen.); Ruibal 87'	Stadium: Anoeta; Referee: Juan Martínez Munuera

9 February 2022 Semi-finals; First leg	Rayo Vallecano	1–2	Real Betis	Madrid
21:00 CET (UTC+1)	Á. García 5'; Valentín (yellow card) 65'	Report	Iglesias 26'; Carvalho 68'; Silva (yellow card) 78'	Stadium: Campo de Fútbol de Vallecas; Attendance: 9,034; Referee: José María Sánchez Martínez

3 March 2022 Semi-finals; Second leg	Real Betis	1–1 (3–2 agg.)	Rayo Vallecano	Seville
21:00 CET (UTC+1)	Willian José (yellow card) 79'; Iglesias 90+2'	Report	Balliu (yellow card) 71'; Bebé 80'	Stadium: Benito Villamarín; Attendance: 50,916; Referee: Juan Martínez Munuera

23 April 2022 Final	Real Betis	1–1 (a.e.t.) (5–4 p)	Valencia	Seville
22:00 CEST (UTC+2)	Iglesias 11', (yellow card) 95'; Carvalho (yellow card) 14'; Pezzella (yellow card) 72'; Tello (yellow card) 113'	Report	Gabriel (yellow card) 5'; Duro 30'; Guillamón (yellow card) 74'; Alderete (yellow card) 90+2'; Correia (yellow card) 90+3'; Soler (yellow card) 98'	Stadium: La Cartuja; Attendance: 53,387; Referee: Alejandro Hernández Hernández
	Penalties
	Willian José (penalty scored); Joaquín (penalty scored); Guardado (penalty scored); Tello (penalty scored); Miranda (penalty scored)		(penalty scored) Soler; (penalty scored) Račić; (penalty scored) Guedes; (penalty missed) Musah; (penalty scored) Gayà

=== UEFA Europa League ===
==== Group stage ====
The draw for the group stage was held on 27 August 2021.

Pos	Team	Pld	W	D	L	GF	GA	GD	Pts	Qualification	LEV	BET	CEL	FER
1	(Germany) Bayer Leverkusen	6	4	1	1	14	5	+9	13	Advance to round of 16	—	4–0	3–2	2–1
2	(Spain) Real Betis	6	3	1	2	12	12	0	10	Advance to knockout round play-offs	1–1	—	4–3	2–0
3	(Scotland) Celtic	6	3	0	3	13	15	−2	9	Transfer to Europa Conference League	0–4	3–2	—	2–0
4	(Hungary) Ferencváros	6	1	0	5	5	12	−7	3		1–0	1–3	2–3	—

Source: UEFA
Rules for classification: Group stage tiebreakers

16 September 2021 1	Real Betis (Spain)	4–3	(Scotland) Celtic	Seville, Spain
18:45 CEST (UTC+2)	Guardado (yellow card) 20'; Miranda 32'; Fekir (yellow card) 33'; Juanmi 35', 53'; Iglesias 51'; Ruibal (yellow card) 63'; Moreno (yellow card) 90+4'	Report	Soro (yellow card) 9'; Ajeti 15'; Juranović 27' (pen.); Carter-Vickers (yellow card) 39'; Ralston 87'	Stadium: Benito Villamarín; Attendance: 30,893; Referee: Fran Jović (Croatia)

30 September 2021 2	Ferencváros (Hungary)	1–3	(Spain) Real Betis	Budapest, Hungary
21:00 CEST (UTC+2)	Uzuni 44'; Laïdouni (yellow card) 87'	Report	Fekir 17'; Akouokou (yellow card) 41'; Montoya (yellow card) 59'; Wingo 76' (o.g.); Rodri (yellow card) 79'; Tello 90+5'	Stadium: Ferencváros Stadion; Attendance: 16,759; Referee: Roi Reinshreiber (Israel)

21 October 2021 3	Real Betis (Spain)	1–1	(Germany) Bayer Leverkusen	Seville, Spain
18:45 CEST (UTC+2)	Miranda (yellow card) 10'; Pezzella (yellow card) 71'; Iglesias 75' (pen.)	Report	Alario (yellow card) 50'; Tapsoba (yellow card) 62'; Hincapié (yellow card) 71'; Andrich 82'; Diaby (yellow card) 86'	Stadium: Benito Villamarín; Attendance: 39,230; Referee: Bartosz Frankowski (Poland)

4 November 2021 4	Bayer Leverkusen (Germany)	4–0	(Spain) Real Betis	Leverkusen, Germany
21:00 CET (UTC+1)	Adli (yellow card) 10'; Diaby 42', 52'; Andrich (yellow card) 44'; Wirtz 86'; Amiri 90'; Demirbay (red card) 90+3'	Report	Fekir (red card) 90+3'	Stadium: BayArena; Attendance: 15,208; Referee: Anthony Taylor (England)

25 November 2021 5	Real Betis (Spain)	2–0	(Hungary) Ferencváros	Seville, Spain
18:45 CET (UTC+1)	Tello 5'; Canales 52'	Report	Botka (yellow card) 42'; Vécsei (yellow card) 49'; Laïdouni (yellow card) 79'	Stadium: Benito Villamarín; Attendance: 30,137; Referee: Ruddy Buquet (France)

9 December 2021 6	Celtic (Scotland)	3–2	(Spain) Real Betis	Glasgow, Scotland
20:00 GMT (UTC±0)	Welsh 3'; Soro (yellow card) 24'; Shaw (yellow card) 33'; Henderson 72'; Turnbull 78' (pen.)	Report	Lainez (yellow card) 24'; Pezzella (yellow card) 49'; Ruibal (yellow card) 55'; Bain 69' (o.g.); Iglesias 75'	Stadium: Celtic Park; Attendance: 54,548; Referee: Daniel Stefański (Poland)

==== Knockout phase ====
===== Knockout round play-offs =====
The knockout round play-offs draw was held on 13 December 2021.

17 February 2022 First leg	Zenit Saint Petersburg (Russia)	2–3	(Spain) Real Betis	Saint Petersburg, Russia
18:45 CET (UTC+1)	Rakitskyi (yellow card) 7'; Dzyuba 25'; Malcom 28'; Barrios (yellow card) 90+2'	Report	Rodríguez 8'; Willian José 18'; Guardado 41'; Tello (yellow card) 75'	Stadium: Krestovsky Stadium; Attendance: 28,936; Referee: Benoît Bastien (France)

24 February 2022 Second leg	Real Betis (Spain)	0–0 (3–2 agg.)	(Russia) Zenit Saint Petersburg	Seville, Spain
21:00 CET (UTC+1)	Rodríguez (yellow card) 28'	Report	Krugovoy (yellow card) 42'; Barrios (yellow card) 55'; Yerokhin (yellow card) 90+1'	Stadium: Benito Villamarín; Attendance: 44,236; Referee: Halil Umut Meler (Turkey)

===== Round of 16 =====
The draw for the round of 16 was held on 25 February 2022.

9 March 2022 First leg	Real Betis (Spain)	1–2	(Germany) Eintracht Frankfurt	Seville, Spain
18:45 CET (UTC+1)	Fekir (yellow card) 23', (goal) 30'	Report	Kostić 14'; Sow (yellow card) 25'; Kamada 32'; Borré (penalty missed) 52'; Hinteregger (yellow card) 75'	Stadium: Benito Villamarín; Attendance: 36,574; Referee: Marco Guida (Italy)

17 March 2022 Second leg	Eintracht Frankfurt (Germany)	1–1 (a.e.t.) (3–2 agg.)	(Spain) Real Betis	Frankfurt, Germany
21:00 CET (UTC+1)	Rodríguez 120+1' (o.g.)	Report	Juanmi (yellow card) 63'; Pezzella (yellow card) 70'; Iglesias 90'; Ruibal (yellow card) 112'; Rodríguez (yellow card) 120'	Stadium: Waldstadion; Attendance: 25,000; Referee: Michael Oliver (England)

== Statistics ==
=== Appearances and goals ===
Last updated 20 May 2022.

No.	Pos	Nat	Player	Total		La Liga		Copa del Rey		UEFA Europa League	
No.	Pos	Nat	Player	Apps	Goals	Apps	Goals	Apps	Goals	Apps	Goals
Goalkeepers
1	GK	(Spain) ESP	Joel Robles	3	0	0	0	3	0	0	0
13	GK	(Portugal) POR	Rui Silva	32	0	21+1	0	3	0	6+1	0
25	GK	(Chile) CHI	Claudio Bravo	23	0	17	0	2	0	4	0
Defenders
2	DF	(Spain) ESP	Martín Montoya	10	0	6	0	0	0	3+1	0
3	DF	(Spain) ESP	Edgar González	35	1	14+7	1	6+1	0	7	0
5	DF	(Spain) ESP	Marc Bartra	32	2	23	1	5	1	4	0
6	DF	(Spain) ESP	Víctor Ruiz	23	0	17+1	0	2+1	0	2	0
15	DF	(Spain) ESP	Álex Moreno	45	5	28+2	5	6+2	0	3+4	0
16	DF	(Argentina) ARG	Germán Pezzella	34	1	22+1	1	4	0	7	0
19	DF	(Spain) ESP	Héctor Bellerín	32	0	22+1	0	4+1	0	3+1	0
23	DF	(Senegal) SEN	Youssouf Sabaly	17	0	9+1	0	3+1	0	3	0
33	DF	(Spain) ESP	Juan Miranda	23	1	9+4	0	2+1	0	6+1	1
36	DF	(Spain) ESP	José Calderón	1	0	0+1	0	0	0	0	0
37	DF	(Spain) ESP	Kike Hermoso	3	1	1	1	0+2	0	0	0
Midfielders
4	MF	(Ivory Coast) CIV	Paul Akouokou	11	0	6+2	0	1	0	2	0
10	MF	(Spain) ESP	Sergio Canales	48	8	33+1	5	4+2	2	5+3	1
14	MF	(Portugal) POR	William Carvalho	49	4	20+13	2	8	2	4+4	0
18	MF	(Mexico) MEX	Andrés Guardado	36	1	17+11	0	0+3	0	4+1	1
20	MF	(Mexico) MEX	Diego Lainez	13	2	1+6	0	1+1	2	1+3	0
21	MF	(Argentina) ARG	Guido Rodríguez	47	2	29+3	1	6	0	7+2	1
22	MF	(Spain) ESP	Víctor Camarasa	7	0	0+7	0	0	0	0	0
28	MF	(Spain) ESP	Rodri	28	1	10+11	1	1+3	0	1+2	0
Forwards
7	FW	(Spain) ESP	Juanmi	46	20	26+7	16	5+1	2	3+4	2
8	FW	(France) FRA	Nabil Fekir	47	10	33+1	6	6	2	7	2
9	FW	(Spain) ESP	Borja Iglesias	51	19	18+15	10	7+1	5	6+4	4
11	FW	(Spain) ESP	Cristian Tello	34	5	5+18	2	3+3	1	2+3	2
12	FW	(Brazil) BRA	Willian José	44	10	19+13	8	1+3	1	4+4	1
17	FW	(Spain) ESP	Joaquín	36	2	2+19	0	2+3	2	8+2	0
24	FW	(Spain) ESP	Aitor Ruibal	33	1	9+10	0	3+3	1	7+1	0
35	FW	(Spain) ESP	Raúl García	2	0	0+1	0	0+1	0	0	0
Players who have made an appearance or had a squad number this season but have left the club either permanently or on loan
16	FW	(Spain) ESP	Loren	0	0	0	0	0	0	0	0
27	FW	(Spain) ESP	Rober	8	0	1+3	0	0+1	0	1+2	0

=== Goalscorers ===
As of 20 May 2022

Rank	Player	La Liga	Copa del Rey	Europa League	Total
1	(Spain) Juanmi	16	2	2	20
2	(Spain) Borja Iglesias	10	5	4	19
3	(France) Nabil Fekir	6	2	2	10
3	(Brazil) Willian José	8	1	1	10
5	(Spain) Sergio Canales	5	2	1	8
6	(Spain) Álex Moreno	5	0	0	5
6	(Spain) Cristian Tello	2	1	2	5
8	(Portugal) William Carvalho	2	2	0	4
10	(Spain) Marc Bartra	1	1	0	2
10	(Mexico) Diego Lainez	0	2	0	2
10	(Argentina) Guido Rodríguez	1	0	1	2
10	(Spain) Joaquín	0	2	0	2
13	(Spain) Edgar González	1	0	0	1
13	(Argentina) Germán Pezzella	1	0	0	1
13	(Spain) Juan Miranda	0	0	1	1
13	(Spain) Kike Hermoso	1	0	0	1
13	(Mexico) Andrés Guardado	0	0	1	1
13	(Spain) Rodri	1	0	0	1
13	(Spain) Aitor Ruibal	0	1	0	1
Own goals		2	0	2	4
Total		62	21	17	100
