= Paul Akouokou =

Ivorian footballer (born 1997)

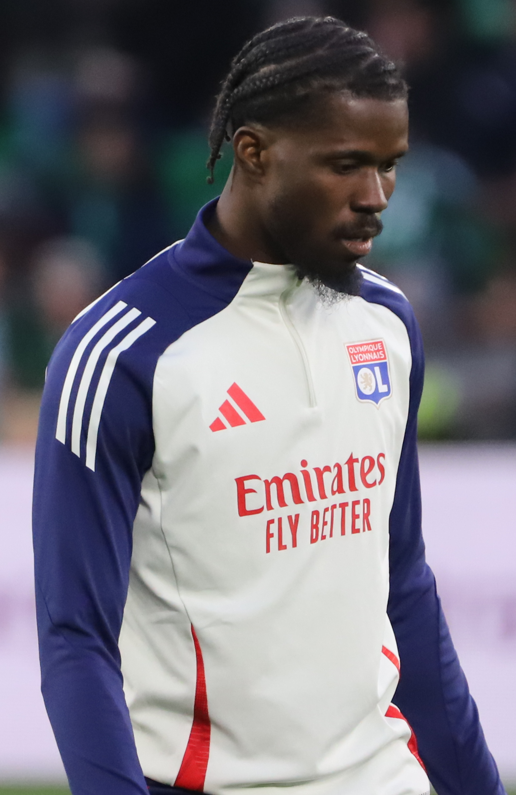
- Akouokou in 2025

Personal information
- Full name: Edgar Paul Akouokou
- Date of birth: 20 December 1997 (age 28)
- Place of birth: Abidjan, Ivory Coast
- Height: 1.81 m (5 ft 11 in)
- Position: Defensive midfielder

Team information
- Current team: Lyon
- Number: 4

Youth career
- Ekenäs IF

Senior career*
Years	Team	Apps	(Gls)
2016–2018	Ekenäs IF	35	(2)
2017–2018	→ Beitar Jerusalem (loan)	12	(0)
2018	→ Hapoel Rishon LeZion (loan)	16	(3)
2018–2020	Betis B	44	(0)
2020–2023	Betis	32	(0)
2023–	Lyon	10	(0)
2026–	Lyon B	1	(0)
2025–2026	→ Zaragoza (loan)	11	(1)

International career^{‡}
2022–	Ivory Coast	4	(0)
- * Club domestic league appearances and goals as of 19 September 2026 ‡ National team caps and goals as of 9 June 2022

Edgar Paul Akouokou (born 20 December 1997) is an Ivorian professional footballer who plays as a defensive midfielder for Ligue 1 club Lyon, and the Ivory Coast national team.

== Club career ==
=== Early career ===
Akouokou started his career with Finnish side Ekenäs IF in 2016, playing in the second-tier level Ykkönen. In January 2017, he went on a trial at Ligue 1 side Angers SCO.

On 27 August 2017, Akouokou moved to Israeli Premier League side Beitar Jerusalem on a loan deal until May 2018. After being sparingly used, he moved to Hapoel Rishon LeZion of the Liga Leumit in the following February, also on loan.

=== Betis ===
On 21 November 2018, Akouokou left Finland after agreeing to a deal with La Liga side Real Betis for an undisclosed fee; he was initially assigned to the club's reserve team in Tercera División. On 10 September 2020, after helping the B-team to achieve a promotion to Segunda División B, he renewed this contract with Betis until 2024, and was promoted to the first team.

Akouokou made his La Liga debut on 20 September 2020, replacing goalscorer William Carvalho late into a 2–0 home win over Real Valladolid.

=== Lyon ===
On 1 September 2023, Akouokou signed a four-year contract with Ligue 1 side Lyon. Transfer fee was announced to be €3 million and Betis have a sell-on clause.

On 6 March 2025, Paul Akouokou made his return to official competition with Olympique Lyonnais by coming on in added time of a Europa League match in Bucharest, more than a year after his last appearance in the Lyon jersey. His previous match dates back to 23 February 2024, during a brief appearance against FC Metz in Ligue 1. Recruited on 1 September 2023 from Real Betis, he only played eight games with OL during his first season, before disappearing from the match sheets. Not registered on the UEFA list for the first part of the 2024-2025 season, he was reinstated in the squad following the departure of several players during the winter transfer window.

On 10 April 2025, Akouokou was named in the starting lineup for the UEFA Europa League quarter-final first leg against Manchester United, partnering Jordan Veretout in central midfield. This marked his first start for the club in over sixteen months, the previous one dating back to 6 December 2023, against Olympique de Marseille.

==== Loan to Zaragoza ====
On 1 September 2025, Akouokou returned to Spain after agreeing to a one-year loan deal with Real Zaragoza in Segunda División.

== Career statistics ==
=== Club ===
As of match played 19 September 2026

Appearances and goals by club, season and competition
Club	Season	League			National cup		League cup		Continental		Other		Total	
Club	Season	Division	Apps	Goals	Apps	Goals	Apps	Goals	Apps	Goals	Apps	Goals	Apps	Goals
Ekenäs IF	2016	Ykkönen	21	1	0	0	—		—		—		21	1
Ekenäs IF	2017	Ykkönen	14	1	5	0	—		—		—		19	1
Ekenäs IF	Total		35	2	5	0	0	0	0	0	0	0	40	2
Beitar Jerusalem (loan)	2017–18	Israeli Premier League	12	0	1	0	1	0	—		—		14	0
Hapoel Rishon LeZion (loan)	2017–18	Liga Leumit	16	3	—		—		—		—		16	3
Betis B	2018–19	Tercera División	20	0	—		—		—		—		20	0
Betis B	2019–20	Tercera División	24	0	—		—		—		2 (Note: Appearance(s) in Promotion Playoffs)	0	26	0
Betis B	Total		44	0	0	0	0	0	0	0	2	0	46	0
Betis	2020–21	La Liga	10	0	3	0	—		0	0	—		13	0
Betis	2021–22	La Liga	8	0	1	0	—		2 (Note: Appearances in UEFA Europa League)	0	—		11	0
Betis	2022–23	La Liga	12	0	1	0	—		5	0	0	0	18	0
Betis	2023–24	La Liga	2	0	0	0	—		0	0	0	0	2	0
Betis	Total		32	0	4	0	0	0	7	0	0	0	43	0
Lyon	2023–24	Ligue 1	8	0	1	0	—		—		—		9	0
Lyon	2024–25	Ligue 1	2	0	0	0	—		3	0	—		5	0
Lyon	2026–27	Ligue 1	0	0	0	0	—		0	0	—		0	0
Lyon	Total		10	0	1	0	—		3	0	—		14	0
Lyon B	2026–27	Championnat National 2	1	0	—		—		—		—		1	0
Real Zaragoza (loan)	2025–26	Segunda División	11	1	1	0	—		—		—		12	1
Career total			161	6	13	0	1	0	10	0	2	0	187	6

=== International ===
As of match played 9 June 2022

Ivory Coast
Year	Apps	Goals
2022	4	0
Total	4	0

== Honours ==
Betis

- Copa del Rey: 2021–22

Lyon

- Coupe de France runner-up: 2023–24
