= Àlex Moreno =

Spanish footballer (born 1993)

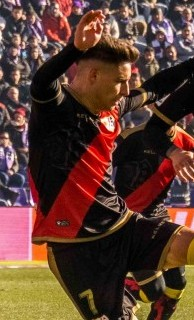
- Moreno with Rayo Vallecano in 2019

Personal information
- Full name: Alexandre Moreno Lopera
- Date of birth: 8 June 1993 (age 33)
- Place of birth: Sant Sadurní, Spain
- Height: 1.79 m (5 ft 10 in)
- Positions: Left-back; winger

Team information
- Current team: Girona
- Number: 24

Youth career
- Vilafranca
- 2011–2012: Barcelona

Senior career*
Years	Team	Apps	(Gls)
2011	Vilafranca	1	(0)
2012–2013	Llagostera	27	(2)
2013–2014	Mallorca	31	(2)
2013–2014	Mallorca B	2	(1)
2014–2019	Rayo Vallecano	124	(8)
2015–2016	→ Elche (loan)	40	(2)
2019–2023	Betis	99	(5)
2023–2025	Aston Villa	40	(2)
2024–2025	→ Nottingham Forest (loan)	15	(0)
2025–	Girona	42	(0)

International career^{‡}
2022–	Catalonia	2	(0)
- * Club domestic league appearances and goals as of 20:23, 24 October 2026 (UTC) ‡ National team caps and goals as of 00:27, 3 June 2025 (UTC)

Alexandre "Àlex" Moreno Lopera (Spanish pronunciation: [aleɣˈsandɾe ˈaleɣs moˈɾeno loˈpeɾa]; born 8 June 1993) is a Spanish professional footballer who plays as a left-back or left winger for Segunda División club Girona.

He spent most of his career with Rayo Vallecano and Betis, achieving La Liga totals of 177 games and six goals over seven seasons and winning the 2021–22 Copa del Rey with the latter club. In January 2023, he signed with Aston Villa, who loaned him to Nottingham Forest one year later.

Moreno represented the Catalonia national side, making his debut in May 2022.

== Club career ==
=== Early years and Mallorca ===
Born in Sant Sadurní d'Anoia, Barcelona, Catalonia, Moreno graduated from local Vilafranca's academy, making his senior debut in 2010–11 in the Tercera División. He signed with Barcelona in April 2011, being assigned to the youth side; he started his career as a winger.

In July 2012, Moreno joined Segunda División B club Llagostera. He finished the campaign with 1,333 minutes of action, scoring twice.

On 4 July 2013, Moreno moved to Mallorca, recently relegated to the second division. He played his first professional match on 18 August, in a 4–0 away loss against Sabadell in the Segunda División.

Moreno scored his first goal in division two on 4 January 2014, the last in a 2–2 draw at Las Palmas. He featured regularly during the season, as his team narrowly avoided another drop.

=== Rayo Vallecano ===
On 15 July 2014, Moreno signed a four-year deal with Rayo Vallecano. He made his La Liga debut on 14 September, coming on as a late substitute in a 2–3 home defeat against Elche.

Moreno was loaned to Elche of the second tier for one year on 13 August 2015. He was an undisputed starter after returning to the Campo de Fútbol de Vallecas, netting three times from 40 appearances in 2017–18 as the side returned to the top flight as champions.

=== Betis ===
On 21 August 2019, after suffering relegation, Moreno joined Real Betis on a five-year contract. He scored his first goal for the Andalusians the following 11 January, in the 3–0 win over Club Portugalete in the second round of the Copa del Rey. His first in the league came on 24 October 2021, helping the hosts to beat Rayo Vallecano 3–2. He added a brace on 12 December, in a 4–0 defeat of Real Sociedad also at the Estadio Benito Villamarín.

Moreno made eight appearances in the 2021–22 Spanish Cup, as they won the tournament for the third time in their history; this included 105 minutes of the final against Valencia, won on penalties in Seville.

=== Aston Villa ===
On 11 January 2023, Moreno joined Premier League club Aston Villa for an undisclosed fee, signing a three-and-a-half-year deal; he was given the number 15 shirt. He made his league debut two days later, replacing the injured Lucas Digne early into an eventual 2–1 home win over Leeds United.

On 20 May 2023, Moreno suffered a hamstring injury during a 1–1 draw against Liverpool; following surgery, he was estimated to be sidelined for between three and four months. He made his return on 30 November, closing the 2–1 home victory over Legia Warsaw in the group stage of the UEFA Europa Conference League for his first goal for the Villans. He scored his first in the league on 17 December, equalising an eventual 2–1 away defeat of Brentford.

On 21 August 2024, Moreno moved to Nottingham Forest of the same league on a season-long loan.

=== Girona ===
Moreno returned to Spain on 22 August 2025, signing with top-tier Girona for an undisclosed fee.

== International career ==
Moreno made his debut for the non-FIFA Catalonia side on 25 May 2022, starting in a 6–0 win over Jamaica.

== Career statistics ==
As of match played 27 October 2026

Appearances and goals by club, season and competition
Club	Season	League			National cup (Note: Includes Copa del Rey, FA Cup)		League cup (Note: Includes EFL Cup)		Europe		Total	
Club	Season	Division	Apps	Goals	Apps	Goals	Apps	Goals	Apps	Goals	Apps	Goals
Llagostera	2012–13	Segunda División B	27	2	4	0	—		—		31	2
Mallorca	2013–14	Segunda División	31	2	1	0	—		—		32	2
Mallorca B	2013–14	Tercera División	2	1	—		—		—		2	1
Rayo Vallecano	2014–15	La Liga	11	0	2	1	—		—		13	1
Rayo Vallecano	2016–17	Segunda División	37	4	1	0	—		—		38	4
Rayo Vallecano	2017–18	Segunda División	40	3	0	0	—		—		40	3
Rayo Vallecano	2018–19	La Liga	36	1	0	0	—		—		36	1
Rayo Vallecano	Total		124	8	3	1	—		—		127	9
Elche (loan)	2015–16	Segunda División	40	2	1	0	—		—		41	2
Betis	2019–20	La Liga	31	0	2	1	—		—		33	1
Betis	2020–21	La Liga	23	0	2	0	—		—		25	0
Betis	2021–22	La Liga	30	5	8	0	—		7 (Note: Appearances in UEFA Europa League)	0	45	5
Betis	2022–23	La Liga	15	0	0	0	—		4	0	19	0
Betis	Total		99	5	12	1	—		11	0	122	6
Aston Villa	2022–23	Premier League	19	0	—		—		—		19	0
Aston Villa	2023–24	Premier League	21	2	3	0	0	0	5 (Note: Appearances in UEFA Europa Conference League)	1	29	3
Aston Villa	Total		40	2	3	0	0	0	5	1	48	3
Nottingham Forest (loan)	2024–25	Premier League	15	0	3	0	1	0	—		19	0
Girona	2025–26	La Liga	31	0	0	0	—		—		31	0
Girona	2026–27	Segunda División	11	0	1	0	—		—		12	0
Girona	Total		42	0	1	0	—		—		43	0
Career total			420	22	28	2	1	0	16	1	464	25

== Honours ==
Rayo Vallecano

- Segunda División: 2017–18

Betis

- Copa del Rey: 2021–22
