= Edgar González (footballer, born 1997) =

Spanish footballer

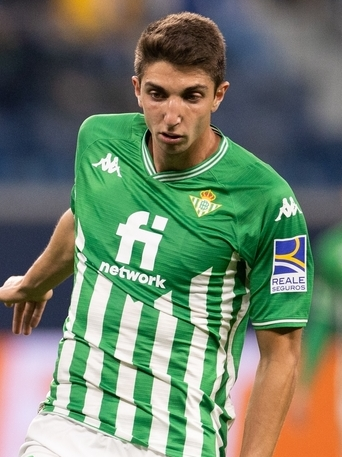
- González with Betis in 2022

Personal information
- Full name: Edgar González Estrada
- Date of birth: 1 April 1997 (age 29)
- Place of birth: Sallent, Spain
- Height: 1.93 m (6 ft 4 in)
- Positions: Centre-back; defensive midfielder

Team information
- Current team: Sabadell (on loan from Almería)

Youth career
- Cornellà
- 2015–2016: Espanyol

Senior career*
Years	Team	Apps	(Gls)
2016–2018	Espanyol B	0	(0)
2016–2018	→ Cornellà (loan)	43	(0)
2018–2020	Betis B	50	(4)
2018–2023	Betis	56	(1)
2020–2021	→ Oviedo (loan)	37	(3)
2023–	Almería	71	(4)
2025–2026	→ Hajduk Split (loan)	6	(0)
2026	→ Andorra (loan)	3	(0)
2026–	→ Sabadell (loan)	6	(1)

International career
2022–	Catalonia	1	(0)
- * Club domestic league appearances and goals as of 28 September 2026

Edgar González Estrada (born 1 April 1997) is a Spanish professional footballer who plays as a centre-back or defensive midfielder for CE Sabadell FC, on loan from UD Almería.

== Club career ==
Born in Sallent, Barcelona, Catalonia, González joined RCD Espanyol's youth setup in July 2015, from UE Cornellà. On 1 July 2016, after finishing his formation, he returned to his previous club Cornellà, on loan for one year.

González made his senior debut on 31 August 2016, playing the last 33 minutes in a 2–1 home defeat of UD San Sebastián de los Reyes, for the season's Copa del Rey. The following 3 July, after 13 appearances, he renewed his contract with the Pericos until 2020 and remained on loan at Cornellà for one further season.

On 6 July 2018, González agreed to a contract with Real Betis, being initially assigned to the reserves in Tercera División. He made his first team debut on 1 November, playing the full 90 minutes in a 1–0 away success over Racing de Santander, also for the national cup.

González made his La Liga debut on 23 November 2019, starting in a 2–1 home win against Valencia CF. The following 21 July, he renewed his contract until 2023 and was promoted to the first team.

On 3 September 2020, González was loaned to Segunda División side Real Oviedo for the season. He scored his first professional goals on 8 November, netting a brace in a 4–0 home routing of CD Castellón.

Back to the Verdiblancos in July 2021, González scored his first goal in the top tier on 13 February 2022, netting his team's second in a 4–2 away win over Levante UD. On 29 March, he renewed his contract with the club until 2025.

On 6 July 2023, González signed a five-year contract with fellow top-tier side UD Almería. On 26 August 2025, he moved abroad for the first time in his career, joining Croatian side HNK Hajduk Split on a one-year loan deal.

González's loan was cut short on 9 January 2026, and he moved to FC Andorra in the second division also in a temporary deal three days later. On 5 August, he joined fellow league team CE Sabadell FC on a one-year loan deal.

== Career statistics ==
=== Club ===
As of 11 August 2023

Appearances and goals by club, season and competition
Club	Season	League			Copa del Rey		Europe		Other		Total	
Club	Season	Division	Apps	Goals	Apps	Goals	Apps	Goals	Apps	Goals	Apps	Goals
Espanyol B	2015–16	Segunda División B	0	0	—		—		—		0	0
Cornellà (loan)	2016–17	Segunda División B	13	0	2	0	—		—		15	0
Cornellà (loan)	2017–18	Segunda División B	30	0	0	0	—		2 (Note: Appearances in Segunda División B promotion play-offs)	0	32	0
Cornellà (loan)	Total		43	0	2	0	—		2	0	47	0
Betis B	2018–19	Tercera División	38	2	—		—		—		38	2
Betis B	2019–20	Tercera División	12	2	—		—		2 (Note: Appearances in Tercera División promotion play-offs)	0	14	2
Betis B	Total		50	4	—		—		2	0	52	4
Betis	2018–19	La Liga	0	0	1	0	0	0	—		1	0
Betis	2019–20	La Liga	10	0	3	0	—		—		13	0
Betis	2021–22	La Liga	21	1	7	0	7 (Note: Appearances in UEFA Europa League)	0	—		35	1
Betis	2022–23	La Liga	25	0	0	0	4	0	0	0	29	0
Betis	Total		56	1	11	0	11	0	0	0	78	1
Oviedo (loan)	2020–21	Segunda División	37	3	1	0	—		—		38	3
Almería	2023–24	La Liga	1	0	0	0	—		—		1	0
Career total			187	8	14	0	11	0	4	0	216	8

== Honours ==
Betis

- Copa del Rey: 2021–22
