= Andrés Guardado =

Mexican footballer (born 1986)

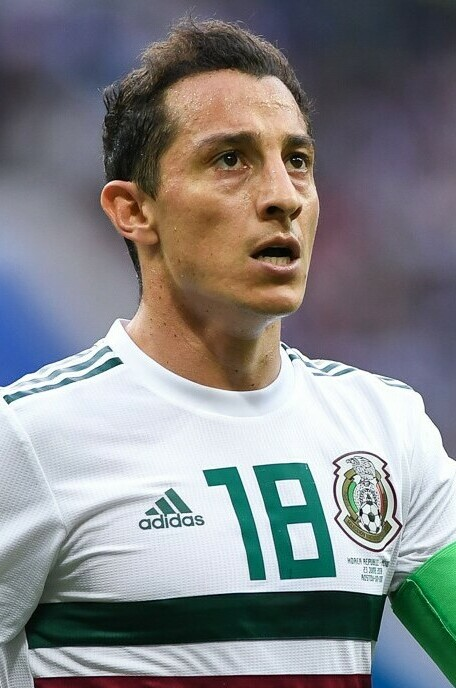
- Guardado with Mexico at the 2018 FIFA World Cup

Personal information
- Full name: José Andrés Guardado Hernández
- Date of birth: 28 September 1986 (age 40)
- Place of birth: Guadalajara, Jalisco, Mexico
- Height: 1.69 m (5 ft 7 in)
- Position: Midfielder

Team information
- Current team: Mexico (assistant)

Youth career
- 1993–2005: Atlas

Senior career*
| Years | Team | Apps | (Gls) |
| 2005–2007 | Atlas | 64 | (6) |
| 2007–2012 | Deportivo La Coruña | 137 | (23) |
| 2012–2015 | Valencia | 48 | (1) |
| 2014 | → Bayer Leverkusen (loan) | 4 | (0) |
| 2014–2015 | → PSV (loan) | 28 | (1) |
| 2015–2017 | PSV | 52 | (3) |
| 2017–2024 | Betis | 178 | (4) |
| 2024–2025 | León | 34 | (2) |
| Total | | 545 | (40) |

International career
| 2005–2024 | Mexico | 182 | (29) |

Managerial career
- 2026–: Mexico (assistant)
Medal record
Men's football
Representing Mexico
CONCACAF Gold Cup
| Winner | 2011 United States | Team |
| Winner | 2015 United States-Canada | Team |
| Winner | 2019 United States-Costa Rica–Jamaica | Team |
| Runner-up | 2007 United States | Team |
Copa America
| Third place | 2007 Venezuela | Team |
- * Club domestic league appearances and goals

José Andrés Guardado Hernández (Spanish pronunciation: [anˈdɾes ɣwaɾˈðaðo]; born 28 September 1986) is a Mexican professional football manager and former professional footballer who played as a midfielder.

Popularly known as Principito (Spanish for Little Prince), Guardado came through the youth ranks at Atlas, making his professional debut in 2005 before signing with Spain's Deportivo two years later, where he spent five seasons. In 2012 he joined Valencia, with brief loan stints at Bayer Leverkusen and PSV, before permanently joining the latter club in 2015 and winning two Eredivisie titles and two Johan Cruyff Shield titles. He returned to Spain in 2017 with Real Betis, where he won a Copa del Rey and made 218 appearances before returning to his native Mexico in 2024 to join León. He retired from professional football after the end of the 2024–25 season.

A Mexican international player from 2005 to 2024, Guardado represented the country in five World Cups, four Gold Cups–winning the 2011, 2015 and 2019 tournaments–two Copa Américas and two Confederations Cups. He is the most-capped player in the history of the national team with 180 appearances, and joint tenth on the all-time scorer list with 28 goals. He is regarded as one of the best North American players of all time.

== Club career ==
=== Atlas ===
Born in Guadalajara, Jalisco, to Andrés Manuel Guardado and Teresa Hernández, Andrés Guardado began playing professionally for local side Atlas, joining the team's youth system at the age of seven and going on to appear in two full Primera División seasons. He made his league debut on 20 August 2005, in a 3–2 home win against C.F. Pachuca, and on 15 October, scored his first goal against Tigres UANL in a 2–1 away victory. At the end of the tournament, he was voted best rookie.

On 19 August 2006, Guardado scored his first professional brace against Club América in a 2–0 home victory, both of them being long-range shots from outside the box. His performances in his second season led him to win back-to-back (Apertura and Clausura) awards for best full-back.

In the summer of 2006, press speculation linked Guardado to several Serie A teams as well as Real Madrid, but Deportivo de La Coruña moved quickly and made an offer of €7 million for 75% of his rights. An offer was accepted and the transfer was finalized on 7 July 2007, making him the most expensive ever Mexican player at the time; Atlas retained a 25% sell-on-fee as long as it held the remaining 25% of his rights.

Guardado played his final match at the Estadio Jalisco in a friendly against the Argentine champions San Lorenzo de Almagro, featuring 30 minutes. At half-time, he was awarded the club's highest honor, the Athletic Excellence Award.

=== Deportivo ===
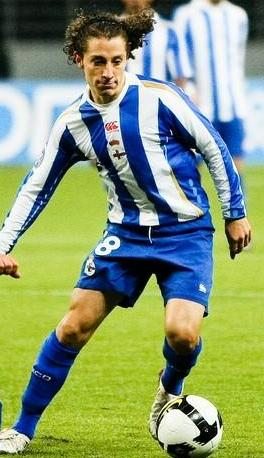
Guardado in action for Deportivo in 2008

Guardado was officially introduced on 24 July 2007, with the Spanish team giving him the number 18 shirt. He made his La Liga debut on 26 August in a 3–0 home loss to UD Almería and on 16 September scored his first goal against Real Betis, attacking a long throw-in at the back post, in which his attempt was described as "karate style" finish, in a 1–0 victory. He finished his first season with 26 games and five goals as Depor finished in ninth position, eventually qualifying to the UEFA Intertoto Cup – and the subsequent UEFA Cup, where he scored in a 3–0 group stage home win over Feyenoord; he was voted by fans as the best player.

Halfway through his second year, fans chose Guardado as the best player of 2008. Coach Miguel Ángel Lotina stated that he was a key player for Deportivo, and admired his talent and character. He solidified himself as first choice, providing several assists and being charged with set pieces; he was also hampered by several injuries, however.

On 20 September 2010, Guardado scored a brace within seven minutes of each other, both penalties, in a 2–2 draw against Getafe CF. On 15 May 2011, he made his 100th La Liga appearance in a scoreless draw at FC Barcelona, the third Mexican to achieve this feat behind Rafael Márquez and Hugo Sánchez. He only managed to take part in 20 matches in 2010–11, and the Galicians were relegated to Segunda División after 20 years.

In January 2012, Guardado was voted by fans as the best player of the previous year. On 27 March 2012 he confirmed that he would leave the Estadio Riazor on 30 June, and contributed career-bests of 11 goals and 12 assists as his team returned to the top level as champions. At the end of the campaign he was again voted by fans as best player, and was also named the competition's best attacking midfielder; additionally, he eventually surpassed Juan Carlos Valerón as the highest provider of assists.

=== Valencia ===
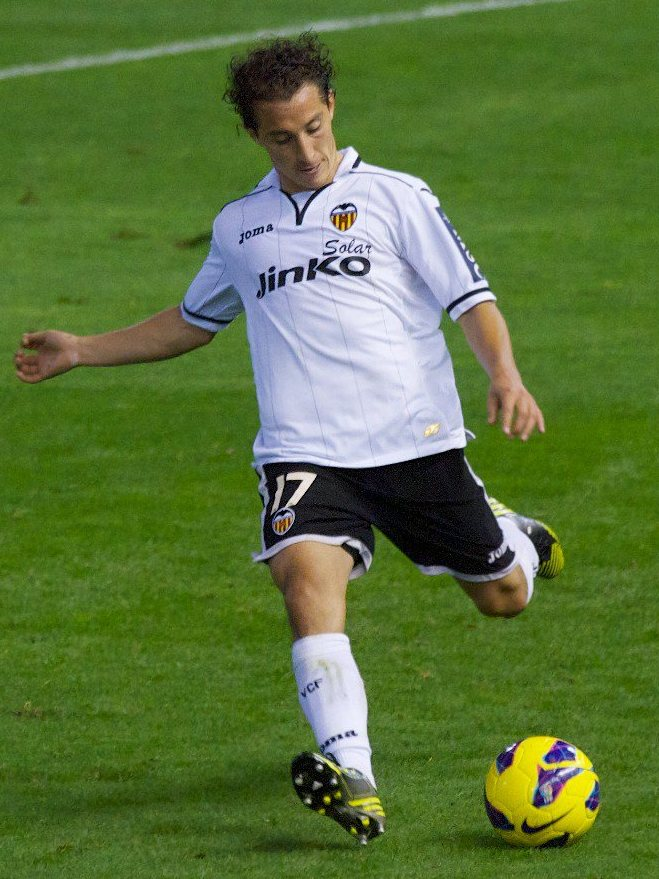
Guardado taking a shot for Valencia in 2012

On 28 May 2012, Guardado signed a four-year contract with Valencia CF. He made his debut on 19 August, playing 66 minutes in a 1–1 away draw against Real Madrid; two days later, following his five-year residence in the country, he attained his Spanish citizenship. His debut appearance in the UEFA Champions League took place on 12 September, in a 2–1 group stage loss at eventual winners Bayern Munich. During his first season he featured regularly at left-back, mainly due to the serious injury of Jérémy Mathieu.

Guardado scored his first goal for the Che on 12 May 2013, contributing to a 4–0 rout at Rayo Vallecano, and he featured mostly in the backline the following months. On 30 January 2014, Bundesliga club Bayer 04 Leverkusen announced that they had signed him on loan for the rest of the season, with an option to buy afterwards. He made his debut on 2 February in a 1–0 loss against 1. FC Kaiserslautern for the DFB-Pokal, playing as a left wing-back. Guardado's playing time at both the Mestalla Stadium and the BayArena was hampered by injuries and loss of form.

=== PSV Eindhoven ===
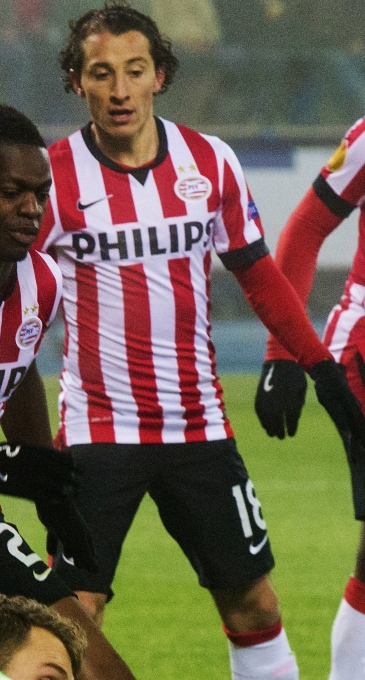
Guardado with PSV in 2015

For 2014–15, still owned by Valencia, Guardado joined PSV Eindhoven, who had previously attempted purchasing him in 2007. He made his Eredivisie debut on 31 August 2014 against Vitesse Arnhem at Philips Stadion. He managed to wear the captain's armband within his first months, won the Player of the Month award for November, and on 7 March of the following year he scored his first goal for his new club, contributing to a 3–0 away victory over Go Ahead Eagles.

On 15 March 2015, prior to the match against FC Groningen and amidst rumours of a transfer to AFC Ajax, PSV fans displayed a Mexican flag tifo and a banner in Spanish which read "Andrés Guardado, our Golden Mexican Eagle. He has to stay in PSV Eindhoven. Our house is your house, Andrés". On 27 March, PSV announced that they had reached a deal with Valencia over a permanent transfer, for an undisclosed fee and three years.

On 18 April 2015, with three matches to spare, the team won the league championship after a 4–1 win over SC Heerenveen, with Guardado playing the full 90 minutes. At the end of his first season, his impressive performances led him to be named player of the year by Dutch magazines Algemeen Dagblad and Voetbal International; his displays also led to his inclusion in that year's FIFA Ballon d'Or longlist.

At the start of the following campaign, Guardado came on as a 74th-minute substitute in the Johan Cruyff Shield match against Groningen, winning 3–0. He contributed 25 appearances to help the side successfully defend their title, finishing with nine assists as the team's second-highest provider. He played a pivotal part as they qualified to the Champions League round of 16 for the first time since the 2006–07 edition, and was also listed on Football Oranje's team of the season. On 31 July 2016, Guardado was in the starting 11 against Feyenoord, who were defeated 1–0 in the Johan Cruyff Shield. On 14 May 2017, he made his 100th competitive appearance for the club in a 4–1 victory over PEC Zwolle.

=== Real Betis ===
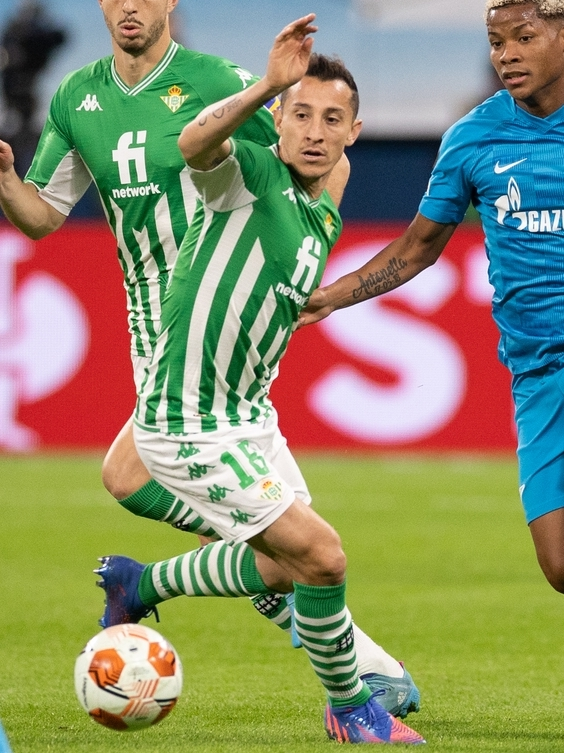
Guardado with Betis in 2022

Despite rumors linking him to a possible move to Major League Soccer clubs Atlanta United and Los Angeles FC, it was announced on 27 July 2017 that Spanish club Real Betis had signed Guardado for a reported €2.3 million on a three-year deal. The following month he was named their co-captain, and on 20 August he made his competitive debut, playing all 90 minutes in a 2–0 loss to Barcelona. He scored his first goal on 25 November, in a 2–2 home draw against Girona FC.

In December 2019, the 33-year-old Guardado renewed his contract until 2022. On 4 July 2020 he made his 100th official appearance for the Andalusians, captaining the side in their 1–1 league draw to RC Celta de Vigo and becoming the first Mexican to reach that mark for three European clubs in the process. On 11 July, he picked up a hamstring injury in a 1–0 league loss to Atlético Madrid, causing him to miss the rest of the season.

After an absence as a result of the hamstring injury, Guardado played his first match of the 2020–21 season against Valencia on 3 October, coming on as a stoppage time substitute in a 2–0 away league victory, marking it as his 14th season in Europe and becoming the Mexican with most seasons in Europe, surpassing Hugo Sánchez's record of 13. On 17 January 2021, after recovering for nearly two weeks from COVID-19, Guardado returned to the field, coming on as a second-half substitute in the Copa del Rey round of 32 match against Sporting de Gijón, winning 2–0.

On 11 January 2022, following his appearance in the league match against Rayo Vallecano, Guardado became the Mexican player with the most games in Europe with 496, surpassing the record held by Hugo Sánchez. He reached the 500 game mark on 13 February in the 4–2 victory over Levante. The following month, it was announced that the 35-year-old Guardado had extended his contract with Real Betis for one more season. On 23 April, in the Spanish Cup final against Valencia, Guardado came on as a substitute in extra time in a 1–1 draw that went into penalties, successfully converting his shot as his team won the cup.

After Joaquín retired, Guardado was named main captain of the team for the 2023–24 season. On 21 October, coming on as a substitute against Getafe FC in a 1–1 draw, he made his 208th appearance for the club, making him the club's top non-European with most appearances, surpassing that of Brazilian footballer Denílson.

=== León ===
On 18 January 2024, Guardado and Real Betis reached a mutual agreement to part ways. On that same day, Guardado signed with Liga MX club León, which marked his return to Mexico. On 27 January, he made his debut coming on as a substitute and being given the captain's armband in a 3–2 victory over Santos Laguna.

On 7 November 2024, Guardado announced his retirement from professional football. Two months later, he reversed his decision with the intention of participating in the FIFA Club World Cup. However, due to Club León's disqualification from the competition, Guardado's final match took place on 11 May 2025 in a Clausura quarter final 2–1 loss against Cruz Azul. He officially retired after the match.

== International career ==
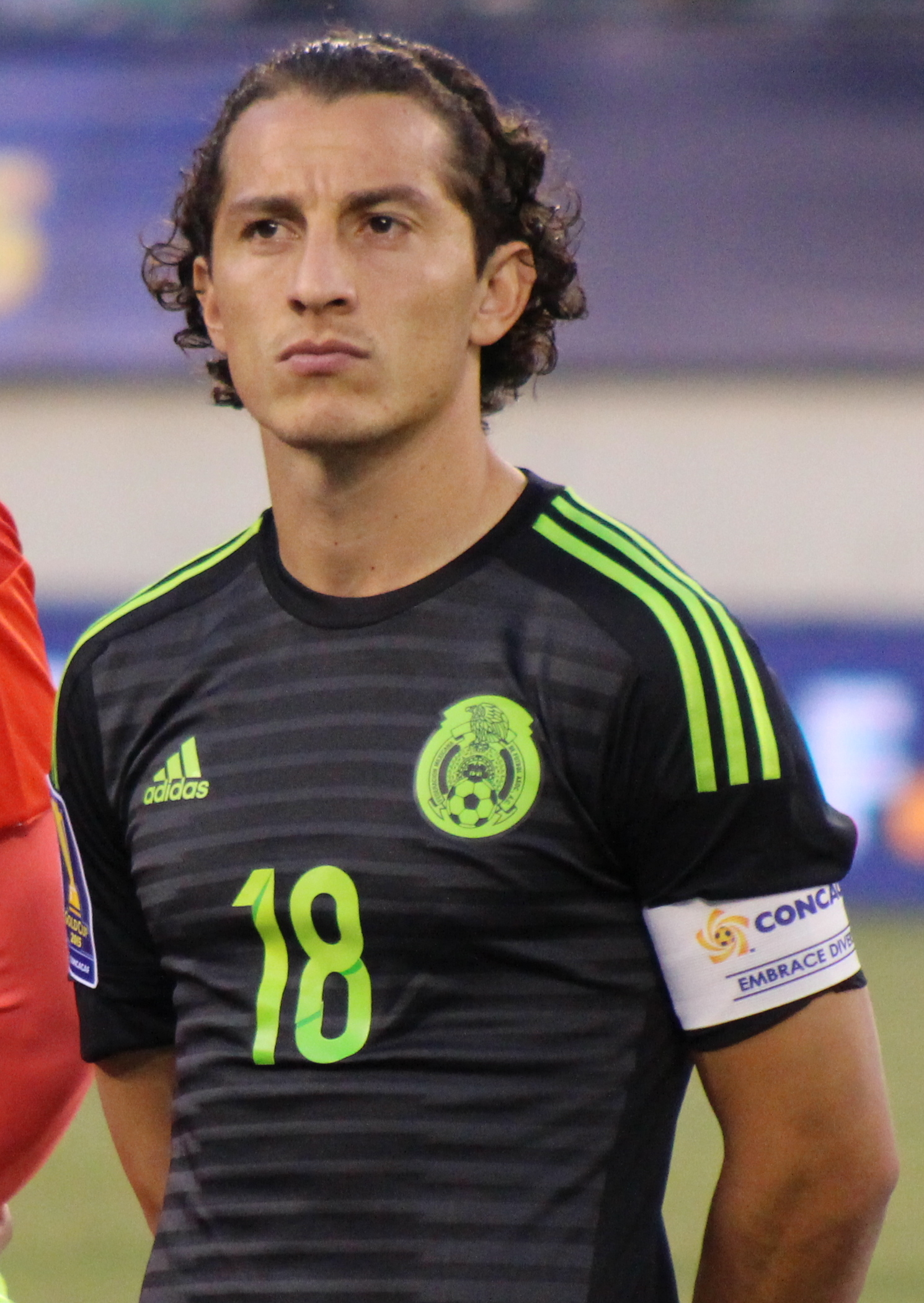
Guardado in 2015

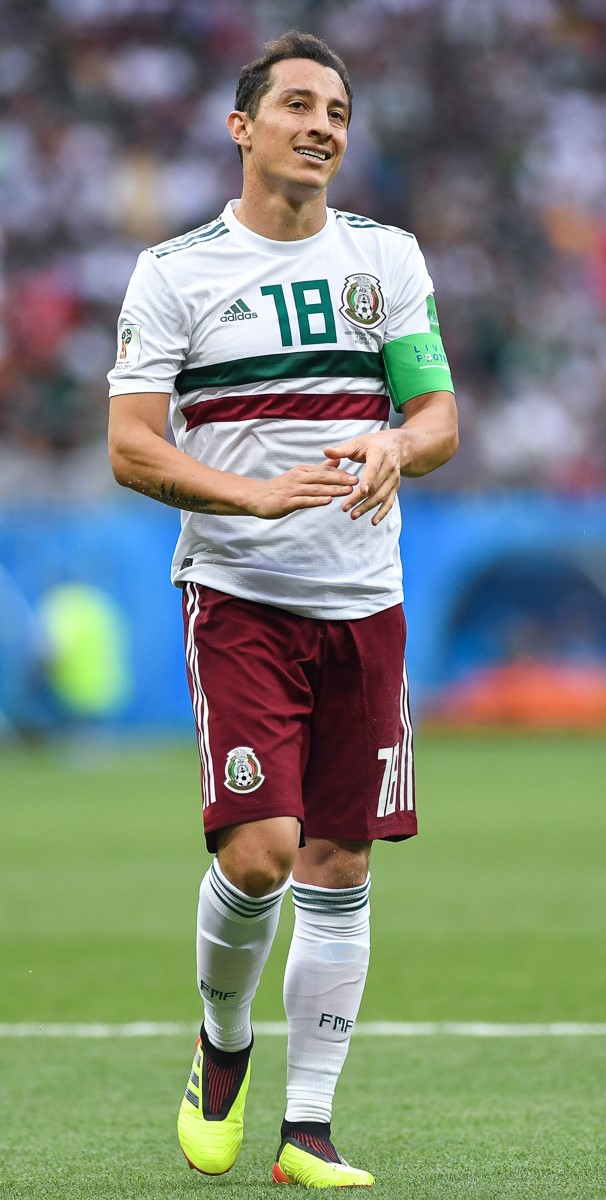
Guardado as captain for Mexico at the 2018 FIFA World Cup

Guardado made his first appearance for Mexico in a friendly match against Hungary on 14 December 2005, four months after his first-team debut with Atlas. He was then called up to represent his country at the 2006 FIFA World Cup in Germany, where he appeared in the 2–1 loss to Argentina in the round of 16, starting as a shifting attacking midfielder/wing-back alongside Ramón Morales but was replaced by Gonzalo Pineda after picking up an injury in the second half; after the departure of manager Ricardo La Volpe, his replacement Hugo Sánchez kept the player in his squad.

Guardado's first game under the new manager was an exhibition game against the United States on 7 February 2007, where he came on as a substitute in a 0–2 defeat. On 28 February, in a friendly with Venezuela, he scored his first international goal in Mexico's 3–1 victory. In the final of the 2007 CONCACAF Gold Cup, Guardado scored the opening goal against the United States. During the second half he collided head-on with Jonathan Spector while both attempted to head the ball, but recovered to play the rest of the match, which ended in a 2–1 loss; he was listed as an Honorable Mention for the competition's All-Tournament Team. He also participated in that year's Copa América, scoring the third goal against Uruguay in the third-place match.

Javier Aguirre included Guardado in the roster for the 2010 World Cup. He assisted Rafael Márquez in the opening game of the World Cup against hosts South Africa, in a 1–1 draw. An expected starter, he lacked playing time and appeared in three out of four games, in another last-16 exit at the hands of Argentina. In May 2011, Guardado was called up by José Manuel de la Torre for the 2011 Gold Cup. He scored his first brace with the national team during that tournament, in a 4–1 win over Costa Rica on 12 June. He found the net again in the final in a 4–2 victory over the United States, as Mexico retained the trophy. Guardado made the squad for the 2013 FIFA Confederations Cup in Brazil. As El Tri failed to progress from the group stage, he played all three matches.

On 5 March 2014, Guardado made his 100th appearance for Mexico in a friendly with Nigeria. Selected by Miguel Herrera for the 2014 World Cup in Brazil, he started all the games as a left midfielder, and scored in the last group phase fixture, a 3–1 win against Croatia. Mexico faced the Netherlands in the round of 16, being controversially eliminated after succumbing to a 2–1 defeat. Following the end of the tournament, Herrera declared that Guardado would captain the following September friendlies with Chile and Bolivia, in instances when actual captain Rafael Márquez was absent.

At the 2015 Gold Cup, Guardado's first tournament as captain, he scored six times en route to the title; the first being a first-half effort in a 6–0 demolition of Cuba in the group stage, the second in a 4–4 draw against Trinidad and Tobago, and his third via penalty kick in the last minute of stoppage time in the 1–0 quarter-final victory against Costa Rica. In the semi-finals with Panama, he scored twice from the penalty spot to help El Tri come from behind and win 2–1 and, in the decisive match against Jamaica, scored the opener in an eventual 3–1 victory, becoming the first player to score in three Gold Cup finals, and subsequently won the Golden Ball Award as the tournament's best player. He was also called up by then interim-manager Ricardo Ferretti for the subsequent CONCACAF Cup – a play-off match to determine CONCACAF's entry into the 2017 FIFA Confederations Cup – against the United States, which Mexico won 3–2.

Picked for the Copa América Centenario squad by Juan Carlos Osorio, Guardado provided a cross in the opening fixture against Uruguay that led to an own goal in an eventual 3–1 victory, but was also sent off for two bookable offences. He took part in a further two games, including the team's 7–0 quarter-final defeat to Chile. Guardado also made the final list for the 2017 Confederations Cup in Russia, where he appeared as captain in the group stage fixtures against Portugal and Russia, picking up a yellow card on both occasions and thus missing the semi-final match against Germany. He returned to the lineup in the third-place playoff, a 2–1 loss to Portugal.

After an injury scare that required medical intervention that was picked up while playing with Betis, Guardado was selected in the final 23-man squad for the 2018 World Cup, his first as captain. In the first match, he played 74 minutes in a 1–0 defeat of Germany, going on to take part in all the fixtures including the round of 16 loss with Brazil. Following their elimination, it was reported by Mexican sports newspaper Récord that he had played through the tournament with a muscle injury.

Guardado was called up by Gerardo Martino to participate in the 2019 Gold Cup. In the second group match against Canada, he replaced the injured Érick Gutiérrez at the 37th minute and scored twice, helping to a 3–1 win and being named Player of the match. He broke various CONCACAF-based records at the end of that stage, among them the most-capped Mexican player in the Gold Cup and the only from the country to score in four editions of the CONCACAF Gold Cup, eventually winning the competition and being included in the Best XI. In November 2022, Guardado was included in Mexico's 26-man squad for the World Cup. In a friendly match against Sweden prior to the World Cup, Guardado made his 178th appearance for Mexico as a half-time substitute, and became the most capped player in the history of the national side, surpassing Claudio Suárez. He made his only appearance in the group stage match against Argentina appearing as captain, he was brought off before the end of the first half due to a pulled muscle as Mexico lost 2–0.

On 16 May 2023, Guardado announced his retirement from the national team, and played a final match on 15 October 2024 as a farewell match against the United States on home soil, where Mexico won the match 2–0.

== Managerial career ==
On 28 August 2026, it was announced that Guardado would join Rafael Márquez's coaching staff for Mexico en route to the 2030 FIFA World Cup.

== Style of play ==
Guardado started his career as a winger at Atlas, occasionally playing as a left-back. He was mainly deployed in the former position at Deportivo by Miguel Ángel Lotina, and changed to the latter after moving to Valencia. When played as a winger, he was an incisive and quick footballer, known to play deep into the field, take on defenders one-on-one and provide accurate crosses, managing to score for both club and country.

"[H]e will surely be the best footballer I have trained and that I am going to train [...] He is a footballer with many merits. Not only in his conditions, but in what he creates. When everyone else stops, he keeps on going."

— Former Real Betis manager Quique Setién

In 2014, under Miguel Herrera's improvization, Guardado began to play as a defensive midfielder for the national team. At PSV, manager Phillip Cocu facilitated his positional change as injuries hampered his speed, as the latter began to operate as a central midfielder with box-to-box and deep-lying playmaker qualities; he later took on more defensive duties.

Described as a creative player, Guardado is known for establishing the tempo of his team. He also has good passing and dribbling skills, also being proficient at free kicks, penalties and holding up the ball. He also possesses a powerful and accurate shot from distance, and is capable of aiding his team defensively due to his work rate and stamina; additionally, he was described as playing closer to the "Iberian midfielder archetype," focused on possession in the center of the field, winning the ball back with smart positioning instead of tackles and then pushing it forward.

Guardado has cited his compatriot and national teammate Rafael Márquez as an influence in his playing style and leadership.

== Personal life ==
Guardado married fellow Guadalajara native Briana Morales in December 2006. In 2011, they divorced. He is an "honorary associate" of the Asociación Mexicana de Futbolistas (Mexican Footballers Association), created in October 2017. An association that its main goal is, according to him, to "create a dialogue with league, federation and club authorities" with the domestic footballers.

Much of Guardado's first year at Betis' Estadio Benito Villamarín was captured in the Amazon Prime television documentary series Six Dreams, in which he was one of the stars. On 1 January 2021, it was reported that Guardado tested positive for COVID-19. By 13 January, he recovered.

== Career statistics ==
=== Club ===
Appearances and goals by club, season and competition
| Club | Season | League | | | Cup (Note: Includes Copa del Rey, DFB-Pokal and KNVB Cup) | | Continental | | Other | | Total | |
| Club | Season | Division | Apps | Goals | Apps | Goals | Apps | Goals | Apps | Goals | Apps | Goals |
|---|---|---|---|---|---|---|---|---|---|---|---|---|
| Atlas | 2005–06 | Mexican Primera División | 26 | 1 | — | | — | | — | | 26 | 1 |
| Atlas | 2006–07 | Mexican Primera División | 38 | 5 | — | | — | | — | | 38 | 5 |
| Atlas | Total | | 64 | 6 | — | | — | | — | | 64 | 6 |
| Deportivo La Coruña | 2007–08 | La Liga | 26 | 5 | 1 | 0 | — | | — | | 27 | 5 |
| Deportivo La Coruña | 2008–09 | La Liga | 29 | 2 | 1 | 0 | 8 (Note: Appearances in UEFA Europa League) | 1 | — | | 38 | 3 |
| Deportivo La Coruña | 2009–10 | La Liga | 26 | 3 | 1 | 1 | — | | — | | 27 | 4 |
| Deportivo La Coruña | 2010–11 | La Liga | 20 | 2 | — | | — | | — | | 20 | 2 |
| Deportivo La Coruña | 2011–12 | Segunda División | 36 | 11 | 1 | 0 | — | | — | | 37 | 11 |
| Deportivo La Coruña | Total | | 137 | 23 | 4 | 1 | 8 | 1 | — | | 149 | 25 |
| Valencia | 2012–13 | La Liga | 32 | 1 | 5 | 0 | 7 (Note: Appearances in UEFA Champions League) | 0 | — | | 44 | 1 |
| Valencia | 2013–14 | La Liga | 16 | 0 | 3 | 0 | 3 | 0 | — | | 22 | 0 |
| Valencia | Total | | 48 | 1 | 8 | 0 | 10 | 0 | — | | 66 | 1 |
| Bayer Leverkusen (loan) | 2013–14 | Bundesliga | 4 | 0 | 1 | 0 | 2 | 0 | — | | 7 | 0 |
| PSV (loan) | 2014–15 | Eredivisie | 28 | 1 | 1 | 0 | 6 | 0 | — | | 35 | 1 |
| PSV | 2015–16 | Eredivisie | 25 | 1 | 1 | 0 | 7 | 0 | 1 (Note: Appearance in Johan Cruyff Shield) | 0 | 34 | 1 |
| PSV | 2016–17 | Eredivisie | 27 | 2 | 1 | 0 | 4 | 0 | 1 | 0 | 33 | 2 |
| PSV | Total | | 52 | 3 | 2 | 0 | 11 | 0 | 2 | 0 | 67 | 3 |
| Betis | 2017–18 | La Liga | 29 | 2 | 1 | 0 | — | | — | | 30 | 2 |
| Betis | 2018–19 | La Liga | 31 | 0 | 6 | 0 | 5 | 0 | — | | 42 | 0 |
| Betis | 2019–20 | La Liga | 28 | 0 | 2 | 0 | — | | — | | 30 | 0 |
| Betis | 2020–21 | La Liga | 24 | 1 | 3 | 0 | — | | — | | 27 | 1 |
| Betis | 2021–22 | La Liga | 28 | 0 | 3 | 0 | 5 | 1 | — | | 36 | 1 |
| Betis | 2022–23 | La Liga | 26 | 1 | — | | 7 | 0 | 1 (Note: Appearance in Supercopa de España) | 0 | 34 | 1 |
| Betis | 2023–24 | La Liga | 12 | 0 | 2 | 0 | 5 | 0 | — | | 19 | 0 |
| Betis | Total | | 178 | 4 | 17 | 0 | 22 | 1 | 1 | 0 | 218 | 5 |
| León | 2023–24 | Liga MX | 9 | 0 | — | | — | | — | | 9 | 0 |
| León | 2024–25 | Liga MX | 25 | 2 | — | | — | | — | | 25 | 2 |
| León | Total | | 34 | 2 | — | | — | | — | | 34 | 2 |
| Career total | | | 545 | 40 | 33 | 1 | 59 | 2 | 3 | 0 | 640 | 43 |

=== International ===
Appearances and goals by national team and year
| National team | Year | Apps | Goals |
|---|---|---|---|
| Mexico | 2005 | 1 | 0 |
| Mexico | 2006 | 6 | 0 |
| Mexico | 2007 | 22 | 4 |
| Mexico | 2008 | 10 | 3 |
| Mexico | 2009 | 9 | 1 |
| Mexico | 2010 | 15 | 1 |
| Mexico | 2011 | 15 | 5 |
| Mexico | 2012 | 10 | 1 |
| Mexico | 2013 | 12 | 0 |
| Mexico | 2014 | 12 | 1 |
| Mexico | 2015 | 13 | 7 |
| Mexico | 2016 | 10 | 2 |
| Mexico | 2017 | 10 | 1 |
| Mexico | 2018 | 7 | 0 |
| Mexico | 2019 | 10 | 3 |
| Mexico | 2020 | 2 | 0 |
| Mexico | 2021 | 9 | 0 |
| Mexico | 2022 | 8 | 0 |
| Mexico | 2024 | 1 | 0 |
| Total | | 182 | 29 |

Scores and results list Mexico's goal tally first, score column indicates score after each Guardado goal.

List of international goals scored by Andrés Guardado
| No. | Date | Venue | Opponent | Score | Result | Competition |
|---|---|---|---|---|---|---|
| 1 | 27 February 2007 | Qualcomm Stadium, San Diego, United States | Venezuela | 1–0 | 3–1 | Friendly |
| 2 | 24 June 2007 | Soldier Field, Chicago, United States | United States | 1–0 | 1–2 | 2007 CONCACAF Gold Cup |
| 3 | 14 July 2007 | Estadio Olímpico, Caracas, Venezuela | Uruguay | 3–1 | 3–1 | 2007 Copa América |
| 4 | 8 June 2008 | Soldier Field, Chicago, United States | Peru | 2–0 | 4–0 | Friendly |
| 5 | 21 June 2008 | Estadio Universitario, San Nicolás de los Garza, Mexico | Belize | 2–0 | 7–0 | 2010 FIFA World Cup qualification |
| 6 | 6 September 2008 | Estadio Azteca, Mexico City, Mexico | Jamaica | 2–0 | 3–0 | 2010 FIFA World Cup qualification |
| 7 | 5 September 2009 | Estadio Ricardo Saprissa Aymá, San José, Costa Rica | Costa Rica | 3–0 | 3–0 | 2010 FIFA World Cup qualification |
| 8 | 13 May 2010 | Reliant Stadium, Houston, United States | Angola | 1–0 | 1–0 | Friendly |
| 9 | 26 March 2011 | Oakland–Alameda County Coliseum, Oakland, United States | Paraguay | 2–0 | 3–1 | Friendly |
| 10 | 12 June 2011 | Soldier Field, Chicago, United States | Costa Rica | 2–0 | 4–1 | 2011 CONCACAF Gold Cup |
| 11 | 12 June 2011 | Soldier Field, Chicago, United States | Costa Rica | 3–0 | 4–1 | 2011 CONCACAF Gold Cup |
| 12 | 25 June 2011 | Rose Bowl, Pasadena, United States | United States | 2–2 | 4–2 | 2011 CONCACAF Gold Cup |
| 13 | 4 September 2011 | Estadi Cornellà-El Prat, Cornellà de Llobregat, Spain | Chile | 1–0 | 1–0 | Friendly |
| 14 | 12 October 2012 | BBVA Compass Stadium, Houston, United States | Guyana | 1–0 | 5–0 | 2014 FIFA World Cup qualification |
| 15 | 23 June 2014 | Arena Pernambuco, São Lourenço da Mata, Brazil | Croatia | 2–0 | 3–1 | 2014 FIFA World Cup |
| 16 | 9 July 2015 | Soldier Field, Chicago, United States | Cuba | 4–0 | 6–0 | 2015 CONCACAF Gold Cup |
| 17 | 15 July 2015 | Bank of America Stadium, Charlotte, United States | Trinidad and Tobago | 3–3 | 4–4 | 2015 CONCACAF Gold Cup |
| 18 | 19 July 2015 | MetLife Stadium, East Rutherford, United States | Costa Rica | 1–0 | 1–0 | 2015 CONCACAF Gold Cup |
| 19 | 22 July 2015 | Georgia Dome, Atlanta, United States | Panama | 1–1 | 2–1 | 2015 CONCACAF Gold Cup |
| 20 | 22 July 2015 | Georgia Dome, Atlanta, United States | Panama | 2–1 | 2–1 | 2015 CONCACAF Gold Cup |
| 21 | 26 July 2015 | Lincoln Financial Field, Philadelphia, United States | Jamaica | 1–0 | 3–1 | 2015 CONCACAF Gold Cup |
| 22 | 13 November 2015 | Estadio Azteca, Mexico City, Mexico | El Salvador | 1–0 | 3–0 | 2018 FIFA World Cup qualification |
| 23 | 29 March 2016 | Estadio Azteca, Mexico City, Mexico | Canada | 1–0 | 2–0 | 2018 FIFA World Cup qualification |
| 24 | 28 May 2016 | Georgia Dome, Atlanta, United States | Paraguay | 1–0 | 1–0 | Friendly |
| 25 | 10 November 2017 | King Baudouin Stadium, Brussels, Belgium | Belgium | 1–1 | 3–3 | Friendly |
| 26 | 5 June 2019 | Mercedes-Benz Stadium, Atlanta, United States | Venezuela | 3–1 | 3–1 | Friendly |
| 27 | 19 June 2019 | Broncos Stadium at Mile High, Denver, United States | Canada | 2–0 | 3–1 | 2019 CONCACAF Gold Cup |
| 28 | 19 June 2019 | Broncos Stadium at Mile High, Denver, United States | Canada | 3–1 | 3–1 | 2019 CONCACAF Gold Cup |

== Honours ==
Deportivo La Coruña

- Segunda División: 2011–12
- UEFA Intertoto Cup: 2008

PSV

- Eredivisie: 2014–15, 2015–16
- Johan Cruyff Shield: 2015, 2016

Betis

- Copa del Rey: 2021–22

Mexico

- CONCACAF Gold Cup: 2011, 2015, 2019
- CONCACAF Cup: 2015

Individual

- Mexican Primera División Best Rookie: Apertura 2005
- Mexican Primera División Best Full-back: Apertura 2006, Clausura 2007
- Deportivo de La Coruña Fan's Player of the Year: 2008, 2011
- Deportivo de La Coruña Fan's Player of the Season: 2007–08, 2011–12
- Tecate Premios Deportes Best Offensive Midfielder: 2009
- Tecate Premios Deportes Best XI: 2009
- CONCACAF Gold Cup top assist provider: 2011 (shared)
- Segunda División Best Attacking Midfielder: 2011–12
- Eredivisie Player of the Month: November 2014
- AD Eredivisie Player of the Year: 2014–15
- VI Eredivisie Player of the Year: 2014–15
- AD Eredivisie Best XI: 2015–16
- Football Oranje Team of the Season: 2015–16
- CONCACAF Best XI: 2015, 2016, 2018
- CONCACAF Gold Cup Golden Ball: 2015
- CONCACAF Gold Cup Best XI: 2019; Honorable Mention: 2007
- CONCACAF Gold Cup Best Goal: 2011 (third place)
- IFFHS CONCACAF Men's Team of the Decade: 2011–2020
- IFFHS CONCACAF Men's All Time Dream Team
- Liga MX All-Star: 2024

Records

- Most caps for Mexico: 180

== See also ==
- List of men's footballers with 100 or more international caps
