= Rodri (footballer, born 2000) =

Spanish footballer

Personal information
- Full name: Rodrigo Sánchez Rodríguez
- Date of birth: 16 May 2000 (age 26)
- Place of birth: Talayuela, Spain
- Height: 1.68 m (5 ft 6 in)
- Position: Attacking midfielder

Team information
- Current team: Al-Arabi
- Number: 10

Youth career
- Talayuela
- Navalmoral
- 2011–2012: Real Madrid
- 2011–2012: → Canillas (loan)
- 2012–2013: Atlético Madrid
- 2013–2014: Espanyol
- 2014–2015: Barcelona
- 2015–2016: Deportivo La Coruña
- 2016–2018: Betis

Senior career*
Years	Team	Apps	(Gls)
2018–2021	Betis B	71	(9)
2020–2024	Betis	98	(3)
2024–	Al-Arabi	32	(9)

International career^{‡}
2021–2023	Spain U21	18	(3)
Medal record
Representing Spain
UEFA European Under-21 Championship
Runner-up	2023 Georgia–Romania
- * Club domestic league appearances and goals as of 17 January 2026 ‡ National team caps and goals as of 8 July 2023

Rodrigo Sánchez Rodríguez (born 16 May 2000), commonly known as Rodri ([ˈroðɾi]), is a Spanish professional footballer who plays for Qatar Stars League club Al-Arabi. Mainly an attacking midfielder, he can also play as a winger.

== Club career ==
Born in Talayuela, Cáceres, Extremadura, Rodri started his career with CP Talayuela, and subsequently represented EF Navalmoral before joining Real Madrid's La Fábrica in 2011. After spending the pre-season with the side, he was loaned to CD Canillas for a year before joining Atlético Madrid in 2012.

In June 2014, after a one-year spell at RCD Espanyol, Rodri joined FC Barcelona's La Masia. After leaving Barça in 2015, he then spent a year at Deportivo de La Coruña before joining Real Betis' youth setup in 2016.

Rodri made his senior debut with the reserves on 26 August 2018, coming on as a second-half substitute in a 3–0 Tercera División home win against Conil CF. He scored his first senior goal on 7 October, netting the third in a 8–0 home routing of CD Gerena, and renewed his contract until 2022 the following 27 March.

Rodri made his first team – and La Liga – debut on 7 November 2020, replacing Sergio Canales late into a 5–2 away loss against his former club Barcelona.

On 8 September 2024, Rodri joined Qatar Stars League club Al-Arabi.

== Career statistics ==
=== Club ===
As of match played 1 September 2024

Appearances and goals by club, season and competition
Club	Season	League			National cup		Continental		Other		Total	
Club	Season	Division	Apps	Goals	Apps	Goals	Apps	Goals	Apps	Goals	Apps	Goals
Betis B	2018–19	Tercera División	35	3	—		—		—		35	3
Betis B	2019–20	Tercera División	27	5	—		—		2 (Note: Appearance(s) in Tercera División promotion play-offs)	1	29	6
Betis B	2020–21	Segunda División B	9	1	—		—		—		9	1
Betis B	Total		71	9	—		—		2	1	73	10
Betis	2020–21	La Liga	15	0	4	1	0	0	—		19	1
Betis	2021–22	La Liga	21	1	4	0	3 (Note: Appearances in UEFA Europa League)	0	—		28	1
Betis	2022–23	La Liga	30	2	2	0	6	0	1 (Note: Appearance in Supercopa de España)	0	39	2
Betis	2023–24	La Liga	29	0	2	3	5 (Note: Three appearances in UEFA Europa League, two appearances in UEFA Europa Conference League)	0	—		36	3
Betis	2024–25	La Liga	3	0	—		2 (Note: Appearances in UEFA Conference League)	1	—		5	1
Betis	Total		98	3	12	4	16	1	1	0	127	8
Career total			169	12	12	4	16	1	3	1	200	18

== Honours ==
Betis

- Copa del Rey: 2021–22

Individual

- UEFA European Under-21 Championship Team of the Tournament: 2023
