= 2023–24 Real Betis season =

Real Betis
2023–24 season
- President: Ángel Haro
- Head coach: Manuel Pellegrini
- Stadium: Benito Villamarín
- La Liga: 7th
- Copa del Rey: Round of 32
- UEFA Europa League: Group stage
- UEFA Europa Conference League: Knockout round play-offs
- Top goalscorer: League: Willian José (10); All: Willian José (14)
Home colours	Away colours	Third colours

The 2023–24 season was Real Betis' 117th season in existence and ninth consecutive season in La Liga. They also competed in the Copa del Rey, the UEFA Europa League and the UEFA Europa Conference League. The season began on 13 August 2023.

Betis were eliminated from the Copa del Rey by Alavés in the round of 32 and exited the Europa League in the group stage after ranking third; after dropping down to the Europa Conference League, they were eliminated at the first attempt by Dinamo Zagreb, in the knockout round play-offs.

This season was the first since 2014–15 without veteran midfielder Joaquín, who annonounced his retirement following the previous campaign's conclusion.

== Players ==
=== First-team squad ===
As of 22 May 2024

Note: Flags indicate national team as defined under FIFA eligibility rules; some limited exceptions apply. Players may hold more than one non-FIFA nationality.

No.	Pos.	Nation	Player
1	GK	CHI	Claudio Bravo
2	DF	ESP	Héctor Bellerín
3	DF	ESP	Juan Miranda
4	MF	USA	Johnny Cardoso
5	MF	ARG	Guido Rodríguez
6	DF	ARG	Germán Pezzella (vice-captain)
7	FW	MAR	Abde Ezzalzouli
8	MF	FRA	Nabil Fekir (captain)
9	FW	ARG	Chimy Ávila
10	FW	ESP	Ayoze Pérez
11	FW	COD	Cédric Bakambu
12	FW	BRA	Willian José
13	GK	POR	Rui Silva

No.	Pos.	Nation	Player
14	MF	POR	William Carvalho
15	DF	ESP	Marc Bartra
17	MF	ESP	Rodri Sánchez
18	MF	ESP	Pablo Fornals
20	DF	BRA	Abner
21	MF	ESP	Marc Roca (on loan from Leeds United)
22	MF	ESP	Isco
23	DF	SEN	Youssouf Sabaly
24	DF	ESP	Aitor Ruibal
27	MF	ESP	Sergi Altimira
28	DF	MAR	Chadi Riad
38	MF	ESP	Assane Diao

=== Reserve team ===
Note: Flags indicate national team as defined under FIFA eligibility rules; some limited exceptions apply. Players may hold more than one non-FIFA nationality.

No.	Pos.	Nation	Player
30	GK	ESP	Fran Vieites
31	GK	POR	Guilherme Fernandes (on loan from Estrela Amadora)
32	DF	SEN	Nobel Mendy (on loan from Paris FC)
33	DF	ESP	Xavi Pleguezuelo
34	DF	ESP	Ricardo Visus

No.	Pos.	Nation	Player
37	MF	ESP	Dani Pérez
39	MF	ESP	Ginés Sorroche
40	MF	ESP	Quique Fernández
42	DF	ESP	Pablo Busto
50	GK	ESP	Germán García

=== Out on loan ===
Note: Flags indicate national team as defined under FIFA eligibility rules; some limited exceptions apply. Players may hold more than one non-FIFA nationality.

No.	Pos.	Nation	Player
—	DF	ESP	Félix Garreta (at Amorebieta until 30 June 2024)
—	DF	ESP	Ismael Sierra (at Teruel until 30 June 2024)
—	MF	ESP	Álex Collado (at Al-Okhdood until 30 June 2024)
—	FW	ESP	Borja Iglesias (at Bayer Leverkusen until 30 June 2024)

No.	Pos.	Nation	Player
—	FW	ESP	Juan Cruz (at Leganés until 30 June 2024)
—	FW	ESP	Juanmi (at Cádiz until 30 June 2024)
—	FW	ESP	Rober González (at NEC Nijmegen until 30 June 2024)

== Transfers ==
=== In ===
Pos.	Player	Transferred from	Fee	Date	Source
FW	(Spain) Ayoze Pérez	(England) Leicester City	Free	6 July 2023	
MF	(Spain) Marc Roca	(England) Leeds United	Loan	17 July 2023	
DF	(Spain) Héctor Bellerín	(Portugal) Sporting CP	Free	18 July 2023	
DF	(Spain) Marc Bartra	Unattached	Free	24 July 2023	
MF	(Spain) Isco	Unattached	Free	26 July 2023	
DF	(Morocco) Chadi Riad	(Spain) Barcelona	Loan	27 July 2023	
MF	(Spain) Álex Collado	(Spain) Barcelona	Free	27 July 2023	
MF	(Spain) Sergi Altimira	(Spain) Getafe	€2,000,000	11 August 2023	
FW	(Morocco) Abde Ezzalzouli	(Spain) Barcelona	€7,500,000	1 September 2023	
DF	(Greece) Sokratis Papastathopoulos	Unattached	Free	26 October 2023	
MF	(United States) Johnny Cardoso	(Brazil) Internacional	€6,300,000	1 January 2024	
FW	(Argentina) Ezequiel Ávila	(Spain) Osasuna	€4,000,000	1 February 2024	
MF	(Spain) Pablo Fornals	(England) West Ham United	€8,000,000	1 February 2024	
FW	(Democratic Republic of the Congo) Cédric Bakambu	(Turkey) Galatasaray	€5,000,000	1 February 2024	

=== Out ===
Pos.	Player	Transferred to	Fee	Date	Source
DF	(Spain) Víctor Ruiz	Released		1 July 2023	
MF	(Spain) Joaquín	Retired		1 July 2023	
DF	(Spain) Edgar González	(Spain) Almería	€4,500,000	6 July 2023	
MF	(Spain) Rober González	(Netherlands) NEC Nijmegen	Loan	14 July 2023	
GK	(Spain) Dani Martín	Andorra	Free	15 July 2023	
FW	(Spain) Loren Morón	Released		19 July 2023	
MF	(Spain) Sergio Canales	(Mexico) Monterrey	€10,000,000	24 July 2023	
MF	(Mexico) Diego Lainez	(Mexico) UANL	€6,000,000	26 July 2023	
MF	(Spain) Álex Collado	(Saudi Arabia) Al-Okhdood	Loan	1 August 2023	
DF	(Spain) Martin Montoya	Released		8 August 2023	
FW	(Spain) Raúl García	(Spain) Osasuna	€6,500,000	10 August 2023	
MF	(Spain) Juanmi	(Saudi Arabia) Al-Riyadh	Loan + €1,000,000	19 August 2023	
MF	(Ivory Coast) Paul Akouokou	(France) Lyon	€3,000,000	1 September 2023	
DF	(Italy) Luiz Felipe	(Saudi Arabia) Al-Ittihad	€22,000,000	7 September 2023	
MF	(Mexico) Andrés Guardado	(Mexico) León	Free	18 January 2024	
FW	(Spain) Borja Iglesias	(Germany) Bayer Leverkusen	Loan	27 January 2024	
MF	(Spain) Juanmi	(Spain) Cádiz	Loan	1 February 2024	
FW	(Spain) Juan Cruz	(Spain) Leganés	Loan	1 February 2024	
MF	(Brazil) Luiz Henrique	(Brazil) Botafogo	€16,000,000	1 February 2024	

=== New contracts ===
Position	Player	Date	Until	Ref.
GK	(Chile) Claudio Bravo	19 June 2023	June 2024	
MF	(Mexico) Andrés Guardado	21 June 2023	June 2024	
MF	(Spain) Isco	28 December 2023	June 2027	
DF	(Argentina) Germán Pezzella	12 February 2024	June 2026	
GK	(Spain) Fran Vieites	19 February 2024	June 2026	
DF	(Spain) Marc Bartra	3 June 2024	June 2025	

== Pre-season and friendlies ==
Win Draw Loss

15 July 2023 Friendly	Eintracht Braunschweig	3–1	Real Betis	Braunschweig, Germany
12:30 CEST (UTC+2)	Endo 20'; Donkor 34'; Gomez 35'; Griesbeck (yellow card) 38'	Report	Luiz Felipe (yellow card) 45+1'; Sierra (yellow card) 57'; Willian José 68' (pen.); Fernández (yellow card) 75'	Stadium: Eintracht-Stadion

19 July 2023 Friendly	Real Betis	1–3	Monaco	Burton upon Trent, England
19:00 BST (UTC+1)	Luiz Felipe 81'	Report	Volland 56', 66'; Minamino 76'	Stadium: St George's Park National Football Centre

22 July 2023 Friendly	Middlesbrough	0–1	Real Betis	Chesterfield, England
14:00 BST (UTC+1)		Report	Pérez 63'	Stadium: SMH Group Stadium

28 July 2023 Friendly	Real Betis	1–1	Burnley	Huelva
19:30 CEST (UTC+2)	Bartra 51'	Report	Beyer 27'	Stadium: Nuevo Colombino

3 August 2023 La Liga Summer Tour	Sevilla	1–0	Real Betis	Zapopan, Mexico
21:00 CST (UTC−6)	Gómez (yellow card) 27'; Montiel (yellow card) 34'; Fernando (yellow card) 40'; En-Nesyri 90+2'	Report	Pezzella (yellow card) 32'; Bellerín (yellow card) 78'	Stadium: Estadio Akron; Referee: Víctor Alfonso Cáceres Hernández (Mexico)

5 August 2023 La Liga Summer Tour	Real Betis	0–1	Real Sociedad	San Francisco, United States
20:00 PDT (UTC−7)	Miranda (yellow card) 35'; Guardado (yellow card) 45'; Roca (yellow card) 63'	Report	Muñoz 69'; Oyarzabal (yellow card) 89'	Stadium: Oracle Park

== Competitions ==
=== Overall record ===
Competition	First match	Last match	Starting round	Final position	Record							
Competition	First match	Last match	Starting round	Final position	Pld	W	D	L	GF	GA	GD	Win %
La Liga	13 August 2023	25 May 2024	Matchday 1	7th	38	14	15	9	48	45	+3	36.84
Copa del Rey	1 November 2023	6 January 2024	First round	Round of 32	3	2	0	1	14	3	+11	66.67
UEFA Europa League	21 September 2023	14 December 2023	Group stage	Group stage	6	3	0	3	9	7	+2	50.00
UEFA Europa Conference League	15 February 2024	22 February 2024	Knockout round play-offs	Knockout round play-offs	2	0	1	1	1	2	−1	0.00
Total					49	19	16	14	72	57	+15	38.78

Source: Soccerway

=== La Liga ===
==== League table ====
Pos	Team	Pld	W	D	L	GF	GA	GD	Pts	Qualification or relegation
5	Athletic Bilbao	38	19	11	8	61	37	+24	68	Qualification for the Europa League league phase (Note: Since the winners of the 2023–24 Copa del Rey, Athletic Bilbao, qualified for European competition based on league position, the Europa League berth awarded to the Copa del Rey winners was passed to the sixth-placed team, and the Conference League berth awarded to the sixth-placed team was passed to the seventh-placed team.)
6	Real Sociedad	38	16	12	10	51	39	+12	60	Qualification for the Europa League league phase
7	Real Betis	38	14	15	9	48	45	+3	57	Qualification for the Conference League play-off round
8	Villarreal	38	14	11	13	65	65	0	53	
9	Valencia	38	13	10	15	40	45	−5	49	

Source: LaLiga EA Sports
Rules for classification: 1) Points; 2) Head-to-head points; 3) Head-to-head goal difference; 4) Goal difference; 5) Goals scored; 6) Fair-play points
(Note: Head-to-head record is used only after all the matches between the teams in question have been played)

==== Results summary ====
Overall								Home						Away					
Pld	W	D	L	GF	GA	GD	Pts	W	D	L	GF	GA	GD	W	D	L	GF	GA	GD
38	14	15	9	48	45	+3	57	9	7	3	27	19	+8	5	8	6	21	26	−5

Source: La Liga

==== Results by round ====
Round	1	2	3	4	5	6	7	8	9	10	11	12	13	14	15	16	17	18	19	20	21	22	23	24	25	26	27	28	29	30	31	32	33	34	35	36	37	38
Ground	A	H	A	H	A	H	A	H	A	A	H	H	A	H	A	H	A	H	A	H	H	A	H	A	H	H	A	H	A	A	H	A	H	A	H	A	H	A
Result	W	D	L	W	L	D	D	W	D	D	W	W	D	W	D	D	D	D	L	W	L	W	D	W	D	W	L	L	L	L	W	W	D	W	W	D	L	D
Position	6	7	9	7	10	10	10	7	8	9	7	6	7	7	7	7	7	7	7	7	9	7	8	6	7	6	6	7	7	7	8	7	7	7	6	7	7	7

Source: La Liga
A = Away; H = Home; W = Win; D = Draw; L = Loss

==== Matches ====
The league fixtures were unveiled on 22 June 2023.

13 August 2023 1	Villarreal	1–2	Real Betis	Villarreal
19:30 CEST (UTC+2)	Cuenca 61'; Mandi (yellow card) 70'	Report	Pérez 20'; Iglesias (yellow card) 27'; Luiz Felipe (yellow card) 60'; Rodríguez (yellow card) 88'; Willian José 90+5'	Stadium: Estadio de la Cerámica; Attendance: 17,825; Referee: Miguel Ángel Ortiz Arias

20 August 2023 2	Real Betis	0–0	Atlético Madrid	Seville
21:30 CEST (UTC+2)	Ruibal (yellow card) 38'; Isco (yellow card) 51'	Report	Savić (yellow card) 43'	Stadium: Benito Villamarín; Attendance: 51,782; Referee: Ricardo de Burgos Bengoetxea

27 August 2023 3	Athletic Bilbao	4–2	Real Betis	Bilbao
21:30 CEST (UTC+2)	Vesga 30' (pen.), 45' (pen.), (yellow card) 79'; Guruzeta 45+7'; Paredes (yellow card) 59'; Ruiz de Galarreta (yellow card) 61'; Gómez 84'; Berenguer (yellow card) 90+1'	Report	Willian José 2'; Isco 10'; Rodríguez (yellow card) 44'; Abner (yellow card) 48'	Stadium: San Mamés; Attendance: 44,340; Referee: César Soto Grado

2 September 2023 4	Real Betis	1–0	Rayo Vallecano	Seville
21:00 CEST (UTC+2)	Miranda (yellow card) 15'; Rodríguez (yellow card) 43'; Willian José 53'; Roca (yellow card) 85'	Report	García (yellow card) 45'; Espino (yellow card) 55'; De Tomás (yellow card) 58'; Palazón (yellow card) 58'; Pérez (yellow card) 86'	Stadium: Benito Villamarín; Attendance: 50,169; Referee: Alejandro Muñiz Ruiz

16 September 2023 5	Barcelona	5–0	Real Betis	Barcelona
21:00 CEST (UTC+2)	Félix 25'; Lewandowski 32'; Torres 62'; Raphinha 66'; Cancelo 81'; Martínez (yellow card) 86'	Report	Bartra (yellow card) 72'; Rodríguez (yellow card) 84'	Stadium: Estadi Olímpic Lluís Companys; Attendance: 45,055; Referee: José María Sánchez Martínez

24 September 2023 6	Real Betis	1–1	Cádiz	Seville
18:30 CEST (UTC+2)	Miranda (yellow card) 45'; Rodríguez 60'; Isco (yellow card) 90+6'	Report	Alejo (yellow card) 38'; Ramos 41'; Alcaraz (yellow card) 57'; Sobrino (yellow card) 90+6'	Stadium: Benito Villamarín; Attendance: 56,087; Referee: Miguel Ángel Ortiz Arias

28 September 2023 7	Granada	1–1	Real Betis	Granada
19:00 CEST (UTC+2)	Gumbau (yellow card) 3'; Boyé 67'; Miquel (yellow card) 74'	Report	Diao 51'; Ruibal (yellow card) 88'	Stadium: Nuevo Los Cármenes; Attendance: 18,936; Referee: Víctor García Verdura

1 October 2023 8	Real Betis	3–0	Valencia	Seville
21:00 CEST (UTC+2)	Pérez (yellow card) 11'; Diao 41'; Roca 52'; Ezzalzouli 85'; Pezzella (yellow card) 90'	Report	Özkacar (yellow card) 40'; Gabriel (yellow card) 43'	Stadium: Benito Villamarín; Attendance: 50,163; Referee: Ricardo de Burgos Bengoetxea

8 October 2023 9	Alavés	1–1	Real Betis	Vitoria-Gasteiz
18:30 CEST (UTC+2)	Rioja (yellow card) 32'; Bellerín 35' (o.g.); Omorodion (yellow card) 83'; Sedlar (yellow card) 90+3'	Report	Pérez 32'; Rodríguez (yellow card) 34'; Abner (yellow card) 71'; Isco (yellow card) 89'; Willian José (red card) 90+3'	Stadium: Mendizorrotza; Attendance: 18,288; Referee: Alejandro Hernández Hernández

21 October 2023 10	Getafe	1–1	Real Betis	Getafe
16:15 CEST (UTC+2)	Mayoral 17'; Rico (yellow card) 38'; Arambarri (yellow card) 38'; Álvarez (yellow card) 43'; Carmona (yellow card) 86'; Maksimović (yellow card) 89'	Report	Roca 1'; Guardado (yellow card) 34'; Pezzella (yellow card) 41'	Stadium: Coliseum; Attendance: 13,926; Referee: César Soto Grado

29 October 2023 11	Real Betis	2–1	Osasuna	Seville
14:00 CET (UTC+1)	Willian José 45+1'; Luiz Henrique (yellow card) 71'; Isco (yellow card) 76', (goal) 90+4'; Diao (yellow card) 90+2'	Report	D. García (yellow card) 54'; Gómez (yellow card) 80'; Catena (yellow card) 81'; Ru. García 85'; Herrera (yellow card) 90+2'	Stadium: Benito Villamarín; Attendance: 49,123; Referee: José María Sánchez Martínez

4 November 2023 12	Real Betis	2–0	Mallorca	Seville
16:15 CET (UTC+1)	Pezzella (yellow card) 1'; Willian José 7'; Pérez 65'	Report	Valjent (yellow card) 16'; Mascarell (yellow card) 26' (yellow-red card) 45'; Larin (yellow card) 35'	Stadium: Benito Villamarín; Attendance: 50,909; Referee: Miguel Ángel Ortiz Arias

12 November 2023 13	Sevilla	1–1	Real Betis	Seville
18:30 CET (UTC+1)	Gudelj (yellow card) 27'; Rakitić 79'	Report	Miranda (yellow card) 42'; Pérez 72'	Stadium: Ramón Sánchez Pizjuán; Attendance: 42,222; Referee: Jesús Gil Manzano

26 November 2023 14	Real Betis	1–0	Las Palmas	Seville
21:00 CET (UTC+1)	Willian José 19'; Iglesias (yellow card) 90+6'	Report	Perrone (yellow card) 33'; Munir (yellow card) 53'	Stadium: Benito Villamarín; Attendance: 48,142; Referee: Victor García Verdura

3 December 2023 15	Almería	0–0	Real Betis	Almería
16:15 CET (UTC+1)		Report	Bellerín (red card) 27'; Roca (yellow card) 52'; Diao (yellow card) 74'; Silva (yellow card) 83'	Stadium: Power Horse Stadium; Attendance: 14,253; Referee: Alejandro Muñiz Ruiz

9 December 2023 16	Real Betis	1–1	Real Madrid	Seville
16:15 CET (UTC+1)	Ruibal 66', (yellow card) 78'; Pérez (yellow card) 83'	Report	Bellingham 53'; Ceballos (yellow card) 90+6'	Stadium: Benito Villamarín; Attendance: 52,756; Referee: César Soto Grado

17 December 2023 17	Real Sociedad	0–0	Real Betis	San Sebastián
16:15 CET (UTC+1)	Olasagasti (yellow card) 85'; Le Normand (yellow card) 86'	Report	Roca (yellow card) 43'; Ruibal (yellow card) 68'; Pérez (yellow card) 78'; Isco (yellow card) 87'	Stadium: Reale Arena; Attendance: 33,172; Referee: Mateo Busquets Ferrer

21 December 2023 18	Real Betis	1–1	Girona	Seville
19:00 CET (UTC+1)	Guardado (yellow card) 45+3'; Roca (yellow card) 45+6'; Pezzella 88'	Report	Dovbyk 39' (pen.), (yellow card) 44'; A. García (yellow card) 82'	Stadium: Benito Villamarín; Attendance: 51,394; Referee: Ricardo de Burgos Bengoetxea

3 January 2024 19	Celta Vigo	2–1	Real Betis	Vigo
19:15 CET (UTC+1)	Aspas 16' (pen.); Villar (red card) 87'; Swedberg 90+6'	Report	Ruibal 6'; Carvalho (yellow card) 33'; Papastathopoulos (yellow card) 90+1'	Stadium: Balaídos; Attendance: 21,105; Referee: Miguel Ángel Ortiz Arias
Note: Villar was sent off for dissent as an unused substitute.

13 January 2024 20	Real Betis	1–0	Granada	Seville
21:00 CET (UTC+1)	Papastathopoulos (yellow card) 55'; Diao (yellow card) 65'; Isco 76', (yellow card) 90+2'	Report	Méndez (yellow card) 13'; Uzuni (yellow card) 33'; Batalla (yellow card) 43'; Puertas (yellow card) 90+4'	Stadium: Benito Villamarín; Attendance: 50,197; Referee: Guillermo Cuadra Fernández

21 January 2024 21	Real Betis	2–4	Barcelona	Seville
18:30 CET (UTC+1)	Isco 56', 59'; Abner (yellow card) 72'	Report	Torres 21', 48', 90+2'; De Jong (yellow card) 57'; Félix 90'; Vitor Roque (yellow card) 90+6'	Stadium: Benito Villamarín; Attendance: 53,288; Referee: Jesús Gil Manzano

27 January 2024 22	Mallorca	0–1	Real Betis	Palma
21:00 CET (UTC+1)	Lato (yellow card) 75'; J. Costa (yellow card) 90+5'	Report	Altimira 45+1'; Silva (yellow card) 79'	Stadium: Estadi Mallorca Son Moix; Attendance: 20,051; Referee: Javier Iglesias Villanueva

4 February 2024 23	Real Betis	1–1	Getafe	Seville
18:30 CET (UTC+1)	Papastathopoulos (yellow card) 19'; Isco 35' (pen.), (yellow card) 43'; Miranda (yellow card) 40'; Diao (yellow card) 41'; Altimira (yellow card) 52'; Cardoso (yellow card) 60'; Silva (yellow card) 89'	Report	Greenwood 8' (pen.); Álvarez (yellow card) 45'; Santiago (yellow card) 62'; Djené (yellow card) 64'; Soria (yellow card) 68'	Stadium: Benito Villamarín; Attendance: 53,336; Referee: Juan Luis Pulido Santana

9 February 2024 24	Cádiz	0–2	Real Betis	Cádiz
21:00 CET (UTC+1)	Juanmi (yellow card) 52'	Report	Willian José 6'; Fornals 46'; Papastathopoulos (yellow card) 65'	Stadium: Nuevo Mirandilla; Attendance: 15,346; Referee: Ricardo de Burgos Bengoetxea

18 February 2024 25	Real Betis	0–0	Alavés	Seville
21:00 CET (UTC+1)	Ezzalzouli (yellow card) 31'; Roca (yellow card) 45+1'; Papastathopoulos (yellow card) 71'; Pezzella (yellow card) 79'; Miranda (yellow card) 82'	Report	Marín (yellow card) 37'; Abqar (yellow card) 72'	Stadium: Benito Villamarín; Attendance: 43,514; Referee: Mateo Busquets Ferrer

25 February 2024 26	Real Betis	3–1	Athletic Bilbao	Seville
16:15 CET (UTC+1)	Ávila 13', (yellow card) 30'; Berchiche 38' (o.g.); Cardoso 67'	Report	Berchiche (yellow card) 32'; N. Williams (yellow card) 40' (yellow-red card) 40'; Berenguer (yellow card) 41'; Vivian (yellow card) 47'; Guruzeta 45+7'; Imanol (yellow card) 59'	Stadium: Benito Villamarín; Attendance: 53,537; Referee: Guillermo Cuadra Fernández

3 March 2024 27	Atlético Madrid	2–1	Real Betis	Madrid
16:15 CET (UTC+1)	Silva 8' (o.g.); De Paul (yellow card) 18'; Morata (penalty missed) 28', 44'	Report	Carvalho 62'; Pezzella (yellow card) 67'; Rodríguez (yellow card) 85'	Stadium: Cívitas Metropolitano; Attendance: 61,901; Referee: César Soto Grado

10 March 2024 28	Real Betis	2–3	Villarreal	Seville
21:00 CET (UTC+1)	Rodríguez 30'; Willian José 45+2'; Ávila (yellow card) 69' (yellow-red card) 70'; Cardoso (yellow card) 90+1'	Report	Traoré (yellow card) 29'; Sørloth 40'; Papastathopoulos 48' (o.g.); Baena 67'; Moreno (yellow card) 69' (yellow-red card) 70'; Jörgensen (yellow card) 78'	Stadium: Benito Villamarín; Attendance: 47,711; Referee: Alejandro Hernández Hernández

17 March 2024 29	Rayo Vallecano	2–0	Real Betis	Madrid
18:30 CET (UTC+1)	De Tomás (yellow card) 28'; Lejeune 40', (yellow card) 86'; Mumin (yellow card) 45+2'; Camello 78'; Ciss (yellow card) 90+8'	Report	Pérez (yellow card) 29'; Pezzella (yellow card) 38'; Isco (yellow card) 83'; Carvalho (yellow card) 90+4'	Stadium: Campo de Fútbol de Vallecas; Attendance: 13,264; Referee: Juan Luis Pulido Santana

31 March 2024 30	Girona	3–2	Real Betis	Girona
16:15 CEST (UTC+2)	Dovbyk 36' (pen.), 65'; Martín (yellow card) 41'; Torre (yellow card) 88'; Stuani 90+2'; Herrera (yellow card) 90+5'	Report	Isco (yellow card) 31'; Riad (yellow card) 45+1'; Willian José 45+4', 76'; Ávila (yellow card) 83'; Fornals (yellow card) 90+5'	Stadium: Montilivi; Attendance: 12,774; Referee: Jesús Gil Manzano

12 April 2024 31	Real Betis	2–1	Celta Vigo	Seville
21:00 CEST (UTC+2)	Pezzella (yellow card) 45+2'; Miranda 53'; Fekir 83'	Report	Larsen 90+1'	Stadium: Benito Villamarín; Attendance: 47,341; Referee: Juan Martínez Munuera

20 April 2024 32	Valencia	1–2	Real Betis	Valencia
18:30 CEST (UTC+2)	Pepelu (yellow card) 43', (goal) 66' (pen.); Guillamón (yellow card) 77'	Report	Sabaly (yellow card) 13'; Pérez 19', 77'; Miranda (yellow card) 64'; Bakambu (yellow card) 64'	Stadium: Mestalla; Attendance: 46,371; Referee: Mateo Busquets Ferrer

28 April 2024 33	Real Betis	1–1	Sevilla	Seville
21:00 CEST (UTC+2)	Fornals (yellow card) 6'; Isco 38' (pen.), (yellow card) 40'; Cardoso (yellow card) 90+4'	Report	En-Nesyri (yellow card) 16'; Salas 56', (yellow card) 90+4'; Soumaré (yellow card) 61'; Suso (yellow card) 74'; Acuña (yellow card) 81'	Stadium: Benito Villamarín; Attendance: 55,770; Referee: José María Sánchez Martínez

5 May 2024 34	Osasuna	0–2	Real Betis	Pamplona
14:00 CEST (UTC+2)	U. García (yellow card) 25'; Moncayola (red card) 26'; Ra. García (yellow card) 42'	Report	Miranda (yellow card) 38'; Pérez 41'; Fornals 45+3'; Silva (yellow card) 86'	Stadium: El Sadar; Attendance: 18,300; Referee: Víctor García Verdura

12 May 2024 35	Real Betis	3–2	Almería	Seville
21:00 CEST (UTC+2)	Fornals 8'; Isco 28'; Pérez 64'	Report	Peña (yellow card) 40'; Baptistão 45+1'; Romero 66'; Chumi (yellow card) 69'	Stadium: Benito Villamarín; Attendance: 48,622; Referee: Alejandro Muñiz Ruiz

16 May 2024 36	Las Palmas	2–2	Real Betis	Las Palmas
18:30 WEST (UTC+1)	Suárez (yellow card) 5', (goal) 27'; Moleiro 64'; Coco (yellow card) 70'	Report	Mármol 21' (o.g.); Ruibal (yellow card) 26'; Pérez 49'	Stadium: Estadio Gran Canaria; Attendance: 22,606; Referee: Javier Iglesias Villanueva

19 May 2024 37	Real Betis	0–2	Real Sociedad	Seville
19:00 CEST (UTC+2)	Sabaly (yellow card) 58'; Ezzalzouli (penalty missed) 66'; Miranda (yellow card) 83'; Fekir (yellow card) 90+1'	Report	Méndez 5'; Merino 42'; Turrientes (yellow card) 52'; Traoré (yellow card) 74'; Becker (yellow card) 78'; Aramburu (yellow card) 90+1'	Stadium: Benito Villamarín; Attendance: 58,036; Referee: Juan Martínez Munuera

25 May 2024 38	Real Madrid	0–0	Real Betis	Madrid
21:00 CEST (UTC+2)	Nacho (yellow card) 5'; Carvajal (yellow card) 72'	Report	Papastathopoulos (yellow card) 84'	Stadium: Santiago Bernabéu; Attendance: 73,614; Referee: Isidro Díaz de Mera Escuderos

=== Copa del Rey ===
1 November 2023 First round	Hernán Cortés	1–12	Real Betis	Almendralejo
20:30 CET (UTC+1)	Márquez 55'	Report	Rodri 4', 20', 37'; Willian José 6', 33', 40', 43', (penalty missed) 33'; Luiz Henrique 9'; Ezzalzouli 16', 50'; Roca 86' (pen.); Diao 90'	Stadium: Francisco de la Hera; Attendance: 11,580; Referee: Isidro Díaz de Mera Escuderos
Note: The match was played at the Francisco de la Hera in Almendralejo, instead of Hernán Cortés' regular stadium, the Campo Municipal de Hernán Cortés, which did not meet the broadcasting requirements.

6 December 2023 Second round	Villanovense	1–2	Real Betis	Villanueva de la Serena
19:00 CET (UTC+1)	Gonzáaez (yellow card) 6'; Relu (yellow card) 43'; Hurtado (yellow card) 58'; Cano 63'	Report	Luiz Henrique (yellow card) 34'; Ezzalzouli 89'; Iglesias 90+3'	Stadium: Estadio Romero Cuerda; Attendance: 8,000; Referee: Javier Alberola Rojas

6 January 2024 Round of 32	Alavés	1–0	Real Betis	Vitoria-Gasteiz
20:00 CET (UTC+1)	Benavídez 57'; Duarte (yellow card) 88'	Report	Roca (yellow card) 8'; Mendy (yellow card) 72'	Stadium: Mendizorrotza; Attendance: 13,567; Referee: Javier Iglesias Villanueva

=== UEFA Europa League ===
==== Group stage ====
The draw for the group stage was held on 1 September 2023.

Pos	Team	Pld	W	D	L	GF	GA	GD	Pts	Qualification	RAN	SPP	BET	ALI
1	(Scotland) Rangers	6	3	2	1	8	6	+2	11	Advance to round of 16	—	2–1	1–0	1–1
2	(Czech Republic) Sparta Prague	6	3	1	2	9	7	+2	10	Advance to knockout round play-offs	0–0	—	1–0	3–2
3	(Spain) Real Betis	6	3	0	3	9	7	+2	9	Transfer to Europa Conference League	2–3	2–1	—	4–1
4	(Cyprus) Aris Limassol	6	1	1	4	7	13	−6	4		2–1	1–3	0–1	—

Source: UEFA
Rules for classification: Group stage tiebreakers

21 September 2023 1	Rangers (Scotland)	1–0	(Spain) Real Betis	Glasgow, Scotland
20:00 BST (UTC+1)	Goldson (yellow card) 65'; Sima 68'	Report	Bartra (yellow card) 54'; Bravo (yellow card) 69'; Pezzella (yellow card) 81'	Stadium: Ibrox Stadium; Attendance: 45,634; Referee: Lawrence Visser (Belgium)

5 October 2023 2	Real Betis (Spain)	2–1	(Czech Republic) Sparta Prague	Seville
18:45 CEST (UTC+2)	Diao 9', (yellow card) 45+4'; Rodríguez (yellow card) 11'; Ruibal (yellow card) 58'; Isco 79'; Abner (yellow card) 90+2'	Report	Birmančević 3', (yellow card) 45+5'; Haraslín (yellow card) 15'; Ryneš (yellow card) 75'	Stadium: Benito Villamarín; Attendance: 45,037; Referee: Duje Strukan (Croatia)

26 October 2023 3	Aris Limassol (Cyprus)	0–1	(Spain) Real Betis	Limassol, Cyprus
19:45 EEST (UTC+3)	Bengtsson (yellow card) 28'; Gomis (yellow card) 55'	Report	Pérez (yellow card) 60', (goal) 75'; Guardado (yellow card) 90+3'	Stadium: Alphamega Stadium; Attendance: 3,945; Referee: Filip Glova (Slovakia)

9 November 2023 4	Real Betis (Spain)	4–1	(Cyprus) Aris Limassol	Seville
21:00 CET (UTC+1)	Iglesias 34'; Ruibal 64'; Fekir (penalty missed) 76'; Rodríguez (yellow card) 77'; Roca 79'; Ezzalzouli 90+4'	Report	Struski (yellow card) 71'; Kokorin 84'	Stadium: Benito Villamarín; Attendance: 41,768; Referee: Mohammed Al-Hakim (Sweden)

30 November 2023 5	Sparta Prague (Czech Republic)	1–0	(Spain) Real Betis	Prague, Czech Republic
18:45 CET (UTC+1)	Birmančević (yellow card) 38'; Haraslín 54'	Report	Ruibal (yellow card) 22'; Pezzella (yellow card) 70'; Miranda (yellow card) 88'; Rodríguez (yellow card) 90+2'	Stadium: Stadion Letná; Attendance: 18,095; Referee: Nikola Dabanović (Montenegro)

14 December 2023 6	Real Betis (Spain)	2–3	(Scotland) Rangers	Seville
21:00 CET (UTC+1)	Miranda 14'; Pérez 37'; Isco (yellow card) 58'; Roca (yellow card) 88'	Report	Sima 10'; Dessers 20'; Lundstram (yellow card) 64'; Roofe 78', (yellow card) 90'; Tavernier (yellow card) 82'	Stadium: Benito Villamarín; Attendance: 48,380; Referee: Srđan Jovanović (Serbia)

=== UEFA Europa Conference League ===
==== Knockout phase ====
===== Knockout round play-offs =====
The draw for the knockout round play-offs was held on 18 December 2023.

15 February 2024 First leg	Real Betis (Spain)	0–1	(Croatia) Dinamo Zagreb	Seville
21:00 CET (UTC+1)	Diao (yellow card) 80'; Willian José (yellow card) 90+1'; Pezzella (yellow card) 90+1'	Report	Petković 76' (pen.); Baturina (yellow card) 81'; Špikić (yellow card) 82'	Stadium: Benito Villamarín; Attendance: 25,091; Referee: Mykola Balakin (Ukraine)

22 February 2024 Second leg	Dinamo Zagreb (Croatia)	1–1 (2–1 agg.)	(Spain) Real Betis	Zagreb, Croatia
18:45 CET (UTC+1)	Petković (yellow card) 40'; Kaneko 59'	Report	Bakambu 38'; Ruibal (yellow card) 56'; Carvalho (yellow card) 69'	Stadium: Stadion Maksimir; Attendance: 18,002; Referee: Urs Schnyder (Switzerland)

== Statistics ==
=== Appearances and goals ===
Last updated 25 May 2024.

No.	Pos	Nat	Player	Total		La Liga		Copa del Rey		UEFA Europa League		UEFA Europa Conference League	
No.	Pos	Nat	Player	Apps	Goals	Apps	Goals	Apps	Goals	Apps	Goals	Apps	Goals
Goalkeepers
1	GK	(Chile) CHI	Claudio Bravo	9	0	7	0	0	0	2	0	0	0
13	GK	(Portugal) POR	Rui Silva	37	0	28	0	3	0	4	0	2	0
30	GK	(Spain) ESP	Fran Vieites	4	0	3+1	0	0	0	0	0	0	0
Defenders
2	DF	(Spain) ESP	Héctor Bellerín	30	0	20+3	0	1+1	0	2+1	0	0+2	0
3	DF	(Spain) ESP	Juan Miranda	32	2	21+4	1	2	0	2+1	1	2	0
6	DF	(Argentina) ARG	Germán Pezzella	40	1	32	1	1	0	6	0	1	0
15	DF	(Spain) ESP	Marc Bartra	4	0	3	0	0	0	1	0	0	0
19	DF	(Greece) GRE	Sokratis Papastathopoulos	16	0	12+3	0	1	0	0	0	0	0
20	DF	(Brazil) BRA	Abner	29	0	15+8	0	1	0	4+1	0	0	0
23	DF	(Senegal) SEN	Youssouf Sabaly	12	0	12	0	0	0	0	0	0	0
24	DF	(Spain) ESP	Aitor Ruibal	28	3	11+7	2	2+1	0	4+1	1	2	0
28	DF	(Morocco) MAR	Chadi Riad	30	0	24+2	0	2	0	0	0	2	0
32	DF	(France) FRA	Nobel Mendy	1	0	0	0	1	0	0	0	0	0
33	DF	(Spain) ESP	Xavi Pleguezuelo	1	0	0	0	0	0	0	0	0+1	0
34	DF	(Spain) ESP	Ricardo Visus	4	0	1+2	0	0+1	0	0	0	0	0
42	DF	(Spain) ESP	Pablo Busto	2	0	0+2	0	0	0	0	0	0	0
Midfielders
4	MF	(United States) USA	Johnny Cardoso	19	1	15+2	1	0	0	0	0	2	0
5	MF	(Argentina) ARG	Guido Rodríguez	29	2	22+2	2	0	0	4+1	0	0	0
8	MF	(France) FRA	Nabil Fekir	25	1	10+9	1	0+1	0	2+1	0	2	0
14	MF	(Portugal) POR	William Carvalho	29	1	4+18	1	1	0	4	0	2	0
17	MF	(Spain) ESP	Rodri	36	3	9+20	0	2	3	1+2	0	1+1	0
18	MF	(Spain) ESP	Pablo Fornals	15	3	14+1	3	0	0	0	0	0	0
21	MF	(Spain) ESP	Marc Roca	37	4	24+2	2	1+2	1	6	1	1+1	0
22	MF	(Spain) ESP	Isco	36	9	28+1	8	1	0	3+3	1	0	0
27	MF	(Spain) ESP	Sergi Altimira	17	1	6+8	1	3	0	0	0	0	0
39	MF	(Spain) ESP	Ginés Sorroche	1	0	0	0	0	0	0	0	0+1	0
40	MF	(Spain) ESP	Enrique Fernández	1	0	0	0	0	0	0+1	0	0	0
Forwards
7	FW	(Morocco) MAR	Abde Ezzalzouli	36	5	6+20	1	2	3	5+1	1	2	0
9	FW	(Argentina) ARG	Chimy Ávila	6	1	4+2	1	0	0	0	0	0	0
10	FW	(Spain) ESP	Ayoze Pérez	38	11	29+2	9	1	0	2+4	2	0	0
11	FW	(Democratic Republic of the Congo) COD	Cédric Bakambu	5	1	2+2	0	0	0	0	0	1	1
12	FW	(Brazil) BRA	Willian José	43	14	25+8	10	2+1	4	1+4	0	1+1	0
38	FW	(Spain) ESP	Assane Diao	28	4	13+5	2	1+2	1	3+2	1	1+1	0
Players who transferred out during the season
4	MF	(Ivory Coast) CIV	Paul Akouokou	2	0	0+2	0	0	0	0	0	0	0
9	FW	(Spain) ESP	Borja Iglesias	18	2	4+7	0	1	1	5+1	1	0	0
11	FW	(Brazil) BRA	Luiz Henrique	21	1	6+8	0	2	1	3+2	0	0	0
16	FW	(Spain) ESP	Juan Cruz	8	0	0+5	0	0+3	0	0	0	0	0
18	MF	(Mexico) MEX	Andrés Guardado	19	0	4+8	0	2	0	3+2	0	0	0
19	DF	(Italy) ITA	Luiz Felipe	4	0	4	0	0	0	0	0	0	0

=== Goalscorers ===
Position	Players	LaLiga	Copa del Rey	E.L.	C.L.	Total
FW	(Brazil) Willian José	10	4	0	0	14
FW	(Spain) Ayoze Pérez	9	0	2	0	11
MF	(Spain) Isco	8	0	1	0	9
FW	(Morocco) Abde Ezzalzouli	1	3	1	0	5
MF	(Spain) Marc Roca	2	1	1	0	4
MF	(Spain) Pablo Fornals	3	0	0	0	3
MF	(Spain) Rodri	0	3	0	0	3
DF	(Spain) Aitor Ruibal	2	0	1	0	3
FW	(Spain) Assane Diao	0	1	1	0	2
FW	(Spain) Borja Iglesias	0	1	1	0	2
DF	(Spain) Juan Miranda	1	0	1	0	2
MF	(Argentina) Guido Rodríguez	2	0	0	0	2
MF	(Spain) Sergi Altimira	1	0	0	0	1
FW	(Argentina) Chimy Ávila	1	0	0	0	1
FW	(Democratic Republic of the Congo) Cédric Bakambu	0	0	0	1	1
MF	(United States) Johnny Cardoso	1	0	0	0	1
MF	(Portugal) William Carvalho	1	0	0	0	1
FW	(France) Nabil Fekir	1	0	0	0	1
FW	(Brazil) Luiz Henrique	0	1	0	0	1
DF	(Argentina) Germán Pezzella	1	0	0	0	1
