= 2020–21 Real Betis season =

Real Betis
2020–21 season
- President: Ángel Haro
- Head coach: Manuel Pellegrini
- Stadium: Benito Villamarín
- La Liga: 6th
- Copa del Rey: Quarter-finals
- Top goalscorer: League: Borja Iglesias (11); All: Borja Iglesias (13)
- Biggest win: by two goals (ten times)
- Biggest defeat: Athletic Bilbao 4–0 Real Betis
Home colours	Away colours	Third colours

The 2020–21 season was the 113th season in the existence of Real Betis and the club's sixth consecutive season in the top flight of Spanish football. In addition to the domestic league, Real Betis participated in this season's edition of the Copa del Rey. The season covered the period from 20 July 2020 to 30 June 2021, with the late start to the season due to the COVID-19 pandemic in Spain.

== Players ==
=== First-team squad ===
As of 11 February 2021.

Note: Flags indicate national team as defined under FIFA eligibility rules; some limited exceptions apply. Players may hold more than one non-FIFA nationality.

No.	Pos.	Nation	Player
1	GK	ESP	Joel Robles
2	DF	ESP	Martín Montoya
3	MF	ESP	Víctor Camarasa
4	MF	CIV	Paul Akouokou
5	DF	ESP	Marc Bartra
6	DF	ESP	Victor Ruiz
7	FW	ESP	Juanmi
8	FW	FRA	Nabil Fekir
9	FW	ESP	Borja Iglesias
10	MF	ESP	Sergio Canales
11	FW	ESP	Cristian Tello
12	DF	BRA	Sidnei
13	GK	ESP	Dani Martín

No.	Pos.	Nation	Player
14	MF	POR	William Carvalho
15	DF	ESP	Álex Moreno
16	FW	ESP	Loren Morón
17	FW	ESP	Joaquín (captain)
18	MF	MEX	Andrés Guardado (3rd captain)
20	FW	MEX	Diego Lainez
21	MF	ARG	Guido Rodríguez
22	DF	BRA	Emerson (on loan from Barcelona)
23	DF	ALG	Aïssa Mandi (vice-captain)
24	FW	ESP	Aitor Ruibal
25	GK	CHI	Claudio Bravo
33	DF	ESP	Juan Miranda (on loan from Barcelona)

=== Reserve team ===
Note: Flags indicate national team as defined under FIFA eligibility rules; some limited exceptions apply. Players may hold more than one non-FIFA nationality.

No.	Pos.	Nation	Player
28	MF	ESP	Rodri
30	GK	ESP	Daniel Rebollo
31	GK	ESP	Carlos Marín

No.	Pos.	Nation	Player
32	DF	ESP	Fran Delgado
37	DF	ESP	Geovanni Barba
38	DF	ESP	José Calderón

=== Out on loan ===
Note: Flags indicate national team as defined under FIFA eligibility rules; some limited exceptions apply. Players may hold more than one non-FIFA nationality.

No.	Pos.	Nation	Player
—	DF	ESP	Edgar González (at (Spain) Oviedo until 30 June 2021)
—	DF	ESP	Ricardo Visus (at (Spain) Córdoba B until 30 June 2021)

No.	Pos.	Nation	Player
—	FW	ESP	Rober (at (Spain) Las Palmas until 30 June 2021)

== Transfers ==
=== In ===
Date	Player	From	Type	Fee	Ref
30 June 2020	(Spain) Liberto Beltrán	Lleida Esportiu	Loan return		
20 July 2020	(Spain) Víctor Camarasa	Alavés	Loan return		
20 July 2020	(Spain) Aitor Ruibal	Leganés	Loan return		
21 July 2020	(Colombia) Juanjo Narváez	Las Palmas	Loan return		
24 July 2020	(Spain) Julio Gracia	Badajoz	Loan return		
3 August 2020	(Paraguay) Antonio Sanabria	(Italy) Genoa	Loan return		
17 August 2020	(Spain) Francis Guerrero	Almería	Loan return		
17 August 2020	(Cameroon) Wilfrid Kaptoum	Almería	Loan return		
25 August 2020	(Spain) Martín Montoya	(England) Brighton & Hove Albion	Transfer	Free	
30 August 2020	(Chile) Claudio Bravo	(England) Manchester City	Transfer	Free	
31 August 2020	(Spain) Victor Ruiz	(Turkey) Beşiktaş	Transfer	Free	
3 October 2020	(Spain) Ismael Gutiérrez	Alavés	Loan return		
5 October 2020	(Spain) Juan Miranda	Barcelona	Loan		

=== Out ===
Date	Player	To	Type	Fee	Ref
20 July 2020	(Spain) Carles Aleñá	Barcelona	Loan return		
20 July 2020	(Spain) Alfonso Pedraza	Villarreal	Loan return		
4 August 2020	(Argentina) Giovani Lo Celso	(England) Tottenham Hotspur	Buyout clause	€32M	
17 August 2020	(Spain) Julio Gracia	Getafe B	Transfer	Free	
18 August 2020	(Spain) Liberto Beltrán	Albacete	Transfer	Free	
18 August 2020	(Morocco) Zouhair Feddal	(Portugal) Sporting CP	Transfer	Free	
19 August 2020	(Spain) Javi García	(Portugal) Boavista	Transfer	Free	
3 September 2020	(Spain) Edgar González	Oviedo	Loan		
4 September 2020	(Colombia) Juanjo Narváez	Zaragoza	Transfer	Free	
3 October 2020	(Spain) Ismael Gutiérrez	Atlético Madrid B	Transfer	€1M	
4 October 2020	(Spain) Antonio Barragán	Elche	Transfer	Free	
5 October 2020	(Cameroon) Wilfrid Kaptoum	New England Revolution	Free		
19 October 2020	(Spain) Francis Guerrero	Free agent	-	-	
31 January 2021	(Paraguay) Antonio Sanabria	(Italy) Torino	Transfer	Undisclosed	

== Pre-season and friendlies ==
Win Draw Loss

22 August 2020 Friendly	Real Betis	1–0	Cádiz	San Pedro de Alcántara, Spain
19:30 CEST (UTC+2)	Juanmi 87'	Report		Stadium: Marbella Football Center; Attendance: 0

29 August 2020 Friendly	Real Betis	Cancelled	Farense	Marbella, Spain
19:00 CEST (UTC+2)				Stadium: Estadio Municipal de Marbella

2 September 2020 Friendly	Real Betis	2–0	Almería	Marbella, Spain
19:30 CEST (UTC+2)	Bartra 28'; Ruibal 90+2'	Report		Stadium: Estadio Municipal de Marbella; Attendance: 0

5 September 2020 Friendly	Real Betis	3–2	Granada	Marbella, Spain
19:30 CEST (UTC+2)	Iglesias 47'; Bartra 80'; Juanmi 88'	Report	Montoro 51'; Antoñín 90+1'	Stadium: Estadio Municipal de Marbella; Attendance: 0

== Competitions ==
=== Overall record ===
Competition	First match	Last match	Starting round	Final position	Record							
Competition	First match	Last match	Starting round	Final position	Pld	W	D	L	GF	GA	GD	Win %
La Liga	13 September 2020	22 May 2021	Matchday 1	6th	38	17	10	11	50	50	+0	44.74
Copa del Rey	17 December 2020	4 February 2021	First round	Quarter-finals	5	4	1	0	11	3	+8	80.00
Total					43	21	11	11	61	53	+8	48.84

Source: Soccerway

=== La Liga ===
==== League table ====
Pos	Team	Pld	W	D	L	GF	GA	GD	Pts	Qualification or relegation
4	Sevilla	38	24	5	9	53	33	+20	77	Qualification for the Champions League group stage
5	Real Sociedad	38	17	11	10	59	38	+21	62	Qualification for the Europa League group stage (Note: Since the winners of the 2020–21 Copa del Rey, Barcelona, qualified for the 2021–22 UEFA Champions League based on league position, the spot awarded to the cup winners (Europa League group stage) was passed to the sixth-placed team, and the spot awarded to the sixth-placed team (2021–22 UEFA Europa Conference League play-off round) was passed to the seventh-placed team, Villarreal.)
6	Real Betis	38	17	10	11	50	50	0	61	Qualification for the Europa League group stage
7	Villarreal	38	15	13	10	60	44	+16	58	Qualification for the Champions League group stage (Note: Villarreal qualified for the 2021–22 UEFA Champions League by winning the 2020–21 UEFA Europa League. Based on their league position (7th), they would have received the spot above to enter the Europa Conference League play-off round. This spot was vacated without replacement as per UEFA regulations.)
8	Celta Vigo	38	14	11	13	55	57	−2	53	

Source: La Liga
Rules for classification: 1) Points; 2) Head-to-head points; 3) Head-to-head goal difference; 4) Goal difference; 5) Goals scored; 6) Fair-play points (Note: Head-to-head record is used only after all the matches between the teams in question have been played)

==== Results summary ====
Overall								Home						Away					
Pld	W	D	L	GF	GA	GD	Pts	W	D	L	GF	GA	GD	W	D	L	GF	GA	GD
38	17	10	11	50	50	0	61	10	5	4	27	21	+6	7	5	7	23	29	−6

Source: La Liga

==== Results by round ====
Round	1	2	3	4	5	6	7	8	9	10	11	12	13	14	15	16	17	18	19	20	21	22	23	24	25	26	27	28	29	30	31	32	33	34	35	36	37	38
Ground	A	H	H	A	A	H	A	H	A	A	H	A	H	A	H	A	H	A	H	A	H	H	A	H	A	H	A	H	A	H	H	A	H	A	H	A	H	A
Result	W	W	L	L	W	L	L	W	L	L	L	W	D	L	W	L	D	W	W	D	W	L	W	W	W	W	L	W	D	D	D	D	D	D	W	D	W	W
Position	4	2	1	7	2	7	10	7	7	12	15	8	10	12	9	10	11	10	8	8	7	7	7	7	6	6	6	6	6	6	6	6	6	7	6	6	6	6

Source: La Liga
A = Away; H = Home; W = Win; D = Draw; L = Loss

==== Matches ====
The league fixtures were announced on 31 August 2020.

13 September 2020 1	Alavés	0–1	Real Betis	Vitoria-Gasteiz
14:00 CEST (UTC+2)	Rioja (yellow card) 23'; López (yellow card) 69'; Pina (yellow card) 81'	Report	Emerson (yellow card) 63'; Moreno (yellow card) 72'; Iglesias (yellow card) 81'; Tello 90+5'	Stadium: Mendizorrotza Stadium; Attendance: 0 (Note: The match was played behind closed doors due to the COVID-19 pandemic in Spain.); Referee: Pablo González Fuertes

20 September 2020 2	Real Betis	2–0	Valladolid	Seville
18:30 CEST (UTC+2)	Fekir 10' (pen.), (yellow card) 30'; Carvalho 18'; Emerson (yellow card) 58'; Rodríguez (yellow card) 58'	Report		Stadium: Benito Villamarín; Attendance: 0 Referee: Santiago Jaime Latre

26 September 2020 3	Real Betis	2–3	Real Madrid	Seville
21:00 CEST (UTC+2)	Emerson (yellow card) 12', (red card) 67'; Mandi 35', (yellow card) 90+1'; Carvalho 37'; Rodríguez (yellow card) 40'; Bartra (yellow card) 81'	Report	Valverde 13'; Carvajal (yellow card) 42'; Emerson 48' (o.g.); Modrić (yellow card) 53'; Ramos 82' (pen.)	Stadium: Benito Villamarín; Attendance: 0 Referee: Ricardo De Burgos Bengoetxea

29 September 2020 4	Getafe	3–0	Real Betis	Getafe
21:30 CEST (UTC+2)	Ángel 13', 42'; Suárez (yellow card) 22'; Olivera (yellow card) 37'; Cucurella 39'; Arambarri (yellow card) 67'; Cabaco (yellow card) 84'	Report	Fekir (yellow card) 71'; Akouokou (yellow card) 78'; Mandi (yellow card) 82' (yellow-red card) 83'	Stadium: Coliseum Alfonso Pérez; Attendance: 0 Referee: Juan Martínez Munuera

3 October 2020 5	Valencia	0–2	Real Betis	Valencia
21:00 CEST (UTC+2)	Guedes (yellow card) 12'; Guillamón (yellow card) 45'	Report	Bartra (yellow card) 2'; Canales 19', (yellow card) 53'; Tello 74'	Stadium: Mestalla; Attendance: 0 Referee: Guillermo Cuadra Fernández

18 October 2020 6	Real Betis	0–3	Real Sociedad	Seville
21:00 CEST (UTC+2)	Sidnei (yellow card) 53'; Bartra (yellow card) 72'	Report	Portu 43'; Oyarzabal 74' (pen.); Isak (yellow card) 87'; Januzaj 88'	Stadium: Benito Villamarín; Attendance: 0 Referee: Xavier Estrada Fernández

24 October 2020 7	Atlético Madrid	2–0	Real Betis	Madrid
21:00 CEST (UTC+2)	Suárez (yellow card) 41', (goal) 90+1'; Llorente 46'; Koke (yellow card) 50'	Report	Montoya (red card) 72'	Stadium: Wanda Metropolitano; Attendance: 0 Referee: Antonio Mateu Lahoz

1 November 2020 8	Real Betis	3–1	Elche	Seville
14:00 CET (UTC+1)	Sanabria 7', (yellow card) 64'; Tello 29', 56'; Fekir (penalty missed) 45+1', (yellow card) 51'	Report	Sánchez (yellow card) 41'; Josan 60'	Stadium: Benito Villamarín; Attendance: 0 Referee: David Medié Jiménez

7 November 2020 9	Barcelona	5–2	Real Betis	Barcelona
16:15 CET (UTC+1)	Dembélé 22'; Griezmann (penalty missed) 33', 49'; Fati (yellow card) 37'; Pedri (yellow card) 41', (goal) 90'; Messi 61' (pen.), 82'	Report	Mandi (yellow card) 32', (red card) 60'; Moreno (yellow card) 45'; Sanabria 45+2'; Loren 73'	Stadium: Camp Nou; Attendance: 0 Referee: Guillermo Cuadra Fernández

23 November 2020 10	Athletic Bilbao	4–0	Real Betis	Bilbao
21:00 CET (UTC+1)	Ruiz 9' (o.g.); Capa 33'; Muniain 59'; Berenguer 68'	Report		Stadium: San Mamés; Attendance: 0 Referee: Javier Alberola Rojas

30 November 2020 11	Real Betis	0–2	Eibar	Seville
21:00 CET (UTC+1)	Emerson (yellow card) 15'; Rodríguez (yellow card) 79'	Report	Muto 49'; Burgos 54' (pen.); Gil (yellow card) 64'; Enrich (penalty missed) 89'	Stadium: Benito Villamarín; Attendance: 0 Referee: Juan Martínez Munuera

6 December 2020 12	Osasuna	0–2	Real Betis	Pamplona
16:15 CET (UTC+1)	Aridane (yellow card) 29'; Brašanac (yellow card) 32'; Pérez (yellow card) 43'	Report	Ruiz (yellow card) 51'; Loren (yellow card) 63'; Iglesias 76'; Miranda 90+1'	Stadium: El Sadar Stadium; Attendance: 0 Referee: Alejandro Hernández Hernández

13 December 2020 13	Real Betis	1–1	Villarreal	Seville
16:15 CET (UTC+1)	Iglesias (yellow card) 12'; Ruibal 51'; Rodríguez (yellow card) 64'	Report	Torres 5'; Niño (yellow card) 15'; Trigueros (yellow card) 17'; Pedraza (yellow card) 49'	Stadium: Benito Villamarín; Attendance: 0 Referee: Valentín Pizarro Gómez

20 December 2020 14	Granada	2–0	Real Betis	Granada
16:15 CET (UTC+1)	Herrera (yellow card) 9'; Soldado 14' (pen.), 20', (yellow card) 15'; Gonalons (yellow card) 30'	Report	Rodríguez (yellow card) 11'; Emerson (yellow card) 67'; Fekir (yellow card) 87'	Stadium: Nuevo Los Cármenes; Attendance: 0 Referee: José María Sánchez Martínez

23 December 2020 15	Real Betis	1–0	Cádiz	Seville
22:00 CET (UTC+1)	Sanabria (yellow card) 58'; Rodríguez 71'	Report	Malbašić (yellow card) 37'	Stadium: Benito Villamarín; Attendance: 0 Referee: Antonio Mateu Lahoz

29 December 2020 16	Levante	4–3	Real Betis	Valencia
21:30 CET (UTC+1)	Duarte 2'; Roger (yellow card) 16', (goal) 55'; Morales 22', 24'; De Frutos (yellow card) 45+2'; Róber (red card) 68'; Clerc (yellow card) 75'	Report	Mandi 12', (yellow card) 90'; Canales 78' (pen.), 86'; Akouokou (yellow card) 81'	Stadium: Ciutat de València; Attendance: 0 Referee: Xavier Estrada Fernández

2 January 2021 17	Real Betis	1–1	Sevilla	Seville
16:15 CET (UTC+1)	Miranda (yellow card) 20'; Ruiz (yellow card) 28'; Rodríguez (yellow card) 45+1'; Canales 51' (pen.); Lainez (yellow card) 58'; Fekir (penalty missed) 75'; Emerson (yellow card) 85'	Report	Torres (yellow card) 42'; Suso 48'; Rakitić (yellow card) 89'	Stadium: Benito Villamarín; Attendance: 0 Referee: Carlos del Cerro Grande

11 January 2021 18	Huesca	0–2	Real Betis	Huesca
21:00 CET (UTC+1)	Ontiveros (yellow card) 56'; Insua (yellow card) 85'	Report	Akouokou (yellow card) 51' (yellow-red card) 82'; Mandi 78'; Sanabria 90+4'	Stadium: Estadio El Alcoraz; Attendance: 0 Referee: Adrián Cordero Vega

20 January 2021 19	Real Betis	2–1	Celta Vigo	Seville
21:00 CET (UTC+1)	Ruiz (yellow card) 10'; Canales 25', 44'; Robles (yellow card) 69'	Report	Mina 15'; Martín (yellow card) 35'; Suárez (yellow card) 70'; Tapia (yellow card) 90+1'	Stadium: Benito Villamarín; Attendance: 0 Referee: Juan Martínez Munuera

23 January 2021 20	Real Sociedad	2–2	Real Betis	San Sebastián
18:30 CET (UTC+1)	Isak 48'; Oyarzabal 57'; Merino (yellow card) 69'; Zaldúa (yellow card) 86'	Report	Akouokou (yellow card) 51'; Canales 85'; Miranda (yellow card) 90+1'; Joaquín 90+2'	Stadium: Anoeta; Attendance: 0 Referee: César Soto Grado

1 February 2021 21	Real Betis	1–0	Osasuna	Seville
21:00 CET (UTC+1)	Iglesias 79'; Robles (yellow card) 87'	Report	Moncayola (yellow card) 59'	Stadium: Benito Villamarín; Attendance: 0 Referee: Javier Alberola Rojas

7 February 2021 22	Real Betis	2–3	Barcelona	Seville
21:00 CET (UTC+1)	Iglesias 38'; Ruiz 75', (yellow card) 77'	Report	De Jong (yellow card) 47'; Messi 59'; Dembélé (yellow card) 64'; Ruiz 68' (o.g.); Busquets (yellow card) 74'; Trincão 87'	Stadium: Benito Villamarín; Attendance: 0 Referee: Carlos del Cerro Grande

14 February 2021 23	Villarreal	1–2	Real Betis	Villarreal
21:00 CET (UTC+1)	Parejo (yellow card) 43'; Foyth (yellow card) 55'; Gerard 65' (pen.); Peña (yellow card) 85'	Report	Fekir 45'; Emerson 52', (yellow card) 55'; Miranda (yellow card) 90+5'	Stadium: Estadio de la Cerámica; Attendance: 0 Referee: Jesús Gil Manzano

19 February 2021 24	Real Betis	1–0	Getafe	Seville
21:00 CET (UTC+1)	Canales (yellow card) 62', (penalty missed) 76'; Rodríguez (yellow card) 66'; Guardado (yellow card) 70'; Iglesias 84' (pen.); Carvalho (yellow card) 90+1' (yellow-red card) 90+3'	Report	Cabaco (yellow card) 38'; Arambarri (yellow card) 45'; Chakla (yellow card) 75'; Nyom (yellow card) 80'; Aleñá (yellow card) 90+1'	Stadium: Benito Villamarín; Attendance: 0 Referee: Xavier Estrada Fernández

28 February 2021 25	Cádiz	0–1	Real Betis	Cádiz
16:15 CET (UTC+1)	Espino (yellow card) 80'	Report	Lainez (yellow card) 57'; Juanmi (yellow card) 61', (goal) 84'	Stadium: Ramón de Carranza; Attendance: 0 Referee: Antonio Mateu Lahoz

8 March 2021 26	Real Betis	3–2	Alavés	Seville
21:00 CET (UTC+1)	Iglesias 61' (pen.), 88'; Joaquín 81'	Report	Joselu 12'; Méndez (yellow card) 23', (goal) 24'; Battaglia (yellow card) 31'; Navarro (yellow card) 77'	Stadium: Benito Villamarín; Attendance: 0 Referee: Javier Alberola Rojas

14 March 2021 27	Sevilla	1–0	Real Betis	Seville
21:00 CET (UTC+1)	En-Nesyri 27'; Ocampos (yellow card) 70'; Diego Carlos (yellow card) 72'; Jordán (yellow card) 88'	Report	Canales (yellow card) 38'; Ruibal (yellow card) 47'; Moreno (yellow card) 82'; Joaquín (yellow card) 85'; Carvalho (yellow card) 90'	Stadium: Ramón Sánchez Pizjuán; Attendance: 0 Referee: Antonio Mateu Lahoz

19 March 2021 28	Real Betis	2–0	Levante	Seville
21:00 CET (UTC+1)	Rodríguez (yellow card) 57'; Fekir 70'; Juanmi 75'; Carvalho (yellow card) 84'	Report		Stadium: Benito Villamarín; Attendance: 0 Referee: Jesús Gil Manzano

4 April 2021 29	Elche	1–1	Real Betis	Elche
16:15 CEST (UTC+2)	Milla 36'; Guti (yellow card) 73'	Report	Iglesias 14' (pen.); Carvalho (yellow card) 19'; Ruiz (yellow card) 47'; Ruibal (yellow card) 67'; Rodríguez (yellow card) 90+2'	Stadium: Martínez Valero; Attendance: 0 Referee: Adrián Cordero Vega

11 April 2021 30	Real Betis	1–1	Atlético Madrid	Seville
21:00 CEST (UTC+2)	Tello 20'	Report	Carrasco 5'	Stadium: Benito Villamarín; Attendance: 0 Referee: Guillermo Cuadra Fernández

18 April 2021 33	Real Betis	2–2	Valencia	Seville
18:30 CEST (UTC+2)	Fekir 12'; Canales 42'; Miranda (yellow card) 74'; Lainez (yellow card) 80'; Ruiz (yellow card) 84'	Report	Guedes 22'; Soler 61' (pen.); Wass (yellow card) 90+3'	Stadium: Benito Villamarín; Attendance: 0 Referee: Javier Alberola Rojas
Note: The match was originally scheduled for 28 April 2021, but was brought forward by La Liga.

21 April 2021 31	Real Betis	0–0	Athletic Bilbao	Seville
20:00 CEST (UTC+2)	Fekir (red card) 11'; Rodríguez (yellow card) 56'; Guardado (yellow card) 82'; Bravo (yellow card) 90'	Report	De Marcos (yellow card) 43'; Núñez (yellow card) 90+5'	Stadium: Benito Villamarín; Attendance: 0 Referee: David Medié Jiménez

24 April 2021 32	Real Madrid	0–0	Real Betis	Madrid
21:00 CEST (UTC+2)	Isco (yellow card) 35'	Report	Bravo (yellow card) 90+3'; Loren (yellow card) 90+3'	Stadium: Alfredo Di Stéfano; Attendance: 0 Referee: Xavier Estrada Fernández

2 May 2021 34	Valladolid	1–1	Real Betis	Valladolid
14:00 CEST (UTC+2)	Sánchez (yellow card) 49'; Weissman 68'; Janko (yellow card) 88'	Report	Ruiz (yellow card) 18'; Guardado (yellow card) 40'; Ruibal 49'; Mandi (yellow card) 90'; Fekir (yellow card) 90+2'; Emerson (yellow card) 90+2'	Stadium: José Zorrilla; Attendance: 0 Referee: Valentín Pizarro Gómez

10 May 2021 35	Real Betis	2–1	Granada	Seville
21:00 CEST (UTC+2)	Iglesias 39', 87'; Ruiz (yellow card) 55'; Joaquín (yellow card) 64'	Report	Montoro (yellow card) 12'; Puertas (yellow card) 57'; Machís 66'; Eteki (yellow card) 69'; Quini (yellow card) 90+1'	Stadium: Benito Villamarín; Attendance: 0 Referee: César Soto Grado

13 May 2021 36	Eibar	1–1	Real Betis	Eibar
20:00 CEST (UTC+2)	Diop (yellow card) 34'; Oliveira (yellow card) 38'; Correa (yellow card) 52'; Enrich 83'	Report	Guardado 4'; Emerson (yellow card) 65'	Stadium: Ipurua; Attendance: 0 Referee: Isidro Díaz de Mera Escuderos

16 May 2021 37	Real Betis	1–0	Huesca	Seville
18:30 CEST (UTC+2)	Iglesias 57' (pen.); Lainez (yellow card) 88'	Report	Rico (yellow card) 17'; Galán (yellow card) 28'; Siovas (yellow card) 59'; Sandro (yellow card) 68'; Ferreiro (yellow card) 86'; Escriche (red card) 90+4'	Stadium: Benito Villamarín; Attendance: 0 Referee: Pablo González Fuertes

22 May 2021 38	Celta Vigo	2–3	Real Betis	Vigo
18:00 CEST (UTC+2)	Suárez (yellow card) 26'; Aspas 32' (pen.), (yellow card) 67'; Domínguez (yellow card) 40'; Nolito (yellow card) 45'; Méndez 49', (yellow card) 90+6'; Solari (yellow card) 90+2'	Report	Ruiz (yellow card) 18', (goal) 73'; Guardado (yellow card) 48'; Iglesias 53' (pen.); Fekir 69'; Tello (yellow card) 75' (yellow-red card) 76'; Moreno (yellow card) 78'; Bravo (yellow card) 89'; Lainez (yellow card) 90'	Stadium: Balaídos; Attendance: 0 Referee: Jesús Gil Manzano

=== Copa del Rey ===
17 December 2020 First round	UCAM Murcia	0–2	Real Betis	Murcia
19:30 CET (UTC+1)	Tropi (yellow card) 76'; Charlie (yellow card) 90+1'	Report	Montoya 44'; Rodríguez 75'	Stadium: Estadio La Condomina; Referee: David Medié Jiménez

6 January 2021 Second round	Mutilvera	1–3	Real Betis	Aranguren
17:00 CET (UTC+1)	Briñol 5'; Gómez (yellow card) 67'	Report	Miranda 35'; Emerson 37'; Juanmi 61'	Stadium: Mutilnova; Referee: Santiago Jaime Latre

17 January 2021 Round of 32	Sporting Gijón	0–2	Real Betis	Gijón
16:00 CET (UTC+1)	Valiente (red card) 21'; Đurđević (yellow card) 31'; López (yellow card) 36'	Report	Canales 28' (pen.); Rodri 31', (yellow card) 52'	Stadium: El Molinón; Referee: Ricardo de Burgos Bengoetxea

26 January 2021 Round of 16	Real Betis	3–1 (a.e.t.)	Real Sociedad	Seville
21:00 CET (UTC+1)	Sanabria (yellow card) 13', (red card) 75'; Lainez (yellow card) 30'; Canales 78'; Iglesias 96', 111'; Ruiz (yellow card) 108'	Report	Oyarzabal 13'; Illarramendi (yellow card) 26' (yellow-red card) 48'; Merino (yellow card) 47'; Le Normand (yellow card) 110'	Stadium: Benito Villamarín; Referee: Antonio Mateu Lahoz

4 February 2021 Quarter-finals	Real Betis	1–1 (a.e.t.) (1–4 p)	Athletic Bilbao	Seville
21:00 CET (UTC+1)	Ruibal (yellow card) 55'; Carvalho (yellow card) 83'; Juanmi 84'	Report	Berchiche (yellow card) 39'; Yeray (yellow card) 42'; D. García (yellow card) 48'; Martínez (yellow card) 53'; Lekue (yellow card) 72'; R. García (yellow card) 83', (goal) 90+4'	Stadium: Benito Villamarín; Referee: Alejandro Hernández Hernández
	Penalties
	Mandi (penalty scored); Canales (penalty missed); Juanmi (penalty missed)		(penalty scored) R. García; (penalty scored) Williams; (penalty scored) Morcillo; (penalty scored) Berchiche

== Statistics ==
=== Appearances and goals ===
Last updated 22 May 2021.

No.	Pos	Nat	Player	Total		La Liga		Copa del Rey	
No.	Pos	Nat	Player	Apps	Goals	Apps	Goals	Apps	Goals
Goalkeepers
1	GK	(Spain) ESP	Joel Robles	22	0	18	0	4	0
13	GK	(Spain) ESP	Dani Martín	0	0	0	0	0	0
25	GK	(Chile) CHI	Claudio Bravo	21	0	20	0	1	0
Defenders
2	DF	(Spain) ESP	Martín Montoya	8	1	2+3	0	3	1
5	DF	(Spain) ESP	Marc Bartra	19	0	19	0	0	0
6	DF	(Spain) ESP	Víctor Ruiz	31	2	24+3	2	3+1	0
12	DF	(Brazil) BRA	Sidnei	15	1	7+4	1	3+1	0
15	DF	(Spain) ESP	Álex Moreno	25	0	20+3	0	2	0
22	DF	(Brazil) BRA	Emerson	38	2	34	1	2+2	1
23	DF	(Algeria) ALG	Aïssa Mandi	32	3	27+1	3	4	0
32	DF	(Spain) ESP	Fran Delgado	2	0	0	0	0+2	0
33	DF	(Spain) ESP	Juan Miranda	25	2	18+4	1	3	1
Midfielders
3	MF	(Spain) ESP	Víctor Camarasa	0	0	0	0	0	0
4	MF	(Ivory Coast) CIV	Paul Akouokou	13	0	4+6	0	3	0
10	MF	(Spain) ESP	Sergio Canales	34	10	28+3	8	3	2
14	MF	(Portugal) POR	William Carvalho	30	2	12+15	2	2+1	0
18	MF	(Mexico) MEX	Andrés Guardado	27	1	17+7	1	1+2	0
21	MF	(Argentina) ARG	Guido Rodríguez	38	2	34+1	1	2+1	1
28	MF	(Spain) ESP	Rodri	19	1	5+10	0	3+1	1
Forwards
7	FW	(Spain) ESP	Juanmi	20	4	5+11	2	2+2	2
8	FW	(France) FRA	Nabil Fekir	38	5	33	5	2+3	0
9	FW	(Spain) ESP	Borja Iglesias	32	13	15+13	11	2+2	2
11	FW	(Spain) ESP	Cristian Tello	33	5	12+17	5	1+3	0
16	FW	(Spain) ESP	Loren	27	1	9+17	1	0+1	0
17	FW	(Spain) ESP	Joaquín	30	2	16+11	2	1+2	0
19	FW	(France) FRA	Yassin Fekir	0	0	0	0	0	0
20	FW	(Mexico) MEX	Diego Lainez	25	0	8+13	0	0+4	0
24	FW	(Spain) ESP	Aitor Ruibal	30	2	21+7	2	1+1	0
Players who have made an appearance or had a squad number this season but have left the club either permanently or on loan
19	FW	(Paraguay) PAR	Antonio Sanabria	20	3	10+6	3	3+1	0

=== Goalscorers ===
As of 22 May 2021

Rank	Pos.	No.	Player	La Liga	Copa del Rey	Total
1	FW	9	(Spain) Borja Iglesias	11	2	13
2	MF	10	(Spain) Sergio Canales	8	2	10
2	MF	11	(Spain) Cristian Tello	5	0	5
4	FW	8	(France) Nabil Fekir	5	0	5
5	FW	7	(Spain) Juanmi	2	2	4
6	DF	23	(Algeria) Aïssa Mandi	3	0	3
6	FW	19	(Paraguay) Antonio Sanabria	3	0	3
8	FW	24	(Spain) Aitor Ruibal	2	0	2
8	FW	17	(Spain) Joaquín	2	0	2
8	DF	6	(Spain) Víctor Ruiz	2	0	2
8	MF	14	(Portugal) William Carvalho	2	0	2
8	MF	21	(Argentina) Guido Rodríguez	1	1	2
8	DF	33	(Spain) Juan Miranda	1	1	2
8	DF	22	(Brazil) Emerson	1	1	2
15	MF	18	(Mexico) Andrés Guardado	1	0	1
15	DF	2	(Spain) Martín Montoya	0	1	1
15	FW	16	(Spain) Loren	1	0	1
15	MF	28	(Spain) Rodri	0	1	1
Total				50	11	61
