= Juan Miranda (footballer) =

Spanish footballer (born 2000)

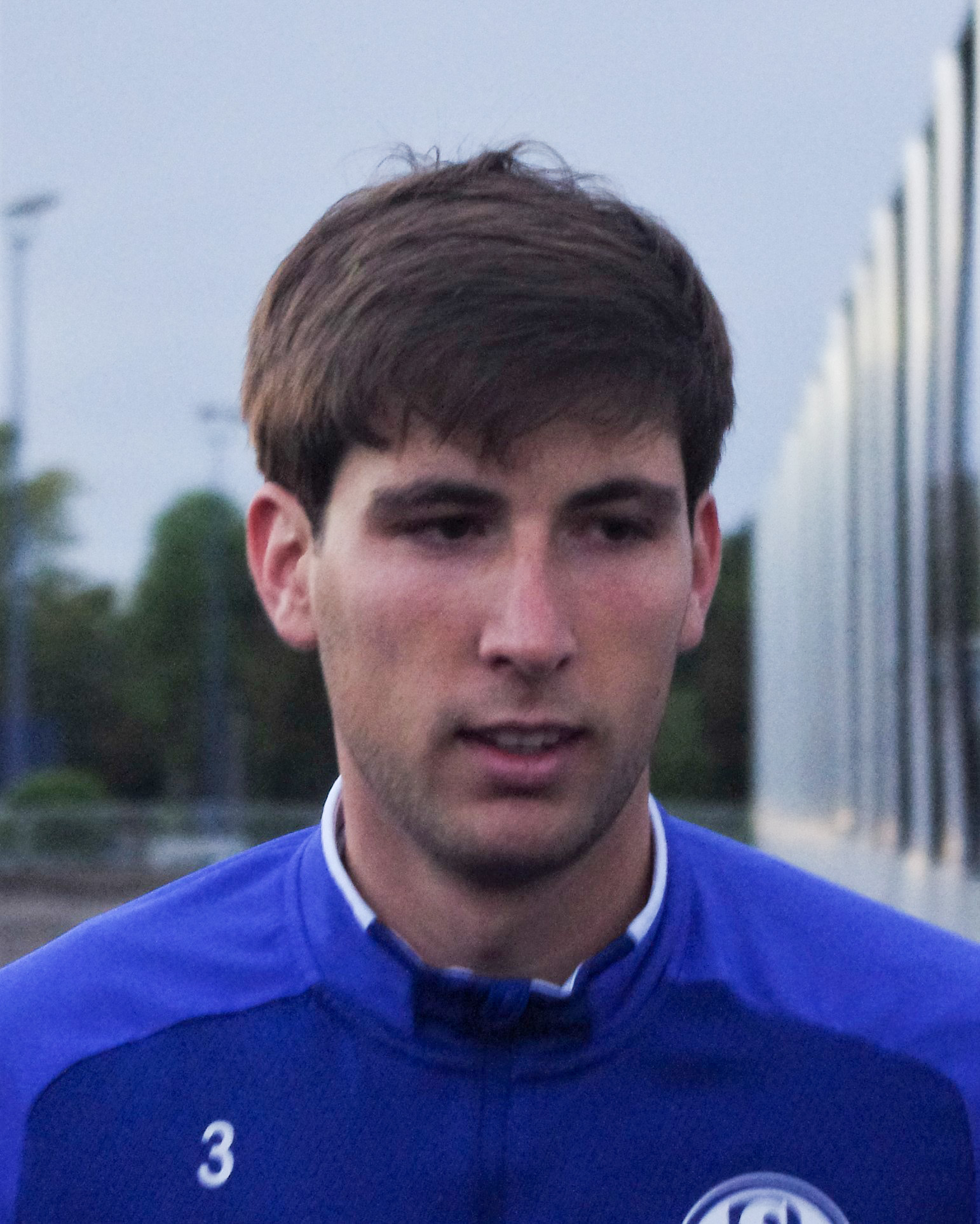
- Miranda with Schalke 04 in 2019

Personal information
- Full name: Juan Miranda González
- Date of birth: 19 January 2000 (age 26)
- Place of birth: Olivares, Spain
- Height: 1.85 m (6 ft 1 in)
- Position: Left-back

Team information
- Current team: Bologna
- Number: 33

Youth career
- 2008–2014: Betis
- 2014–2018: Barcelona

Senior career*
Years	Team	Apps	(Gls)
2017–2020	Barcelona B	30	(2)
2018–2021	Barcelona	1	(0)
2019–2020	→ Schalke 04 (loan)	11	(0)
2020–2021	→ Betis (loan)	22	(1)
2021–2024	Betis	59	(4)
2024–	Bologna	71	(1)

International career^{‡}
2016	Spain U16	3	(0)
2016–2017	Spain U17	22	(3)
2018	Spain U18	4	(0)
2017–2019	Spain U19	19	(2)
2019–2023	Spain U21	24	(5)
2021–2024	Spain Olympic	11	(0)
2021	Spain	1	(1)
Medal record
Men's football
Representing Spain
Olympic Games
Gold medal – first place	2024 Paris
Silver medal – second place	2020 Tokyo
UEFA European Under-21 Championship
Runner-up	2023 Georgia–Romania
UEFA European Under-19 Championship
Winner	2019 Armenia
FIFA U-17 World Cup
Runner-up	2017 India
UEFA European Under-17 Championship
Winner	2017 Croatia
- * Club domestic league appearances and goals as of 20:05, 28 October 2026 (UTC) ‡ National team caps and goals as of 23:34, 9 August 2024 (UTC)

Juan Miranda González (born 19 January 2000) is a Spanish professional footballer who plays as a left-back for Serie A club Bologna.

== Club career ==
=== Barcelona ===
Born in Olivares, Seville, Andalusia, Miranda joined Barcelona's youth setup in June 2014, from Real Betis. After progressing through the youth setup, he made his senior debut with the reserves on 19 August 2017, starting in a 2–1 away win against Real Valladolid in the Segunda División.

Miranda scored his first senior goal on 27 January 2018, netting the second in a 3–0 home win against Granada. On 11 December, he made his UEFA Champions League debut for the first team in a 1–1 draw against Tottenham Hotspur.

==== Loan to Schalke 04 ====
On 30 August 2019, Miranda joined Bundesliga club FC Schalke 04 on a two-year loan deal. On 15 December 2019, he made his Bundesliga debut in a 1–0 home win against Eintracht Frankfurt when he came on for the injured Weston McKennie in the 13th minute. On 1 July 2020, he returned to Barcelona as the loan was ended early.

==== Loan to Betis ====
On 5 October 2020, Miranda joined La Liga side Real Betis on loan for the 2020–21 campaign.

=== Betis ===
On 1 June 2021, Barcelona announced that the clause in Miranda's contract to automatically extend it until 2023 would not trigger, and that he would join Real Betis permanently once his loan spell ended. Barça will reserve 40% of the rights of any future sale, and a right to first refusal on re-signing Miranda.

On 23 April 2022, Miranda scored the winning goal in the penalty shootout for Real Betis in the 2022 Copa del Rey final.

=== Bologna ===
On 3 July 2024, Miranda moved to Serie A, joining Bologna on a permanent deal.

== International career ==
Miranda represented Spain at various youth levels. With the under-17 and under-19 teams, he was part of the squads that won the 2017 UEFA European Under-17 Championship and the 2019 UEFA European Under-19 Championship. He was also named in the squad that finished as runners-up at the 2017 FIFA U-17 World Cup.

At under-21 level, Miranda was selected for the 2023 UEFA European Under-21 Championship, where he was named in the Team of the Tournament.

In 2024, Miranda received a call-up to the Spain U23 for the 2024 Summer Olympics as one of the three overaged players in the squad. He later won a gold medal after Spain defeated France 5–3 in the final.

Due to the isolation of some national team players following the positive COVID-19 test of Sergio Busquets, Spain's under-21 squad were called up for the international friendly against Lithuania on 8 June 2021. Miranda made his senior debut in the match and scored as Spain won 4–0.

== Career statistics ==
=== Club ===
As of match played 28 October 2026

Appearances and goals by club, season and competition
Club	Season	League			National cup		Europe		Other		Total	
Club	Season	Division	Apps	Goals	Apps	Goals	Apps	Goals	Apps	Goals	Apps	Goals
Barcelona B	2017–18	Segunda División	7	1	—		—		—		7	1
Barcelona B	2018–19	Segunda División B	23	1	—		—		—		23	1
Barcelona B	Total		30	2	—		—		—		30	2
Barcelona	2018–19	La Liga	0	0	3	0	1 (Note: Appearances in UEFA Champions League)	0	0	0	4	0
Schalke 04 (loan)	2019–20	Bundesliga	11	0	1	0	—		—		12	0
Real Betis (loan)	2020–21	La Liga	22	1	3	1	—		—		25	2
Real Betis	2021–22	La Liga	13	0	3	0	7 (Note: Appearances in UEFA Europa League)	1	—		23	1
Real Betis	2022–23	La Liga	21	3	2	0	7	0	1 (Note: Appearance in Supercopa de España)	0	31	3
Real Betis	2023–24	La Liga	25	1	2	0	5 (Note: Three appearances in UEFA Europa League, two appearances in UEFA Europa Conference League)	1	—		32	2
Real Betis	Betis total		81	5	10	1	19	2	1	0	111	8
Bologna	2024–25	Serie A	31	0	2	0	5	0	—		38	0
Bologna	2025–26	Serie A	32	1	1	0	10	0	2 (Note: Appearances in Supercoppa Italiana)	0	45	1
Bologna	2026–27	Serie A	8	0	0	0	—		—		8	0
Bologna	Total		71	1	3	0	15	0	2	0	91	1
Career total			193	8	17	1	35	2	3	0	248	11

=== International ===
As of match played 8 June 2021

Appearances and goals by national team and year
National team	Year	Apps	Goals
Spain	2021	1	1
Total		1	1

As of match played 8 June 2021
Scores and results list Spain's goal tally first, score column indicates score after each Miranda goal.

List of international goals scored by Juan Miranda
No.	Date	Venue	Opponent	Score	Result	Competition
1	8 June 2021	Butarque, Leganés, Spain	Lithuania	3–0	4–0	Friendly

== Honours ==
Barcelona U19

- UEFA Youth League: 2017–18

Barcelona

- Supercopa de España: 2018

Real Betis

- Copa del Rey: 2021–22

Bologna

- Coppa Italia: 2024–25

Spain U17

- UEFA European Under-17 Championship: 2017

Spain U18

- Mediterranean Games: 2018

Spain U19

- UEFA European Under-19 Championship: 2019

Spain U23

- Summer Olympic gold medal: 2024; silver medal: 2020

Individual

- UEFA European Under-19 Championship Team of the Tournament: 2019
- UEFA European Under-21 Championship Team of the Tournament: 2023
- The Athletic Serie A Team of the Season: 2024–25
