= Abde Ezzalzouli =

Moroccan footballer (born 2001)

Abdessamad Ezzalzouli
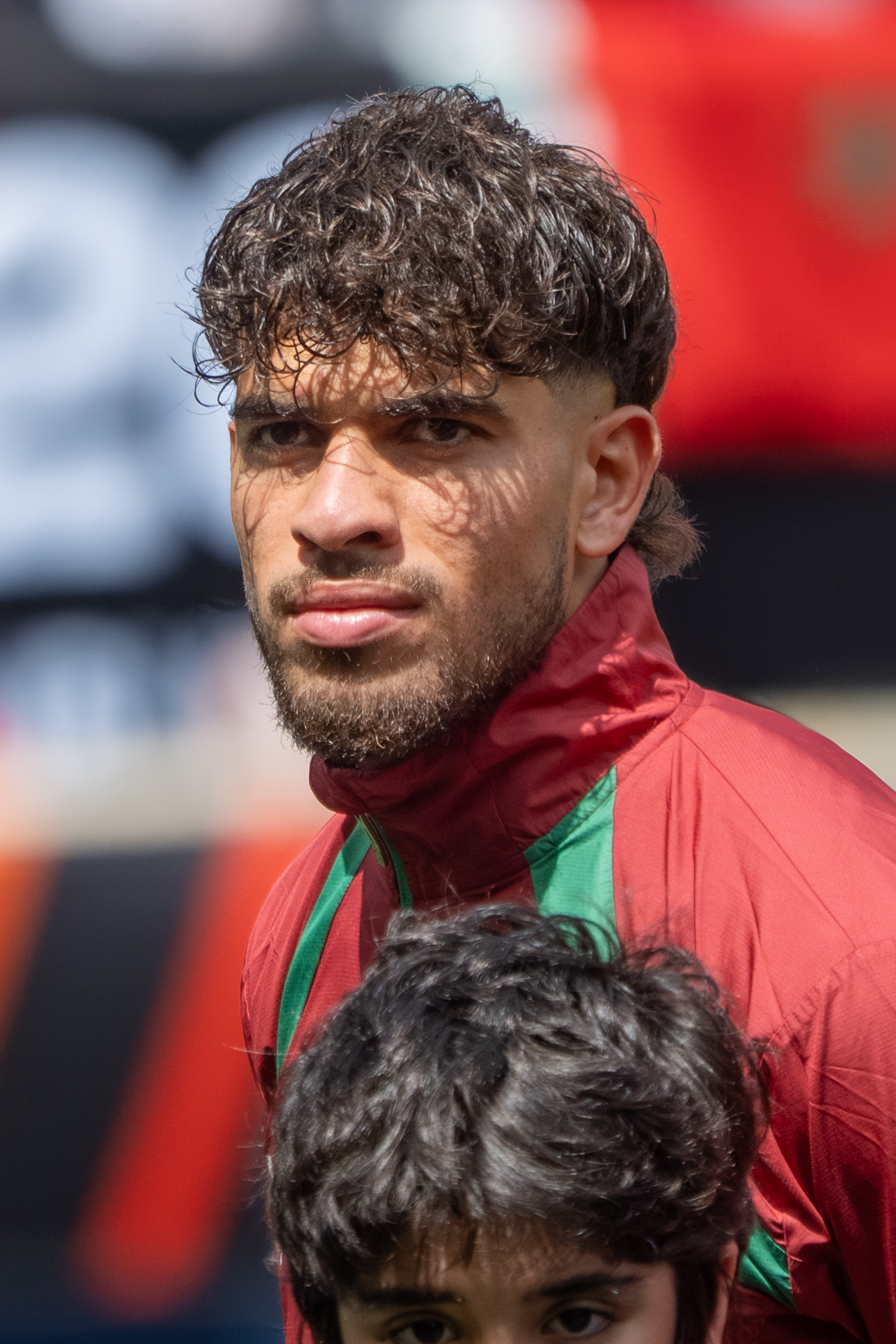
- Ezzalzouli with Morocco in 2026

Personal information
- Full name: Abdessamad Ezzalzouli
- Date of birth: 17 December 2001 (age 24)
- Place of birth: Beni Mellal, Morocco
- Height: 1.77 m (5 ft 10 in)
- Position: Left winger

Team information
- Current team: Betis
- Number: 10

Youth career
- Peña Ilicitana Raval
- Promesas Elche
- –2019: Hércules

Senior career*
Years	Team	Apps	(Gls)
2019–2021	Hércules B	25	(5)
2019–2021	Hércules	21	(2)
2021–2022	Barcelona B	21	(3)
2021–2023	Barcelona	12	(1)
2022–2023	→ Osasuna (loan)	28	(4)
2023–	Betis	97	(16)

International career^{‡}
2019–2021	Morocco U20	5	(2)
2023–	Morocco U23	11	(5)
2022–	Morocco	40	(3)
Medal record
Men's football
Representing Morocco
Africa Cup of Nations
Winner	2025 Morocco
U-23 Africa Cup of Nations
Winner	2023 Morocco
Olympic Games
Bronze medal – third place	2024 Paris	Team
- * Club domestic league appearances and goals as of 15:19, 21 November 2026 (UTC) ‡ National team caps and goals as of 23:28, 4 October 2026 (UTC)

Abdessamad "Abde" Ezzalzouli (Note: Arabic: عبد الصمد الزلزولي) (born 17 December 2001), sometimes known as Ez Abde, is a Moroccan professional footballer who plays as a left winger for La Liga club Real Betis and the Morocco national team.

Ezzalzouli began his professional career with Hércules in 2019 before signing for Barcelona in 2021. Following a loan move to Osasuna, he joined Real Betis in 2023, helping the club to its first ever European final.

Ezzalzouli made his international debut for Morocco in 2022, after previously being capped by the nation's youth teams at under-20 level. He was chosen in the Moroccan squads for the FIFA World Cup in 2022 and the Africa Cup of Nations in 2023 and 2025.

== Early life ==
Born in Beni Mellal Morocco, Ezzalzouli moved to Spain with his family at the age of seven to live and started his football youth career in the neighborhood of Carrús, in the city of Elche.

== Club career ==
=== Hércules ===
Ezzalzouli was part of the youth academies for numerous clubs in the Elche area, including Peña Ilicitana Raval CF and Promesas Elche CF. He trialled at Elche CF, the main club in his hometown, but was not offered a place in their academy. Hércules B coach Antonio Moreno Domínguez offered him a contract, and Ezzalzouli subsequently joined the club in the neighbouring city of Alicante, and began his senior career with the B-team in 2019.

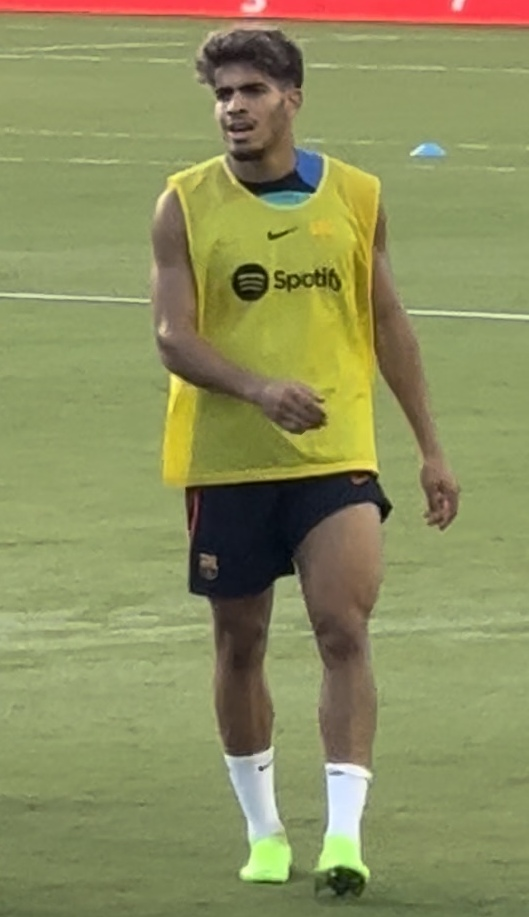
Ezzalzouli training with Barcelona in 2022

=== Barcelona ===
Ezzalzouli transferred to Barcelona B on 31 August 2021. He made his professional debut with Barcelona in a 1–1 La Liga draw with Alavés on 30 October 2021, coming on as a substitute in the 80th minute. Ezzalzouli thus became the first Moroccan-born player to feature for Barça's first team. He scored his first goal for Barcelona against Osasuna in a 2–2 draw.

==== Loan to Osasuna ====
“Abde’s game is spectacular".

— Xavi.

In September 2022, he renewed his contract with Barcelona until 2026 and was ensuingly loaned to Osasuna. On 4 September, he made his first appearance for Osasuna against Rayo Vallecano after being subbed in the 81st minute, he managed to assist the winning goal in that game, which ended in a 2–1 victory.

On 26 January 2023, Ezzalzouli scored his first goal for the club in a 2–1 victory against Sevilla in the 2022–23 Copa del Rey quarter-finals. He scored his first league goal exactly one month later, in a 3–2 win against the same opponent.

=== Betis ===
On 1 September 2023, Ezzalzouli signed a five-year contract with fellow La Liga club Real Betis, with the transfer being reportedly worth €7.5 million, plus a buy-back option in favor of Barcelona. On 9 September 2023, Ezzalzouli made his debut in a 5–0 loss against Barcelona. On 1 October 2023, Ezzalzouli scored his first goal for the team in a 3–0 victory against Valencia. On 1 November 2023, Ezzalzouli was nominated for the 2023 African Young Player of the Year by CAF.

On 8 May 2025, Ezzalzouli scored an extra-time goal in a 2–2 second-leg away draw against Fiorentina to secure Betis' place in the UEFA Conference League final, the club's first final in a UEFA competition, by winning 4–3 on aggregate. In the final against Chelsea, he scored to give Betis the lead, though his side were eventually defeated 4–1.

== International career ==
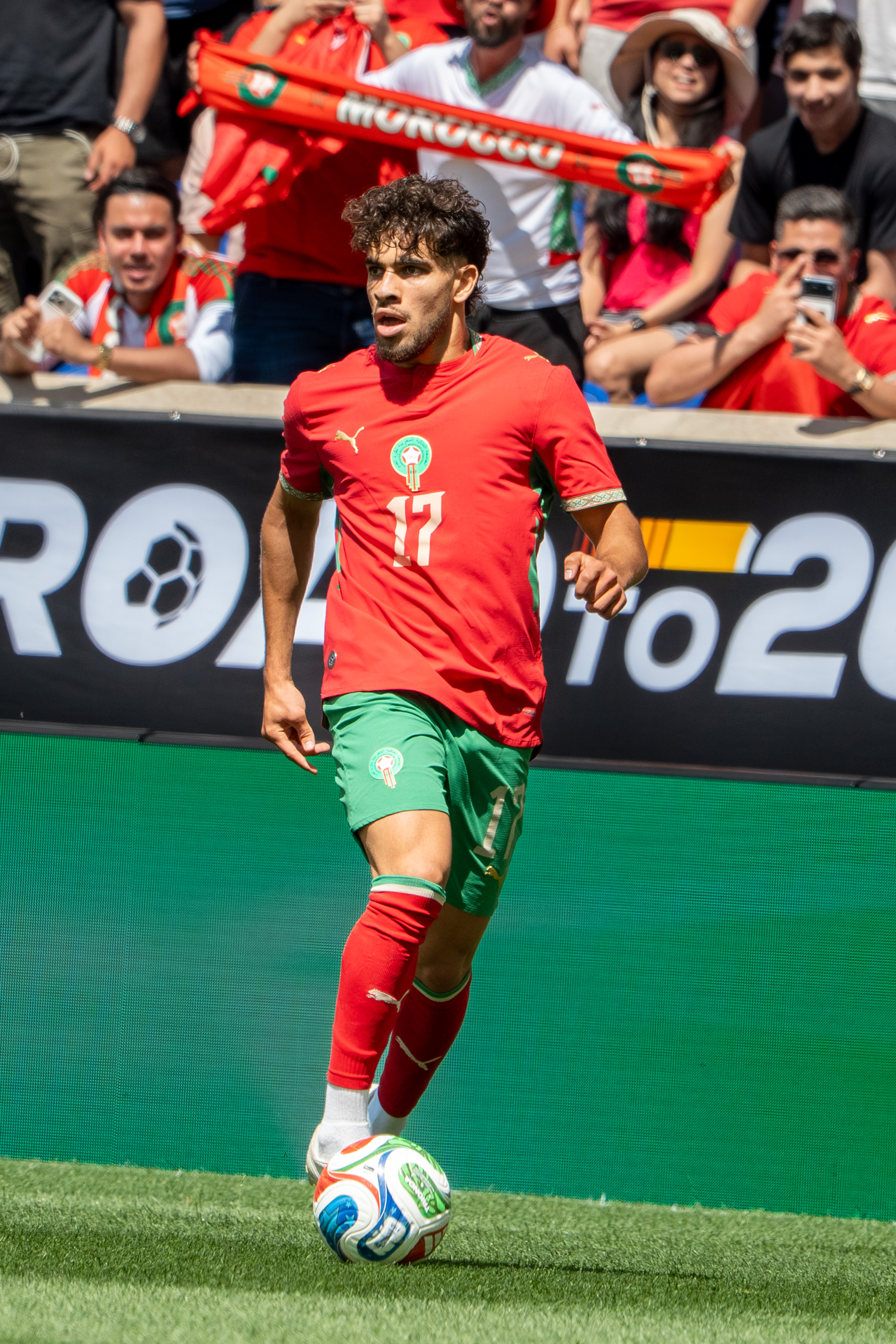
Ezzalzouli with Morocco in 2026

Ezzalzouli represented the Morocco under-20 team at the 2020 Arab Cup U-20, scoring two goals in five games. On 20 December 2021, Abdessamad rejected Vahid Halilhodžić invitation to represent Morocco national team in the 2021 Africa Cup of Nations to focus on his club. He obtained Spanish citizenship in December 2021, holding dual Moroccan and Spanish citizenship.

On 17 March 2022, Ezzalzouli was listed in the 26-man squad to face DR Congo in the 2022 FIFA World Cup qualification – CAF third round.

In September 2022, Ezzalzouli was called up to join the Morocco national team. He played his first match in a friendly against Chile at the RCDE Stadium in Cornellà de Llobregat, which ended in a 2–0 victory.

On 10 November 2022, he was named in Morocco's 26-man squad for the 2022 FIFA World Cup in Qatar.

In June 2023, he was included in the squad for the 2023 U-23 Africa Cup of Nations, hosted by Morocco itself; named as the team captain, he went on to score three goals and three assists in four matches, as the Atlas Lions won their first title and qualified for the 2024 Summer Olympics.

Ezzalzouli was selected for Morocco's squad to compete in the men's football at the 2024 Summer Olympics.

On 11 December 2025, Ezzalzouli was called up to the Morocco squad for the 2025 Africa Cup of Nations.

He was part of the national squad for the 2026 FIFA World Cup but on 11 June 2026 he was sent home after failing to recover from an injury.

== Career statistics ==
=== Club ===
As of match played 21 November 2026

Appearances and goals by club, season and competition
Club	Season	League			Copa del Rey		Europe		Other		Total	
Club	Season	Division	Apps	Goals	Apps	Goals	Apps	Goals	Apps	Goals	Apps	Goals
Hércules B	2019–20	Tercera División	17	5	—		—		—		17	5
Hércules B	2020–21	Tercera División	8	0	—		—		—		8	0
Hércules B	Total		25	5	—		—		—		25	5
Hércules	2019–20	Segunda División B	4	0	1	0	—		—		5	0
Hércules	2020–21	Segunda División B	17	2	0	0	—		—		17	2
Hércules	Total		21	2	1	0	—		—		22	2
Barcelona B	2021–22	Primera División RFEF	21	3	—		—		—		21	3
Barcelona	2021–22	La Liga	10	1	1	0	0	0	1 (Note: Appearance in Supercopa de España)	0	12	1
Barcelona	2023–24	La Liga	2	0	—		—		—		2	0
Barcelona	Total		12	1	1	0	0	0	1	0	14	1
Osasuna (loan)	2022–23	La Liga	28	4	6	2	—		—		34	6
Betis	2023–24	La Liga	26	1	2	3	8 (Note: Six appearances and one goal in UEFA Europa League, two appearances in UEFA Europa Conference League)	1	—		36	5
Betis	2024–25	La Liga	32	2	2	1	15 (Note: Appearances in UEFA Conference League)	6	—		49	9
Betis	2025–26	La Liga	29	10	2	1	12 (Note: Appearances in UEFA Europa League)	4	—		43	15
Betis	2026–27	La Liga	10	3	0	0	3 (Note: Appearances in UEFA Champions League)	1	—		13	4
Betis	Total		97	16	6	5	38	12	—		141	33
Career total			203	31	14	7	38	12	1	0	256	50

=== International ===
As of match played 4 October 2026

Appearances and goals by national team and year
National team	Year	Apps	Goals
Morocco	2022	5	0
Morocco	2023	6	0
Morocco	2024	10	2
Morocco	2025	8	0
Morocco	2026	11	1
Total		40	3

Morocco score listed first, score column indicates score after each Ezzalzouli goal.

List of international goals scored by Abde Ezzalzouli
No.	Date	Venue	Opponent	Score	Result	Competition
1	12 October 2024	Honor Stadium, Oujda, Morocco	Central African Republic	1–0	5–0	2025 Africa Cup of Nations qualification
2	15 October 2024	Honor Stadium, Oujda, Morocco	Central African Republic	4–0	4–0	2025 Africa Cup of Nations qualification
3	4 October 2026	Tangier Grand Stadium, Tangier, Morocco	Mali	1–0	1–1	Friendly

== Honours ==
Osasuna

- Copa del Rey runner-up: 2022–23

Real Betis

- UEFA Conference League runner-up: 2024–25

Morocco U23

- U-23 Africa Cup of Nations: 2023
- Summer Olympics bronze medal: 2024

Morocco

- Africa Cup of Nations: 2025

Individual

- U-23 Africa Cup of Nations Golden Boot: 2023
- U-23 Africa Cup of Nations Team of the Tournament: 2023

Orders

- Order of the Throne: 2022
