= Borja Iglesias =

Spanish footballer (born 1993)

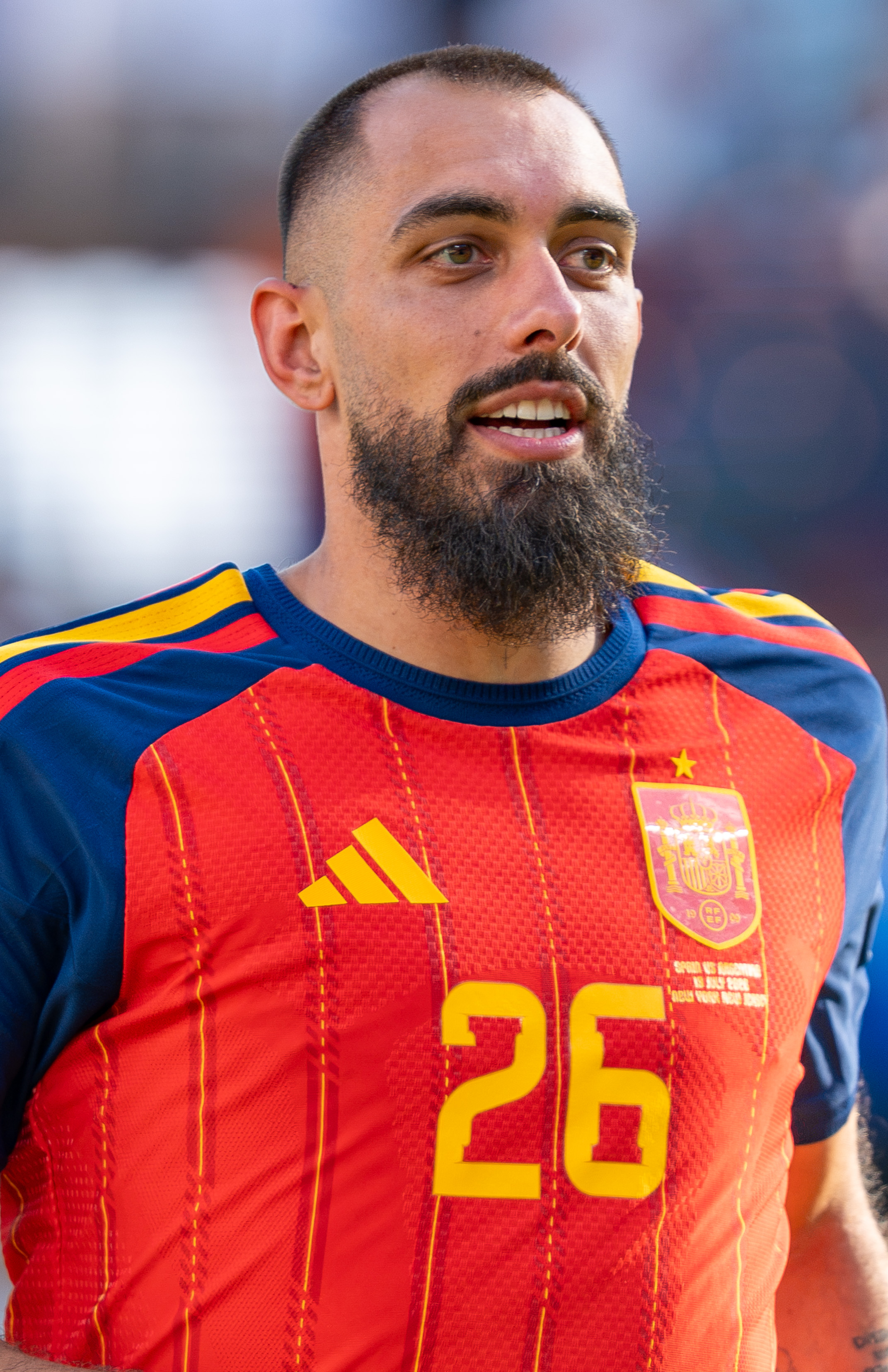
- Iglesias with Spain in 2026

Personal information
- Full name: Borja Iglesias Quintas
- Date of birth: 17 January 1993 (age 33)
- Place of birth: Santiago de Compostela, Spain
- Height: 1.87 m (6 ft 2 in)
- Position: Striker

Team information
- Current team: Celta
- Number: 7

Youth career
- 2003–2007: Compostela
- 2007–2010: Valencia
- 2010–2011: Roda
- 2011–2012: Villarreal

Senior career*
| Years | Team | Apps | (Gls) |
| 2012–2013 | Villarreal C | 29 | (11) |
| 2013–2017 | Celta B | 144 | (73) |
| 2014–2018 | Celta | 1 | (0) |
| 2017–2018 | → Zaragoza (loan) | 39 | (22) |
| 2018–2019 | Espanyol | 37 | (17) |
| 2019–2025 | Betis | 142 | (39) |
| 2024 | → Bayer Leverkusen (loan) | 7 | (0) |
| 2024–2025 | → Celta (loan) | 37 | (11) |
| 2025– | Celta | 38 | (14) |

International career^{‡}
| 2022– | Spain | 9 | (0) |
Medal record
Men's football
Representing Spain
FIFA World Cup
| Winner | 2026 Canada–Mexico–US |
- * Club domestic league appearances and goals as of 20:58, 11 October 2026 (UTC) ‡ National team caps and goals as of 22:01, 6 July 2026 (UTC)

Borja Iglesias Quintas (Spanish pronunciation: [ˈboɾxajˈɣlesjas]; born 17 January 1993) is a Spanish professional footballer who plays as a striker for La Liga club Celta and the Spain national team.

Developed at Celta, where he played mainly in the reserves initially, he achieved totals of over 250 La Liga appearances and 80 goals for that club, Espanyol and Betis. He won the 2021–22 Copa del Rey with the latter.

Iglesias made his full debut for Spain in 2022 and was named in the squad for the 2026 FIFA World Cup, winning the tournament.

== Club career ==
=== Villarreal ===
Born in Santiago de Compostela, Province of A Coruña, Galicia, Iglesias began playing football as a toddler in his local primary school, until he was recruited by Compostela at age 10. He eventually graduated from Villarreal's youth setup after stints at Roda and Valencia, starting his senior career in 2012 with the former's C team in the Tercera División.

=== Celta ===
Iglesias joined Celta de Vigo on 9 July 2013, signing a two-year deal with an option for a further three and being assigned to the reserves in the Segunda División B. On 3 January 2015 he made his first-team – and La Liga – debut, coming on as a 78th-minute substitute for Santi Mina in a 1–0 away loss against Sevilla.

On 11 December 2016, after scoring a brace in a 3–2 away defeat to Caudal, Iglesias became Celta B's all-time top scorer with 53 goals, surpassing Goran Marić. He topped the third-tier charts at 32, being essential as his team sealed a play-off berth.

On 6 July 2017, Iglesias was loaned to Segunda División club Real Zaragoza for one year. He scored his first goal for his new team on 27 August, the equaliser through a penalty kick in a 1–1 home draw with Granada. Additionally, he netted braces against Córdoba, Sevilla Atlético, Real Valladolid and Osasuna, to reach 15 goals by March and finish the season as the division's joint-third highest scorer on 22. Earlier on 24 September, he was sent off just before half time in a 1–1 draw with Gimnàstic de Tarragona at La Romareda for what the referee considered an aggression towards goalkeeper Stole Dimitrievski.

=== Espanyol ===
On 9 July 2018, Iglesias signed a four-year contract with Espanyol with a buyout clause of €28 million. He made his official debut for the club on 18 August, starting in a 1–1 home draw against former club Celta. In his next appearance, he helped the hosts defeat Valencia 2–0 after profiting from a Cristiano Piccini mistake midway through the second half.

Iglesias scored three goals over two legs in an aggregate 7–1 win over Stjarnan in the second qualifying round of the UEFA Europa League in late July and early August 2019.

=== Betis ===
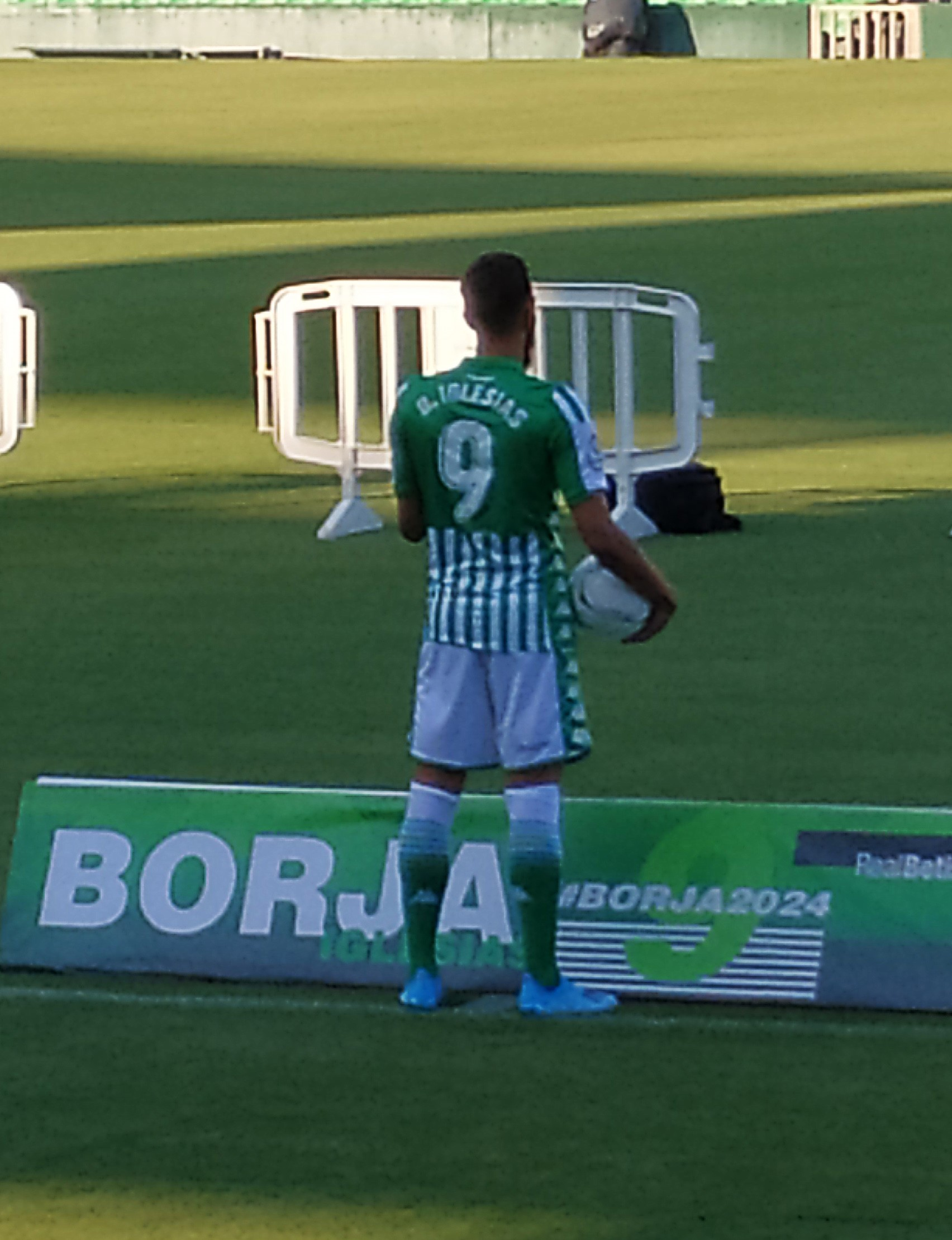
Iglesias being presented by Betis in August 2019

On 14 August 2019, Iglesias moved to Real Betis after agreeing to a five-year deal for a fee of €28 million, reuniting with his former Espanyol manager Rubi. He struggled with just three goals as the team finished 15th in his debut campaign, and received a red card on 20 February at the end of a goalless draw at Leganés for pushing an opposition coach. In 2020–21, he contributed 13 goals – 11 in the league – to clinch a Europa League place.

On 3 March 2022, in the second leg of the semi-finals of the Copa del Rey against Rayo Vallecano, Iglesias scored in stoppage time to ensure his team a 1–1 draw and a spot in the final. In the decisive match on 23 April, he opened a 1–1 draw with Valencia as his team won on penalties; he also topped the tournament's individual charts at five, and was the final's most valuable player.

Iglesias opened the 2022–23 season with six goals in six games, earning himself the accolade of La Liga Player of the Month for August. On 6 November, both he and teammate Nabil Fekir (as well as Gonzalo Montiel for the opposition) received straight red cards in an eventual 1–1 home draw with Sevilla in the Seville derby.

Iglesias scored only twice from 18 appearances in the first part of 2023–24, failing to find the net in the domestic league. On 27 January 2024, he was sent on loan to Bundesliga club Bayer Leverkusen until the end of the campaign, with a reported option to buy for €8 million; he arrived to cover for the injured Victor Boniface. He totalled ten games during his spell, winning a domestic double but failing to score in the process.

=== Return to Celta ===
On 19 July 2024, Iglesias returned to Celta on a season-long loan. He scored a squad-best 11 goals while veteran Iago Aspas added ten, and they qualified for the Europa League after finishing seventh; this included his first hat-trick in the top division on 19 April 2025, a fruitless one as it was in a 4–3 away loss against eventual champions Barcelona.

Iglesias signed a permanent two-year contract with the club on 12 August 2025, with an option for an additional year.

== International career ==
In September 2022, Iglesias and Nico Williams were called up for the first time to the Spain national team, ahead of UEFA Nations League games with Switzerland and Portugal. He made his debut against the former, in a 2–1 loss in Zaragoza. Despite his 20 goals making him the top scoring national player of the calendar year, he was overlooked for the 2022 FIFA World Cup – the first Spaniard since 1994 to be in this position.

In August 2023, in response to the Royal Spanish Football Federation president Luis Rubiales non-consensually kissing Spanish midfielder Jennifer Hermoso during the Women's World Cup medal ceremony, Iglesias announced he would boycott playing for Spain until Rubiales resigned. He returned to the squads in October 2025, and was called up by Luis de la Fuente for the 2026 World Cup finals. The 33-year-old made his debut in the competition on 6 July, playing injury time of the 1–0 victory over Portugal in the round of 16 in place of Mikel Oyarzabal.

== Personal life ==
Iglesias was nicknamed Panda, after the song of the same name by rapper Desiigner. He received attention for painting his fingernails black in support of Black Lives Matter in 2020; his gesture was also a statement against homophobia, for which he was praised by the actor Brays Efe.

In January 2026, after a match against Sevilla, Iglesias was subjected to homophobic slurs and hateful chanting in a car park while giving his shirt to a fan. In response, Celta launched a campaign titled "Against Hate, Together." During the subsequent home match against Rayo Vallecano, over 5,000 supporters, the club's coaching staff and president Marián Mouriño all painted their nails in solidarity with the player, who clarified that he is heterosexual, stating his goal is to help "create a safe space" in men's football.

When asked about his political opinions, Iglesias said "Footballers tend to lean a little bit to the right because sometimes we value that economic policy. For me, for example, that's not the only thing worth anything. What I'm trying to say is, I prefer to pay more to live in a country where I like what they do with that money". In September 2025, he denounced the Gaza genocide. He expressed surprise that "more importance is accorded to the cancellation of a sporting event than to a genocide," specifically addressing complaints regarding pro-Palestine protests that had impacted stages of the Vuelta a España cycling race; he defended his stance by stating that "sometimes, it is necessary to stop and claim what is mandatory, namely human rights and respect, which are often lacking," and emphasized the need to "take conscience of the injustices that exist in the world.".

== Career statistics ==
=== Club ===
As of match played 11 October 2026

Appearances and goals by club, season and competition
| Club | Season | League | | | National cup (Note: Includes Copa del Rey, DFB-Pokal) | | Europe | | Other | | Total | |
| Club | Season | Division | Apps | Goals | Apps | Goals | Apps | Goals | Apps | Goals | Apps | Goals |
|---|---|---|---|---|---|---|---|---|---|---|---|---|
| Villarreal C | 2012–13 | Tercera División | 29 | 11 | — | | — | | — | | 29 | 11 |
| Celta B | 2013–14 | Segunda División B | 35 | 12 | — | | — | | — | | 35 | 12 |
| Celta B | 2014–15 | Segunda División B | 36 | 17 | — | | — | | — | | 36 | 17 |
| Celta B | 2015–16 | Segunda División B | 36 | 12 | — | | — | | — | | 36 | 12 |
| Celta B | 2016–17 | Segunda División B | 37 | 32 | — | | — | | 2 (Note: Appearances in Segunda División B play-offs) | 2 | 39 | 34 |
| Celta B | Total | | 144 | 73 | — | | — | | 2 | 2 | 146 | 75 |
| Celta | 2014–15 | La Liga | 1 | 0 | 0 | 0 | — | | — | | 1 | 0 |
| Celta | 2015–16 | La Liga | 0 | 0 | 1 | 0 | — | | — | | 1 | 0 |
| Celta | 2016–17 | La Liga | 0 | 0 | 0 | 0 | — | | — | | 0 | 0 |
| Celta | Total | | 1 | 0 | 1 | 0 | — | | — | | 2 | 0 |
| Zaragoza (loan) | 2017–18 | Segunda División | 39 | 22 | 2 | 1 | — | | 2 (Note: Appearances in La Liga play-offs) | 0 | 43 | 23 |
| Espanyol | 2018–19 | La Liga | 37 | 17 | 6 | 3 | — | | — | | 43 | 20 |
| Espanyol | 2019–20 | La Liga | — | | — | | 3 (Note: Appearances in UEFA Europa League) | 3 | — | | 3 | 3 |
| Espanyol | Total | | 37 | 17 | 6 | 3 | 3 | 3 | — | | 46 | 23 |
| Betis | 2019–20 | La Liga | 35 | 3 | 2 | 0 | — | | — | | 37 | 3 |
| Betis | 2020–21 | La Liga | 28 | 11 | 4 | 2 | — | | — | | 32 | 13 |
| Betis | 2021–22 | La Liga | 33 | 10 | 8 | 5 | 10 | 4 | — | | 51 | 19 |
| Betis | 2022–23 | La Liga | 35 | 15 | 1 | 0 | 6 | 0 | 1 (Note: Appearance in Supercopa de España) | 0 | 43 | 15 |
| Betis | 2023–24 | La Liga | 11 | 0 | 1 | 1 | 6 | 1 | — | | 18 | 2 |
| Betis | Total | | 142 | 39 | 16 | 8 | 22 | 5 | 1 | 0 | 181 | 52 |
| Bayer Leverkusen (loan) | 2023–24 | Bundesliga | 7 | 0 | 1 | 0 | 2 | 0 | — | | 10 | 0 |
| Celta (loan) | 2024–25 | La Liga | 37 | 11 | 2 | 0 | — | | — | | 39 | 11 |
| Celta | 2025–26 | La Liga | 35 | 14 | 2 | 2 | 13 | 2 | — | | 50 | 18 |
| Celta | 2026–27 | La Liga | 3 | 0 | 0 | 0 | 1 | 0 | — | | 4 | 0 |
| Celta | Total | | 75 | 25 | 4 | 2 | 14 | 2 | — | | 93 | 29 |
| Career total | | | 474 | 187 | 30 | 14 | 41 | 10 | 5 | 2 | 550 | 213 |

=== International ===
As of match played 6 July 2026

Appearances and goals by national team and year
| National team | Year | Apps | Goals |
|---|---|---|---|
| Spain | 2022 | 1 | 0 |
| Spain | 2023 | 1 | 0 |
| Spain | 2024 | 0 | 0 |
| Spain | 2025 | 3 | 0 |
| Spain | 2026 | 4 | 0 |
| Total | | 9 | 0 |

== Honours ==
Betis

- Copa del Rey: 2021–22

Bayer Leverkusen

- Bundesliga: 2023–24
- DFB-Pokal: 2023–24

Spain

- FIFA World Cup: 2026

Individual

- La Liga Player of the Month: August 2022
