= Guido Rodríguez =

Argentine footballer (born 1994)

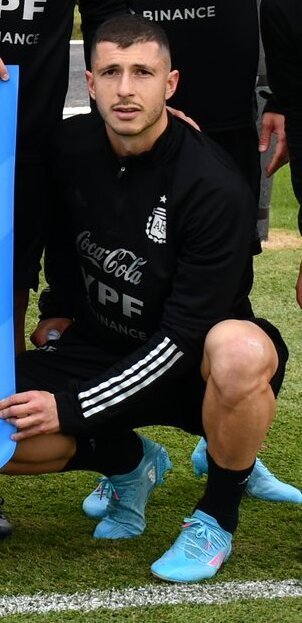
- Rodríguez with Argentina in 2022

Personal information
- Full name: Guido Rodríguez
- Date of birth: 12 April 1994 (age 32)
- Place of birth: Sáenz Peña, Buenos Aires, Argentina
- Height: 1.85 m (6 ft 1 in)
- Position: Defensive midfielder

Team information
- Current team: Valencia
- Number: 2

Youth career
- River Plate

Senior career*
Years	Team	Apps	(Gls)
2014–2016	River Plate	16	(1)
2016	→ Defensa y Justicia (loan)	15	(0)
2016–2017	Tijuana	39	(5)
2017–2020	América	103	(12)
2020–2024	Real Betis	139	(6)
2024–2026	West Ham United	29	(0)
2026–	Valencia	16	(4)

International career^{‡}
2017–2024	Argentina	30	(1)
Medal record
Men's football
Representing Argentina
FIFA World Cup
Winner	2022 Qatar
Copa América
Winner	2021 Brazil
Winner	2024 United States
Third place	2019 Brazil
CONMEBOL–UEFA Cup of Champions
Winner	2022 England
- * Club domestic league appearances and goals as of 14:05, 27 May 2026 (UTC) ‡ National team caps and goals as of 29 June 2024 (UTC)

Guido Rodríguez (born 12 April 1994) is an Argentine professional footballer who plays as a defensive midfielder for La Liga club Valencia.

== Club career ==
=== River Plate ===
Rodríguez began his career with River Plate. On 9 October 2014, Rodríguez made his debut for River Plate in a Copa Argentina quarter-final game against Rosario Central. He stayed with the club until 2016. He struggled for playing time, only managing to appear in sixteen league matches and twice in the Copa Argentina.

==== 2016: Loan to Defensa y Justicia ====
Rodríguez also spent time on loan with Defensa y Justicia in 2016, managing fifteen league appearances.

=== Tijuana ===
In the summer of 2016, Rodríguez joined Mexican side Club Tijuana. He made 39 league appearances and scored five goals.

=== América ===
On 7 July 2017, Rodríguez joined Club América in a reported $7 million deal, reuniting with former Tijuana manager Miguel Herrera. In July 2019, after helping Club América to the 2018 Apertura, Rodríguez won the Balón de Oro award.

=== Real Betis ===
==== 2020–21: Loan and permanent transfer ====
On 14 January 2020, with six months remaining on his Club América contract, Rodríguez moved to Europe, signing for La Liga side Real Betis. On 8 July 2020, following early criticism in his Betis career, Rodríguez scored his first goal for the club, coming four minutes into a 3–0 win against Osasuna.

==== 2021–22: Copa del Rey title ====
In his second full season at the club, Rodríguez won the 2021–22 Copa del Rey with Betis, playing the full 120 minutes in the final against Valencia.

==== 2023–24: Final season and departure ====
Following the culmination of the 2023–24 season, Rodríguez left Real Betis, after the expiry of his contract.

=== West Ham United ===
On 6 August 2024, Rodríguez joined Premier League club West Ham United on a free transfer. On 17 August, he made his debut for the club, in a 2–1 loss against Aston Villa in the league.

=== Valencia ===
On 26 January 2026, Rodríguez returned to Spain, joining Valencia on a contract until the end of the season. On 3 July 2026, he renewed his contract for a further 2 years, with the option of a third year.

== International career ==
On 9 June 2017, Rodríguez earned his first call-up with the Argentina national team for the friendly match against Brazil in Melbourne. He came on as a substitute for Paulo Dybala in Argentina's 1–0 win.

In May 2019, Rodríguez was included in Argentina's 23-man squad for the 2019 Copa América.

He scored his first international goal in Argentina's second group match of the 2021 Copa América on 18 June 2021, the only goal in a 1–0 victory against Uruguay.

On 11 November 2022, Rodríguez was included in Argentina's 26-man squad for the 2022 FIFA World Cup. He would start the second group match against Mexico in his only appearance in the tournament.

In June 2024, Rodríguez was included in Lionel Scaloni's final 26-man Argentina squad for the 2024 Copa América.

== Career statistics ==
=== Club ===
As of match played 23 May 2026

Appearances and goals by club, season and competition
Club	Season	League			National cup (Note: Includes Copa Argentina, Copa MX, Copa del Rey, FA Cup)		League cup (Note: Includes EFL Cup)		Continental		Other		Total	
Club	Season	Division	Apps	Goals	Apps	Goals	Apps	Goals	Apps	Goals	Apps	Goals	Apps	Goals
River Plate	2014	Argentine Primera División	7	0	1	0	–		–		–		8	0
River Plate	2015	Argentine Primera División	9	1	1	0	–		–		–		10	1
River Plate	Total		16	1	2	0	–		–		–		18	1
Defensa y Justicia (loan)	2016	Argentine Primera División	15	0	1	0	–		–		–		16	0
Tijuana	2016–17	Liga MX	39	5	3	0	–		–		–		42	5
América	2017–18	Liga MX	37	1	6	0	–		4 (Note: Appearances in CONCACAF Champions League)	0	1 (Note: Appearance in Supercopa MX)	0	48	1
América	2018–19	Liga MX	44	8	7	0	–		–		–		51	8
América	2019–20	Liga MX	22	3	–		–		0	0	2 (Note: One appearance in Campeones Cup, one appearance in Leagues Cup)	0	24	3
América	Total		103	12	13	0	–		4	0	3	0	123	12
Real Betis	2019–20	La Liga	14	1	1	0	–		–		–		15	1
Real Betis	2020–21	La Liga	35	1	3	1	–		–		–		38	2
Real Betis	2021–22	La Liga	32	1	6	0	–		9 (Note: Appearances in UEFA Europa League)	1	–		47	1
Real Betis	2022–23	La Liga	34	1	2	0	–		7	1	1 (Note: Appearance in Supercopa de España)	0	44	2
Real Betis	2023–24	La Liga	24	2	0	0	–		5	0	–		29	2
Real Betis	Total		139	6	12	1	–		21	2	1	0	173	9
West Ham United	2024–25	Premier League	23	0	0	0	1	0	–		–		24	0
West Ham United	2025–26	Premier League	6	0	1	0	1	0	–		–		8	0
West Ham United	Total		29	0	1	0	2	0	–		–		32	0
Valencia	2025–26	La Liga	16	4	1	0	–		–		–		17	4
Career total			358	28	33	1	2	0	25	2	4	0	421	31

=== International ===
As of match played 29 June 2024

Appearances and goals by national team and year
National team	Year	Apps	Goals
Argentina	2017	1	0
Argentina	2019	8	0
Argentina	2020	1	0
Argentina	2021	10	1
Argentina	2022	7	0
Argentina	2023	2	0
Argentina	2024	1	0
Total		30	1

Scores and results list Argentina's goal tally first, score column indicates score after each Rodríguez goal.

List of international goals scored by Guido Rodríguez
No.	Date	Venue	Opponent	Score	Result	Competition
1	18 June 2021	Estádio Nacional Mané Garrincha, Brasília, Brazil	Uruguay	1–0	1–0	2021 Copa América

== Honours ==
River Plate

- Copa Sudamericana: 2014
- Copa Libertadores: 2015

América

- Liga MX: Apertura 2018
- Copa MX: Clausura 2019

Betis

- Copa del Rey: 2021–22

Argentina

- FIFA World Cup: 2022
- Copa América: 2021, 2024
- CONMEBOL–UEFA Cup of Champions: 2022

Individual

- Liga MX Defensive Midfielder of the Year: 2016–17, 2018–19
- Liga MX Balón de Oro: 2018–19
