= Chadi Riad =

Moroccan footballer (born 2003)

- Riad with Morocco in 2026

Personal information
- Full name: Chadi Riad Dnanou
- Date of birth: 17 June 2003 (age 23)
- Place of birth: Palma, Spain
- Height: 1.87 m (6 ft 2 in)
- Position: Centre-back

Team information
- Current team: Crystal Palace
- Number: 4

Youth career
- 2009–2011: Atlético Rafal
- 2011–2014: Mallorca
- 2014–2015: San Francisco
- 2015–2019: Mallorca
- 2019–2022: Barcelona
- 2020–2021: → Sabadell (loan)

Senior career*
Years	Team	Apps	(Gls)
2020–2021	→ Sabadell (loan)	1	(0)
2022–2023	Barcelona B	35	(2)
2022–2024	Barcelona	1	(0)
2023–2024	→ Betis (loan)	26	(0)
2024–	Crystal Palace	11	(0)

International career^{‡}
2018–2019	Morocco U17	5	(0)
2022–	Morocco U20	1	(1)
2023–	Morocco U23	10	(0)
2024–	Morocco	10	(1)
Medal record
Representing Morocco
U-23 Africa Cup of Nations
Winner	2023 Morocco
UNAF U-17 Tournament
Winner	2018 Tunisia
- * Club domestic league appearances and goals as of 17:00, 22 August 2026 (UTC) ‡ National team caps and goals as of 30 June 2026

Chadi Riad Dnanou (Arabic: شادي رياض دنانو; born 17 June 2003) is a professional footballer who plays as a centre-back for Premier League club Crystal Palace. Born in Spain, he plays for the Morocco national team.

A graduate of Barcelona's La Masia academy, Riad made his debut for the senior team in 2022. After a year-long loan at Real Betis, he was signed by Crystal Palace in 2024, where he won the FA Cup in 2025 and the UEFA Conference League in 2026.

Born in Spain, Riad was a youth international for Morocco. He made his senior debut in 2024, and was included in the squad for the 2023 Africa Cup of Nations and the 2026 FIFA World Cup.

== Club career ==
=== Barcelona ===
==== Early career ====
Born in Palma de Mallorca, Balearic Islands to Moroccan parents, Riad represented CD Atlético Rafal, RCD Mallorca (two stints) and CD San Francisco before agreeing to a three-year deal with FC Barcelona in February 2019, effective as of July 2019.

==== 2020–21: Loan to Sabadell ====
In 2020, Riad moved to CE Sabadell FC on loan for one year, being assigned to the Juvenil A squad. He made his senior – and first team – debut on 16 December 2020, starting in a 2–0 away win against CD Ibiza Islas Pitiusas, for the season's Copa del Rey.

Riad's Segunda División debut occurred on 11 January 2021, as he came on as a late substitute for Aleix Coch in a 1–1 home draw against CD Lugo.

==== 2022–23: B-team and first team debut ====
On 5 July 2022, Riad renewed his contract with Barça until 2024, and was promoted to the reserves in Primera Federación. He scored the winning goal on the season-opener match on 27 August, netting his side's third in a 3–2 home win over CD Castellón.

Riad made his first team – and La Liga – debut for Barcelona on 8 November 2022, replacing goalscorer Pedri late into a 2–1 away success over CA Osasuna. He was an undisputed starter for Rafael Márquez's B-side during the campaign, scoring three goals in 37 matches overall as the side missed out promotion in the play-offs.

==== 2023–24: Loan to Betis ====
On 26 July 2023, Riad joined Real Betis on a season-long loan deal with a mandatory option to buy for €3 million.

=== Crystal Palace ===
On 14 June 2024, Premier League club Crystal Palace announced the signing of Riad on a five-year contract, for a reported fee of £14m including add-ons. His debut season was severely disrupted by injury; having made his first senior appearance against West Ham United in August 2024, he sustained a knee injury in his second outing, in the EFL Cup against Norwich City, which kept him sidelined for over three months. Upon his return in late December 2024, he suffered a further knee injury in January 2025 which ruled him out for the remainder of the 2024–25 season, restricting him to just three appearances in total.

Riad returned to first-team action on 25 January 2026, coming off the bench in a 3–1 home defeat to Chelsea, and assisted Chris Richards' late consolation goal shortly after his introduction. He started the 2026 UEFA Conference League final on 27 May, playing the full 90 minutes in a three-man backline as Palace defeated Rayo Vallecano 1–0 in Leipzig to claim the club's first ever European trophy.

== International career ==
Riad represented Morocco at under-20 level in 2022, scoring in a friendly against Romania on 29 March. On 13 March 2023, he was called up to the full squad by manager Walid Regragui, for friendlies against Brazil and Peru. Riad also featured with the under-23 team in the 2023 U-23 Africa Cup of Nations, appearing in two matches as the side lifted the trophy.

Riad made the final squad for the senior Morocco national team at the 2023 Africa Cup of Nations. He debuted with Morocco in a 3–1 pre-tournament friendly win over Sierra Leone on 11 January 2024.

On 26 May 2026, Riad was selected in the 26-man squad for the 2026 FIFA World Cup.

== Career statistics ==
=== Club ===
As of match played 22 August 2026

Appearances and goals by club, season and competition
Club	Season	League			National cup (Note: Includes Copa del Rey, FA Cup)		League cup (Note: Includes EFL Cup)		Europe		Other		Total	
Club	Season	Division	Apps	Goals	Apps	Goals	Apps	Goals	Apps	Goals	Apps	Goals	Apps	Goals
Sabadell	2020–21	Segunda División	1	0	1	0	—		—		—		2	0
Barcelona Atlètic	2022–23	Primera Federación	35	2	—		—		—		2 (Note: Appearances in Primera Federación promotion play-offs)	1	37	3
Barcelona	2022–23	La Liga	1	0	0	0	—		0	0	0	0	1	0
Real Betis (loan)	2023–24	La Liga	26	0	2	0	—		2 (Note: Appearances in UEFA (Europa) Conference League)	0	—		30	0
Crystal Palace	2024–25	Premier League	1	0	1	0	1	0	—		—		3	0
Crystal Palace	2025–26	Premier League	9	0	0	0	0	0	3	0	0	0	12	0
Crystal Palace	2026–27	Premier League	1	0	0	0	0	0	0	0	—		1	0
Crystal Palace	Total		11	0	1	0	1	0	3	0	0	0	16	0
Career total			74	2	4	0	1	0	5	0	2	1	86	3

=== International ===
As of match played 29 June 2026

Appearances and goals by national team and year
National team	Year	Apps	Goals
Morocco	2024	3	1
Morocco	2026	7	0
Total		10	1

Morocco score listed first, score column indicates score after each Riad goal.

List of international goals scored by Chadi Riad
No.	Date	Venue	Opponent	Score	Result	Competition
1	11 June 2024	Adrar Stadium, Agadir, Morocco	Congo	2–0	6–0	2026 FIFA World Cup qualification

== Honours ==
Barcelona

- La Liga: 2022–23

Crystal Palace

- FA Cup: 2024–25
- FA Community Shield: 2025
- UEFA Conference League: 2025–26

Morocco U17

- UNAF U-17 Tournament: 2018

Morocco U23

- U-23 Africa Cup of Nations: 2023
