= Pablo Busto =

Spanish footballer (born 2005)

Personal information
- Full name: Pablo Busto González
- Date of birth: 25 September 2005 (age 21)
- Place of birth: Dos Hermanas, Spain
- Height: 1.80 m (5 ft 11 in)
- Position: Right-back

Team information
- Current team: Betis B
- Number: 2

Youth career
- 2013–2023: Betis
- 2021–2022: → Calavera (loan)

Senior career*
Years	Team	Apps	(Gls)
2022–	Betis B	64	(0)
2024–	Betis	2	(0)

International career
2022–2023	Spain U18	7	(0)
- * Club domestic league appearances and goals as of 10 June 2026

Pablo Busto González (born 25 September 2005) is a Spanish professional footballer who plays as a right-back for Betis Deportivo Balompié.

== Club career ==
Busto was born in Dos Hermanas, Seville, Andalusia, and joined Real Betis' youth setup at the age of seven. After a loan spell to Calavera CF during the 2021–22 season, he returned to the Verdiblancos and made his senior debut with the reserves on 2 October 2022, coming on as a late substitute in a 1–1 Segunda Federación away draw against Xerez Deportivo FC.

On 13 July 2023, Busto renewed his contract with Betis until 2025. He made his first team – and La Liga – debut the following 13 January, replacing Aitor Ruibal in a 1–0 home win over Granada CF.

== International career ==
Busto represented Spain at under-18 level.
