= Enrique Fernández (footballer, born 2003) =

Spanish footballer

Personal information
- Full name: Enrique Fernández López
- Date of birth: 16 September 2003 (age 23)
- Place of birth: Trebujena, Spain
- Height: 1.78 m (5 ft 10 in)
- Position: Midfielder

Team information
- Current team: Deportivo B
- Number: 10

Youth career
- 2009–2013: Trebujena CF
- 2013–2015: Cádiz
- 2015–2022: Betis

Senior career*
Years	Team	Apps	(Gls)
2022–2024	Betis B	56	(0)
2022–2024	Betis	0	(0)
2024–	Deportivo B	49	(1)

International career
2019	Spain U16	4	(0)
- * Club domestic league appearances and goals as of 14 May 2026

Enrique Fernández López (born 16 September 2003), sometimes known as Quique, is a Spanish professional footballer who plays as a midfielder for Deportivo B.

== Professional career ==
Fernández is a youth product of Trebujena CF and Cádiz CF, before joining the youth academy of Real Betis in 2015. He worked his way up their youth categories, before captaining their U19s and being promoted to their reserve team in 2021. On 25 August 2022, he signed his first professional contract with Real Betis until 2024. He made his senior and professional debut with Real Betis as a late substitute in a 1–0 UEFA Europa League win over Ludogorets on 27 October 2022.

== International career ==
Fernández is a youth international for Spain, having played up to the Spain U16s.

== Playing style ==
Fernández is a physical midfielder with passing technique. He is adept at occupying space, and moves with and without the ball. He is a playmaker, ball holder and rarely loses possession.
