= Julio Gracia =

Spanish footballer

Personal information
- Full name: Julio Gracia Gallardo
- Date of birth: 10 February 1998 (age 28)
- Place of birth: El Saucejo, Spain
- Height: 1.70 m (5 ft 7 in)
- Position: Central midfielder

Team information
- Current team: Intercity
- Number: 6

Youth career
- 2013–2016: Betis

Senior career*
Years	Team	Apps	(Gls)
2015–2018	Betis B	67	(3)
2017–2020	Betis	2	(0)
2018–2019	→ Cartagena (loan)	30	(3)
2019–2020	→ Badajoz (loan)	19	(0)
2020–2021	Getafe B	4	(1)
2021	Linares Deportivo	10	(0)
2021–2023	Murcia	65	(2)
2023–2024	Castellón	21	(1)
2024–	Intercity	61	(7)
- * Club domestic league appearances and goals as of 16 May 2026

Julio Gracia Gallardo (born 10 February 1998) is a Spanish footballer who plays as a central midfielder for Intercity.

== Club career ==
Born in El Saucejo, Seville, Andalusia, Gracia joined Real Betis' youth setup in 2013. He made his senior debut with the B-team on 22 August 2015, starting in a 1–0 Segunda División B home loss against Mérida AD.

Gracia scored his first senior goal on 11 September 2016, netting his team's last in a 3–1 away defeat of CD Alcalá. The following 15 March, he renewed his contract with the club.

Gracia made his first team – and La Liga – debut on 10 December 2017, coming on as a second-half substitute for Antonio Barragán in a 1–0 home loss against Atlético Madrid. The following 27 August, he joined FC Cartagena in the third division, on loan for one year.

On 15 July 2019, Gracia joined fellow third division side CD Badajoz on loan for the season. On 17 August of the following year, he moved to another reserve team, Getafe CF B in the same category.

On 29 June 2024, Gracia signed with Intercity in Primera Federación.
