= Ricardo Visus =

Spanish footballer (born 2001)

Personal information
- Full name: Ricardo Visus Contreras
- Date of birth: 24 April 2001 (age 25)
- Place of birth: Madrid, Spain
- Height: 1.92 m (6 ft 4 in)
- Position: Centre back

Team information
- Current team: Widzew Łódź
- Number: 14

Youth career
- Santa Marta
- 2018–2019: Betis

Senior career*
Years	Team	Apps	(Gls)
2019–2024	Betis B	57	(3)
2020–2021	→ Córdoba B (loan)	22	(1)
2021–2022	→ Córdoba (loan)	13	(0)
2023–2025	Betis	3	(0)
2024–2025	→ Almere City (loan)	24	(1)
2025–	Widzew Łódź	19	(0)
- * Club domestic league appearances and goals as of 17:20, 29 May 2026 (UTC)

Ricardo Visus Contreras (born 24 April 2001) is a Spanish professional footballer who plays as a central defender for Ekstraklasa club Widzew Łódź.

== Career ==
Born in Madrid, Visus joined Real Betis' youth setup in August 2018, from UD Santa Marta. He made his senior debut with the reserves on 31 October 2019, starting in a 1–0 Tercera División away loss to CD Ciudad de Lucena.

On 5 October 2020, Visus moved on loan to Córdoba CF, being assigned to the B-team also in the fourth division. On 9 August of the following year, after two first team appearances, his loan was extended for a further year; he also renewed his contract with the Verdiblancos until 2024.

Upon returning to Betis in July 2022, Visus was assigned back to the B-side, now in Segunda Federación. He spent the 2023 pre-season with the main squad, and made his professional – and La Liga – debut on 21 October 2023, coming on as a second-half substitute for Andrés Guardado in a 1–1 away draw against Getafe CF.

On 3 July 2024, Visus renewed his contract with the Verdiblancos until 2027, and was loaned to Dutch Eredivisie side Almere City FC ten days later.

On 2 July 2025, Visus signed a four-year deal with Polish Ekstraklasa club Widzew Łódź for a fee reported to be €400,000 and a 10% of a future sale.
