= Patrik Carlgren =

Swedish footballer (born 1992)

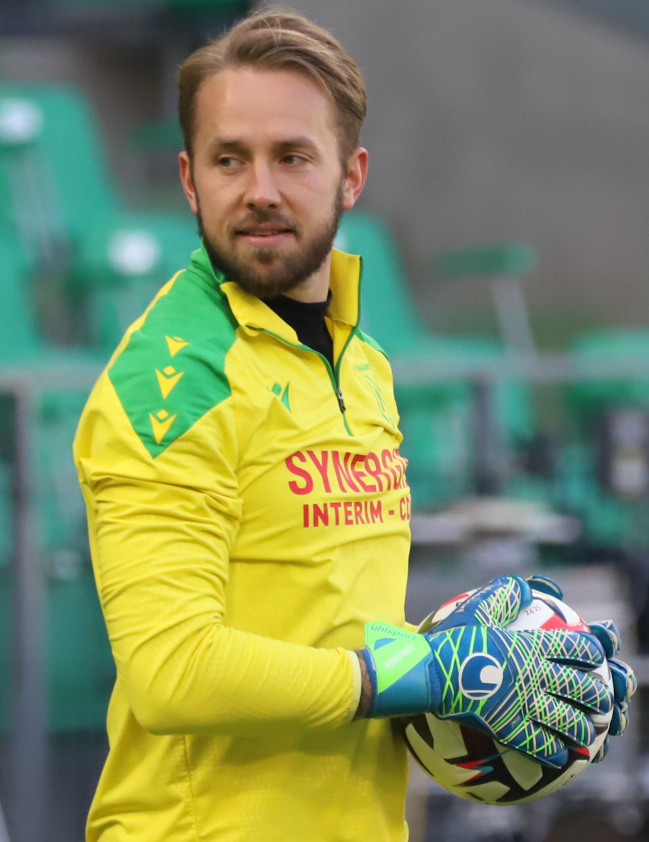
- Carlgren with Nantes in 2025

Personal information
- Full name: Patrik Ulf Anders Carlgren
- Date of birth: 8 January 1992 (age 34)
- Place of birth: Falun, Sweden
- Height: 1.88 m (6 ft 2 in)
- Position: Goalkeeper

Team information
- Current team: Nantes
- Number: 30

Youth career
- Samuelsdals IF

Senior career*
Years	Team	Apps	(Gls)
2009–2011	Falu FK	25	(0)
2012–2013	IK Brage	20	(0)
2013–2016	AIK	75	(0)
2017	Nordsjælland	5	(0)
2017–2018	Konyaspor	1	(0)
2018–2024	Randers	195	(0)
2024–2026	Nantes	8	(0)
2026–	Nantes	2	(0)

International career
2013–2015	Sweden U21	18	(0)
2016	Sweden	1	(0)
Medal record
Men's football
Representing Sweden
UEFA European Under-21 Championship
Winner	2015 Czech Republic
- * Club domestic league appearances and goals as of 17 May 2026

Patrik Ulf Anders Carlgren (born 8 January 1992) is a Swedish professional footballer who plays as a goalkeeper for Nantes.

== Club career ==
Carlgren progressed through the youth teams of Samuelsdals IF. He started his senior career spending two years with Falu FK. Afterwards, he played two seasons for IK Brage in Superettan, making 23 appearances.

In July 2013, Carlgren was signed by AIK. He made his Allsvenskan debut on 8 May 2014 against Halmstads BK.

In February 2017, Carlgren signed with Danish Superliga club FC Nordsjælland.

In July 2017, he signed a two-year contract with Turkish Süper Lig club Konyaspor.

On 8 July 2018, Carlgren returned to Denmark to sign a three-year contract with Randers FC. In February 2021, Carlgren extended his contract with the club until 2024. On 22 May 2024 Randers confirmed that Carlgren left the club as his contract expired.

== International career ==
=== Youth ===
Carlgren was part of the Swedish team which won the 2015 European Under-21 Championship, saving from Ricardo Esgaio and William Carvalho in the penalty shootout in the final against Portugal, after a 0–0 draw in Prague.

=== Senior ===
Carlgren was called up to the senior Sweden squad to face Denmark for the UEFA Euro 2016 play-off in November 2015. He made his full international debut on 10 January 2016 in a friendly 3–0 win against Finland, playing for 62 minutes before being replaced by Jacob Rinne. Carlgren was a squad player at Euro 2016, serving as a backup goalkeeper behind Andreas Isaksson and Robin Olsen.

== Career statistics ==
As of 2 May 2026

Appearances and goals by club, season and competition
Club	Season	League			Cup		Europe		Other		Total	
Club	Season	Division	Apps	Goals	Apps	Goals	Apps	Goals	Apps	Goals	Apps	Goals
Falu FK	2009	Division 2 Norra Svealand	1	0	—		—		—		1	0
Falu FK	2010	Division 3 Södra Norrland	5	0	—		—		—		5	0
Falu FK	2011	Division 2 Norra Svealand	19	0	—		—		—		19	0
Falu FK	Total		25	0	—		—		—		25	0
Brage	2012	Superettan	8	0	1	0	—		—		9	0
Brage	2013	Superettan	12	0	3	0	—		—		15	0
Brage	Total		20	0	4	0	—		—		24	0
AIK	2014	Allsvenskan	22	0	1	0	4	0	—		27	0
AIK	2015	Allsvenskan	25	0	1	0	3	0	—		29	0
AIK	2016	Allsvenskan	28	0	4	0	4	0	—		36	0
AIK	Total		75	0	6	0	11	0	—		92	0
Nordsjælland	2016–17	Danish Superliga	5	0	0	0	0	0	—		5	0
Konyaspor	2017–18	Süper Lig	1	0	4	0	0	0	—		5	0
Randers	2018–19	Danish Superliga	37	0	0	0	—		—		37	0
Randers	2019–20	Danish Superliga	31	0	1	0	—		—		32	0
Randers	2020–21	Danish Superliga	31	0	5	0	—		—		36	0
Randers	2021–22	Danish Superliga	32	0	2	0	10	0	—		44	0
Randers	2022–23	Danish Superliga	31	0	1	0	—		—		32	0
Randers	2023–24	Danish Superliga	33	0	1	0	—		1	0	35	0
Randers	Total		195	0	10	0	10	0	1	0	216	0
Nantes	2024–25	Ligue 1	5	0	2	0	—		—		7	0
Nantes	2025–26	Ligue 1	3	0	1	0	—		—		4	0
Nantes	Total		8	0	3	0	—		—		11	0
Career total			329	0	27	0	21	0	1	0	378	0

== Honours ==
Randers

- Danish Cup: 2020–21

Sweden U21

- UEFA European Under-21 Championship: 2015
