= 2015 UEFA European Under-21 Championship final =

2015 UEFA European Under-21 Championship Final
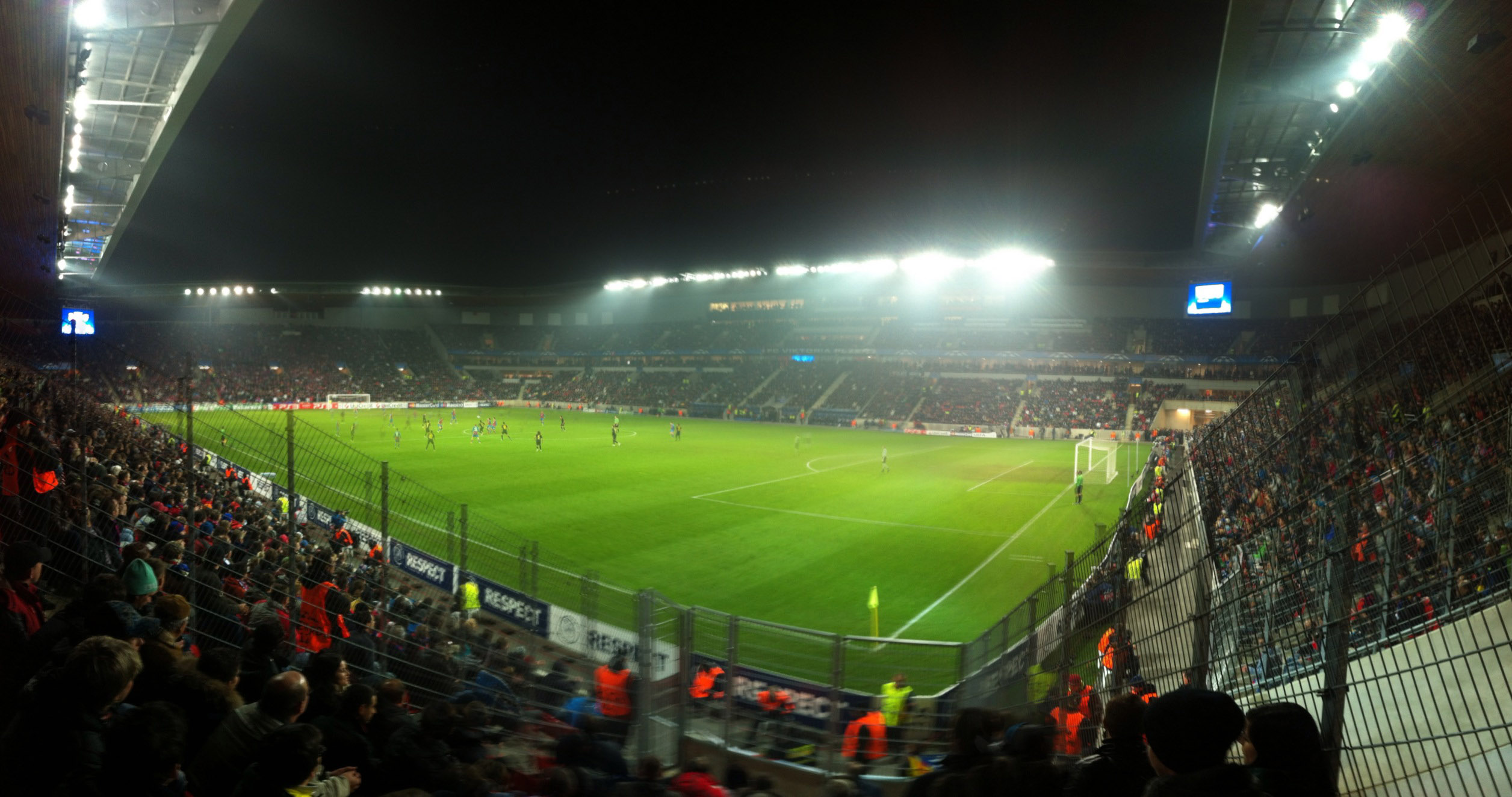
- The Eden Arena in Prague held the final
- Event: 2015 UEFA European Under-21 Championship
Sweden	Portugal
(Sweden)	(Portugal)
0	0
- After extra time Sweden won 4–3 on penalties
- Date: 30 June 2015
- Venue: Eden Arena, Prague
- Man of the Match: Patrik Carlgren (Sweden)
- Referee: Szymon Marciniak (Poland)
- Attendance: 18,867

The 2015 UEFA European Under-21 Championship Final was a football match that took place on 30 June 2015 at the Eden Arena in Prague, Czech Republic, and determined the winner of the 2015 UEFA European Under-21 Championship. Sweden won their first title defeating Portugal 4–3 in the penalty shoot-out, after a goalless draw.

== Route to the final ==
Sweden
Round
Portugal
Opponent
Result
Group stage
Opponent
Result
Italy
2–1
Match 1
England
1–0
England
0–1
Match 2
Italy
0–0
Portugal
1–1
Match 3
Sweden
1–1

Group B
Pos	Team	Pld	W	D	L	GF	GA	GD	Pts	Group stage result
1	Portugal	3	1	2	0	2	1	+1	5	Advanced
2	Sweden	3	1	1	1	3	3	0	4	Advanced
3	Italy	3	1	1	1	4	3	+1	4	
4	England	3	1	0	2	2	4	−2	3	

Source: UEFA
Rules for classification: tie-breaking
Final standings

Group B
Pos	Team	Pld	W	D	L	GF	GA	GD	Pts	Group stage result
1	Portugal	3	1	2	0	2	1	+1	5	Advanced
2	Sweden	3	1	1	1	3	3	0	4	Advanced
3	Italy	3	1	1	1	4	3	+1	4	
4	England	3	1	0	2	2	4	−2	3	

Source: UEFA
Rules for classification: tie-breaking
Opponent
Result
Knockout stage
Opponent
Result
Denmark
4–1
Semifinals
Germany
5–0

== Match details ==
30 June 2015
20:45

Sweden	0–0 (a.e.t.)	Portugal
	Report
Penalties
Guidetti (penalty scored); Kiese Thelin (penalty scored); Augustinsson (penalty scored); Khalili (penalty missed); Lindelöf (penalty scored)	4–3	(penalty scored) Paciência; (penalty scored) Tozé; (penalty missed) Esgaio; (penalty scored) João Mário; (penalty missed) Carvalho

Eden Arena, Prague
Attendance: 18,867
Referee: Szymon Marciniak (Poland)

Sweden	Portugal

GK	1	Patrik Carlgren
RB	2	Victor Lindelöf	(yellow card) 112'
CB	3	Alexander Milošević
CB	4	Filip Helander		(substituted off) 46'
LB	5	Ludwig Augustinsson
CM	7	Oscar Hiljemark (c)
CM	6	Oscar Lewicki
RW	8	Abdul Khalili
LW	16	Simon Tibbling		(substituted off) 66'
CF	10	John Guidetti
CF	11	Isaac Kiese Thelin
Substitutions:
DF	17	Joseph Baffo	(yellow card) 110'	(substituted on) 46'
MF	20	Robin Quaison		(substituted on) 66'
Manager:
Håkan Ericson

GK	1	José Sá
RB	2	Ricardo Esgaio
CB	4	Paulo Oliveira
CB	3	Tiago Ilori
LB	5	Raphaël Guerreiro
DM	6	William Carvalho
RW	23	João Mário
AM	10	Bernardo Silva
LW	8	Sérgio Oliveira (c)	(substituted off) 54'
CF	21	Ricardo Pereira	(substituted off) 70'
CF	18	Ivan Cavaleiro	(substituted off) 61'
Substitutions:
MF	20	Tozé	(substituted on) 54'
FW	11	Iuri Medeiros	(substituted on) 61'
FW	9	Gonçalo Paciência	(substituted on) 70'
Manager:
Rui Jorge

Assistant referees:
Paweł Sokolnicki (Poland)
Tomasz Listkiewicz (Poland)
Fourth official:
Clément Turpin (France)
Additional assistant referees:
Paweł Raczkowski (Poland)
Tomasz Musiał (Poland)
