= Simon Tibbling =

Swedish footballer (born 1994)

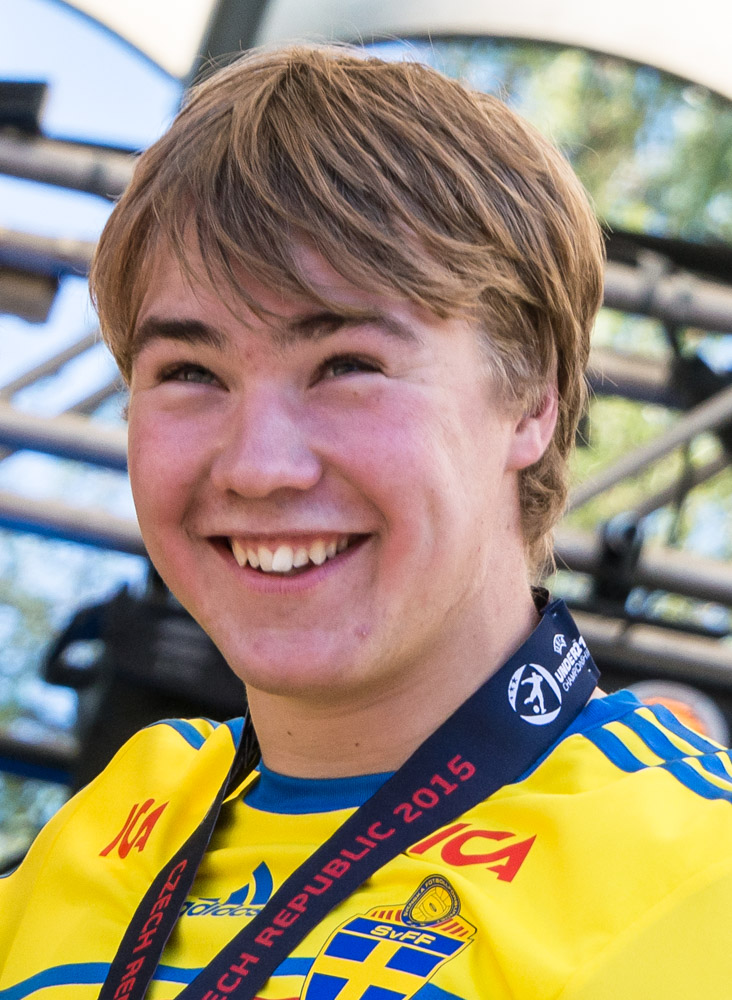
- Tibbling celebrating the 2015 win.

Personal information
- Full name: Simon Hjalmar Friedel Tibbling
- Date of birth: 7 September 1994 (age 32)
- Place of birth: Stockholm, Sweden
- Height: 1.74 m (5 ft 9 in)
- Position: Midfielder

Team information
- Current team: Fram
- Number: 12

Youth career
- 2000–2004: Grödinge SK
- 2005–2010: IF Brommapojkarna
- 2010–2012: Djurgårdens IF

Senior career*
| Years | Team | Apps | (Gls) |
| 2012–2014 | Djurgårdens IF | 73 | (3) |
| 2015–2017 | Groningen | 74 | (2) |
| 2017–2020 | Brøndby | 90 | (9) |
| 2020–2021 | Emmen | 15 | (0) |
| 2021–2022 | Randers | 26 | (0) |
| 2022–2025 | Sarpsborg 08 | 45 | (2) |
| 2025– | Fram | 45 | (4) |

International career
| 2009–2011 | Sweden U17 | 16 | (4) |
| 2012–2013 | Sweden U19 | 13 | (0) |
| 2012–2017 | Sweden U21/O | 33 | (2) |
| 2019 | Sweden | 1 | (0) |
Medal record
Men's football
Representing Sweden
UEFA European Under-21 Championship
| Winner | 2015 Czech Republic |
- * Club domestic league appearances and goals as of 1 November 2026

Simon Hjalmar Friedel Tibbling (born 7 September 1994) is a Swedish professional footballer who plays as a midfielder for Fram in the Besta deildin. He has made one appearance for the Sweden national team.

Born in Stockholm, Tibbling joined Djurgårdens IF in 2010 after having spent five years at the Brommapojkarna academy. He debuted in the Allsvenskan in 2012, and moved to Eredivisie club FC Groningen in 2015. In 2017, he was signed by Brøndby IF in the Danish Superliga, with whom he won the Danish Cup in his first season. He moved back to the Netherlands in 2020 where he signed with FC Emmen.

Tibbling has represented Sweden at different youth levels and made his under-21 debut in 2012. He won the 2015 UEFA European Under-21 Championship with Sweden. In 2019, Tibbling was called up to the senior team, making his debut in a 1–0 loss to Finland.

== Career ==
=== Early career ===
Tibbling started out playing football at age six when his mother brought him to play with the local lower league club Grödinge SK. At age nine Tibbling was invited by Stockholm based club IF Brommapojkarna, known for its youth academy to come train with them and six months later he joined them permanently. During his years there Tibbling drew a lot of attention from some of the biggest clubs in the world. He went on trials with Manchester United, Bayern Munich and Ajax. In the summer of 2010 Ajax met and negotiated with Brommapojkarna, but Tibbling wanted to stay in Sweden. Before the 2011 season Tibbling instead chose to move to the bigger Stockholm club Djurgårdens IF.

=== Djurgården ===
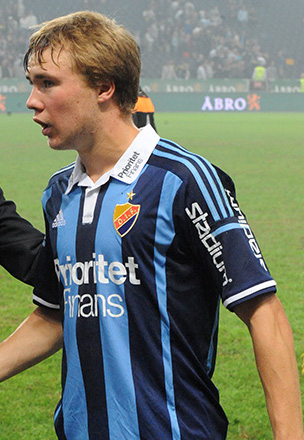
Tibbling playing for Djurgårdens IF.

Simon Tibbling made his senior debut in Djurgårdens IF coming on as a sub in the top Swedish division Allsvenskan against Kalmar FF in the 91st minute. He then made his starting debut in the league against IFK Göteborg on 3 July 2012. Four days after his 18th birthday Tibbling signed a first team contract, extending his deal with Djurgården by another 4.5 years.

=== Groningen ===
On 28 November 2014, Tibbling was presented as a new FC Groningen player on 1 January 2015 before helping the Green-White Army win the KNVB Cup in the 2014–15 season against defending champions PEC Zwolle. It was their first major trophy and they qualified for the UEFA Europa League.

Tibbling was voted "Player of the Season" of the 2015–16 season by the fans of the club.

=== Brøndby ===
On 21 July 2017, Tibbling signed a five-year deal with Danish top tier side Brøndby. He scored his first goal for the club in his Superliga debut, a 1–0 victory against rivals FC Copenhagen, after having come on as a substitute for Besar Halimi in the 88th minute. Tibbling quickly established himself in head coach Alexander Zorniger's side, and was nominated for a goal he scored against Silkeborg IF in October 2017, which ended up being awarded ‘Goal of the Season’ by the Danish Football Union, beating out fellow nominees including Christian Eriksen and Peter Ankersen. His first season in Brøndby was highly successful, making 35 appearances across all competitions and scoring three goals, as Brøndby made a failed push for the league championship, ending in second place behind FC Midtjylland. However, Tibbling appeared as a starter as Brøndby beat Silkeborg IF 3–1 in the 2017–18 Danish Cup final.

In his second season at Brøndby, controversy arose in September 2018, as tabloid B.T. revealed a confrontation between Tibbling and head coach Zorniger after a match in October the previous year. This had led to Tibbling contacting director of football, Troels Bech the following day. The case came a month after league rivals Midtjylland had offered DKK 7.5 million (€1 million) in an effort to sign him, efforts which were not immediately dismissed by Tibbling and his agent, fuelling doubts about his commitment to his club. Tibbling would personally experience a strong 2018–19 season, making 43 appearances in which he scored five goals, as Brøndby, however, went through a tumultuous period. The club had dropped off to fourth place and lost the cup final to Midtjylland, while head coach Zorniger had been dismissed halfway through the season.

In the following season, Tibbling slowly saw his playing time diminished under new head coach Niels Frederiksen, as a foot injury suffered in August 2019 kept him out for three months.

=== Emmen ===
On 27 July 2020, Tibbling agreed to sign for Dutch Eredivisie club FC Emmen, joining the club on a two-year contract with an option of another year.

=== Randers ===
In May 2021, Tibbling returned to the Danish Superliga, signing a four-year contract with Randers FC.

=== Sarpsborg 08 ===
On 29 July 2022, Randers announced that Tibbling had been sold to the Norwegian Eliteserien club Sarpsborg 08. He signed a two-year contract with the club. He made his debut for 08 on 7 August, starting in a 3–1 away loss to Strømsgodset. On 11 September, he scored his first goal for the club, helping his side to a 3–1 away victory against Aalesund.

=== Fram ===
On 20 March 2025, Icelandic club Fram announced the signing of Tibbling.

== International career ==
=== Youth ===
Tibbling represented Sweden at the U17, U19 and U21 levels. In the final group match against Portugal in the 2015 UEFA European Under-21 Championship, Tibbling scored an equalizer in 89th minute which put Sweden through to the semi-final. He again scored in a 4–1 victory in the semi-final against Scandinavian rival Denmark, which saw Sweden advance to the final for the first time since 1992. He also started the final against Portugal. The game ended 0–0 and eventually went to penalties, where Sweden won 4–3, securing their first under-21 title.

=== Senior ===
On 8 January 2019, Tibbling made his senior international debut for the Sweden in a 1–0 loss against Finland.

== Personal life ==
Tibbling credited his mother bribing him with Pokémon cards as the reason he kept his motivation to attend football training sessions when he was a child.

== Career statistics ==
=== Club ===
As of match played 3 December 2023

Appearances and goals by club, season and competition
| Club | Season | League | | | Cup (Note: Includes Svenska Cupen, KNVB Cup, Danish Cup) | | Continental (Note: Includes UEFA Europa League, UEFA Europa Conference League) | | Other (Note: Includes Eredivisie playoffs) | | Total | |
| Club | Season | Division | Apps | Goals | Apps | Goals | Apps | Goals | Apps | Goals | Apps | Goals |
|---|---|---|---|---|---|---|---|---|---|---|---|---|
| Djurgårdens IF | 2012 | Allsvenskan | 15 | 1 | 1 | 0 | — | | — | | 16 | 1 |
| Djurgårdens IF | 2013 | Allsvenskan | 28 | 1 | 4 | 0 | — | | — | | 32 | 1 |
| Djurgårdens IF | 2014 | Allsvenskan | 30 | 1 | 3 | 0 | — | | — | | 33 | 1 |
| Djurgårdens IF | Total | | 73 | 3 | 8 | 0 | 0 | 0 | — | | 81 | 3 |
| Groningen | 2014–15 | Eredivisie | 17 | 1 | 3 | 0 | — | | — | | 20 | 1 |
| Groningen | 2015–16 | Eredivisie | 31 | 0 | 2 | 0 | 6 | 0 | 1 | 0 | 40 | 0 |
| Groningen | 2016–17 | Eredivisie | 26 | 1 | 2 | 0 | — | | — | | 28 | 1 |
| Groningen | Total | | 74 | 2 | 7 | 0 | 6 | 0 | 1 | 0 | 88 | 2 |
| Brøndby | 2017–18 | Superliga | 30 | 3 | 4 | 0 | 1 | 0 | — | | 35 | 3 |
| Brøndby | 2018–19 | Superliga | 36 | 5 | 4 | 0 | 3 | 0 | — | | 43 | 5 |
| Brøndby | 2019–20 | Superliga | 24 | 1 | 0 | 0 | 5 | 1 | — | | 29 | 2 |
| Brøndby | Total | | 90 | 9 | 8 | 0 | 9 | 1 | — | | 107 | 10 |
| Emmen | 2020–21 | Eredivisie | 15 | 0 | 2 | 0 | — | | — | | 17 | 0 |
| Randers | 2021–22 | Superliga | 26 | 0 | 4 | 0 | 10 | 0 | 0 | 0 | 40 | 0 |
| Sarpsborg 08 | 2022 | Eliteserien | 14 | 2 | 0 | 0 | 0 | 0 | 0 | 0 | 14 | 2 |
| Sarpsborg 08 | 2023 | Elitserien | 26 | 1 | 4 | 2 | 0 | 0 | 0 | 0 | 30 | 3 |
| Sarpsborg 08 | Total | | 40 | 3 | 4 | 2 | 0 | 0 | 0 | 0 | 44 | 5 |
| Career total | | | 317 | 17 | 33 | 2 | 25 | 1 | 1 | 0 | 376 | 20 |

== Honours ==
Groningen

- KNVB Cup: 2014–15

Brøndby

- Danish Cup: 2017–18

Sweden U21

- UEFA European Under-21 Championship: 2015
