= William Carvalho =

Portuguese footballer (born 1992)

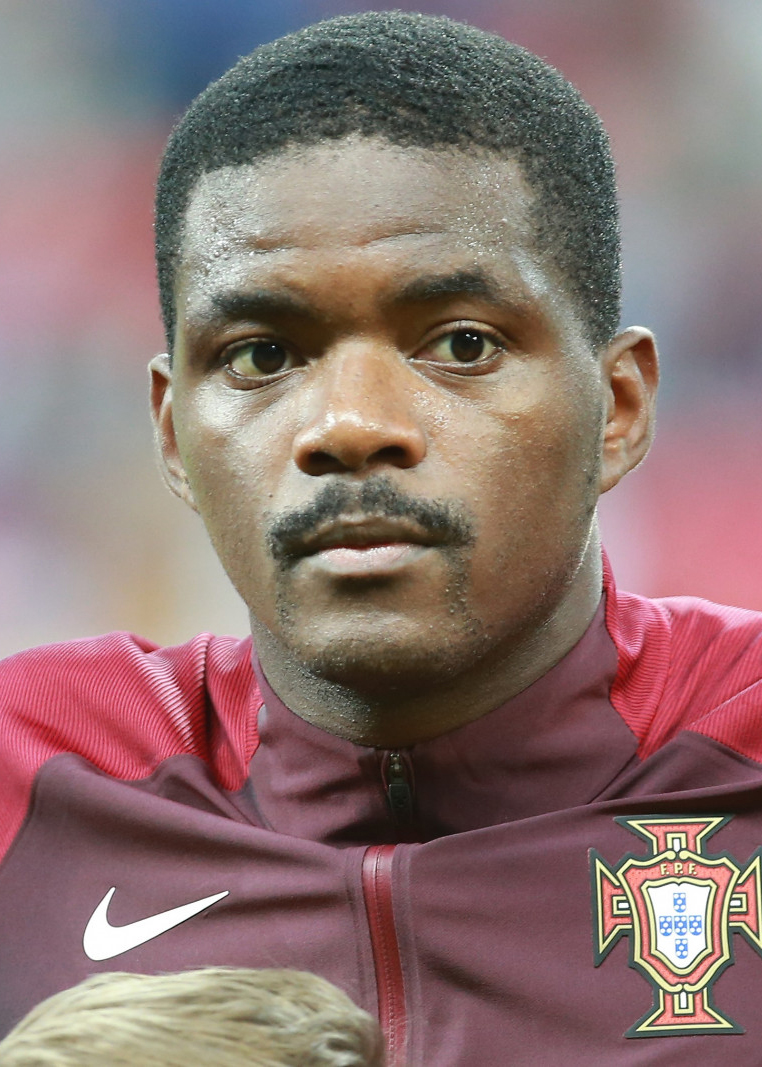
- Carvalho with Portugal at the 2017 FIFA Confederations Cup

Personal information
- Full name: William Silva de Carvalho
- Date of birth: 7 April 1992 (age 34)
- Place of birth: Luanda, Angola
- Height: 1.87 m (6 ft 2 in)
- Position: Defensive midfielder

Team information
- Current team: Palm City
- Number: 14

Youth career
- 2003–2004: Algueirão
- 2004–2005: Mira Sintra
- 2005–2011: Sporting CP

Senior career*
Years	Team	Apps	(Gls)
2011–2018	Sporting CP	143	(10)
2011	→ Fátima (loan)	13	(3)
2012–2013	→ Cercle Brugge (loan)	47	(3)
2018–2025	Betis	172	(8)
2025–2026	Pachuca	9	(0)
2026–	Palm City	0	(0)

International career
2007–2009	Portugal U17	25	(5)
2008–2010	Portugal U18	8	(1)
2010–2011	Portugal U19	9	(2)
2012	Portugal U20	3	(0)
2012–2015	Portugal U21	15	(2)
2013–2022	Portugal	80	(5)
Medal record
Representing Portugal
UEFA European Championship
Winner	2016 France
UEFA Nations League
Winner	2019 Portugal
FIFA Confederations Cup
Third place	2017 Russia
UEFA European Under-21 Championship
Runner-up	2015 Czech Republic
- * Club domestic league appearances and goals as of 03:07, 24 November 2025 (UTC)

William Silva de Carvalho ComM (born 7 April 1992) is a professional footballer who plays as a defensive midfielder for UAE First Division League club Palm City.

He spent most of his early career with Sporting CP since making his debut with the first team at age 18, going on to appear in 193 competitive matches and win the 2015 Taça de Portugal. In 2018 he signed with Real Betis, where he totalled 223 games and won the 2022 Copa del Rey.

Born in Angola, Carvalho was a Portugal international. He represented the nation at three World Cups and two European Championships, winning the 2016 edition of the latter tournament.

== Early life ==
Born in Luanda, Carvalho moved to Portugal when he was just a few years old. His grandfather Praia and his uncle Afonso were also footballers and played for Angolan club Progresso Associação do Sambizanga.

== Club career ==
=== Sporting CP ===
After moving to Portugal, Carvalho first started playing in the streets and was eventually recruited by Recreios Desportivos de Algueirão. In 2004, he joined União Sport Clube de Mira Sintra, where he was the youngest player in the squad and also their captain. He joined Sporting CP's youth system at age 13, making his official debut with the first team on 3 April 2011 by playing injury time in a 1–1 away draw against Vitória S.C. in the Primeira Liga, then spent six months on loan to C.D. Fátima in the third division.

Still under contract to the Lisbon side, Carvalho played one and a half seasons on loan with Cercle Brugge K.S.V. in the Belgian Pro League starting from January 2012, featuring alongside several Sporting teammates who were there on the same basis. His first professional goal came on 7 April in a 6–4 home win over Oud-Heverlee Leuven, and a year later he helped the team to the final of the Belgian Cup, where they lost 2–0 to K.R.C. Genk at the King Baudouin Stadium.

Carvalho returned for the 2013–14 campaign, being a defensive mainstay for newly appointed coach Leonardo Jardim and scoring his first goal for the side on 27 October, equalising an eventual 3–1 defeat at FC Porto. During the following summer, he caught the attention of several European clubs, with Arsenal having their £13 million plus Joel Campbell offer rejected. Sporting only acquired the totality of Carvalho's rights in November 2014, with third-party ownership adding to the difficulties of any possible deal.

Carvalho began 2014–15 by seeing a red card – his first ever – in a 1–1 home draw against Académica de Coimbra, receiving his marching orders after a second bookable offence in the 65th minute. He went on to conquer his first trophy, that season's Taça de Portugal, playing the full 120 minutes in the final victory over S.C. Braga.

Among continued transfer speculation linking him with a number of English Premier League sides, including Arsenal again, manager Jorge Jesus claimed that Carvalho would remain at the club. On 14 July 2015, Sporting confirmed that the player had suffered a stress fracture in his tibia which would sideline him for three months. In 2017, approaches from West Ham United caused a breakdown in relations between the two organisations that was later resolved.

On 15 May 2018, Carvalho and several of his teammates, including coaches, were injured following an attack by around 50 supporters of Sporting at the club's training ground after the team finished third in the league and missed out on qualification for the UEFA Champions League. Despite the events, he and the rest of the team agreed to play in the Portuguese Cup final scheduled for the following weekend, eventually losing to C.D. Aves.

=== Betis ===
On 13 July 2018, Carvalho joined Real Betis on a five-year contract; the Spaniards paid €16 million plus an additional €4 million in variable costs for 75% of the player's rights, with €10 million more to come later for a further 20% of his rights depending on certain conditions and achievements. He made his La Liga debut on 17 August, playing 65 minutes in a 0–3 home loss against Levante UD.

Carvalho was sent off on 15 September 2019 in the 25th minute of a 1–1 home draw with Getafe CF. Days later, he suffered a spinal disc herniation and did not return until February; he played only 13 games over the season, and was subsequently linked with Leicester City.

On 20 September 2020, Carvalho scored his first goal for the Verdiblancos in a 2–0 home defeat of Real Valladolid. He added another six days later, in the 3–2 loss to Real Madrid also at the Estadio Benito Villamarín.

In September 2022, Carvalho agreed to an extension until 2026. On 13 September 2024, during a home fixture against CD Leganés, he completely ruptured the Achilles tendon of his right leg, going on to all but miss the rest of the campaign.

Carvalho departed Betis on 18 July 2025, after seven seasons at the club and 223 competitive appearances, an all-time best for a foreign player. He was an important part of the squad that won the 2021–22 edition of the Copa del Rey.

=== Later career ===
On 25 July 2025, shortly after rejecting an offer from Qatar, Carvalho signed a two-year contract with C.F. Pachuca of the Mexican Liga MX. However, he terminated it in April 2026 by mutual agreement.

Carvalho joined UAE First Division League side Palm City FC in August 2026.

== International career ==
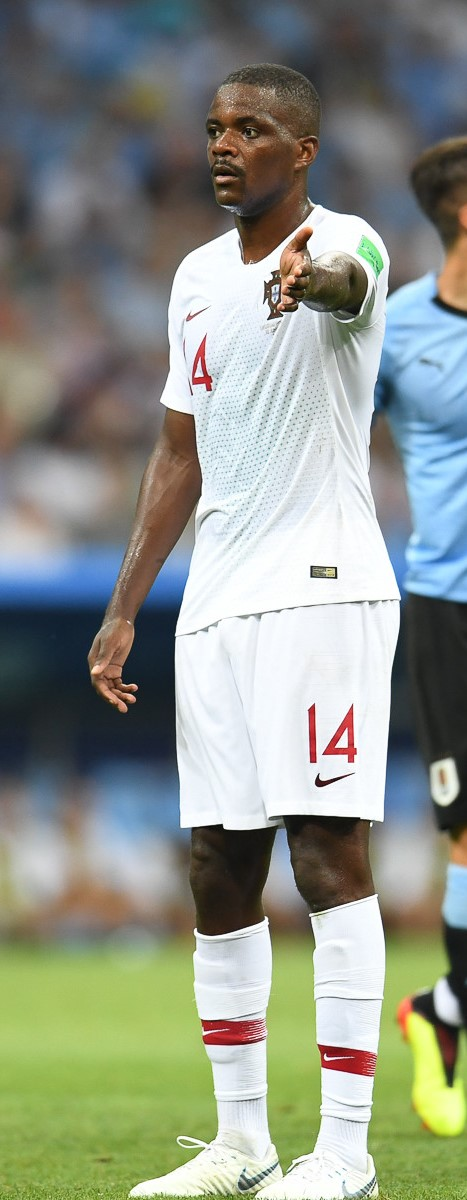
Carvalho playing for Portugal at the 2018 FIFA World Cup

Eligible for both Portugal and Angola, Carvalho chose to represent the former. When he was still part of the Portugal under-20s, the Angolan Football Federation tried to call him up, but was rejected.

Carvalho made his debut with the Portugal under-21 team on 15 October 2012, in a 0–1 friendly loss with Ukraine. He scored twice during the 2015 UEFA European Championship qualifiers, in home wins against Norway (5–1) and Israel (3–0).

Carvalho was first summoned by full side manager Paulo Bento in November 2013 for the 2014 FIFA World Cup qualification play-offs against Sweden. He won his first cap in the second leg on the 19th, coming on as a 73rd-minute substitute in a 3–2 away victory (4–2 aggregate).

On 19 May 2014, Carvalho was named in the final 23-man squad for the 2014 World Cup held in Brazil. He made his debut in the competition on 22 June, playing the second half of the 2–2 group stage draw against the United States after replacing injured André Almeida. He featured 90 minutes in the next match to help to a 2–1 win over Ghana, but the team was eliminated on goal difference.

Carvalho played all the games and minutes at the 2015 European Under-21 Championship. He was elected player of the tournament due to his performances, even though he missed the decisive attempt in the penalty shootout in the final against Sweden, with it saved by Patrik Carlgren after a 0–0 draw in Prague.

At UEFA Euro 2016 in France, Carvalho was suspended from Portugal's semi-final victory over Wales but regained his place from Danilo Pereira in the final, a 1–0 defeat of the hosts at the Stade de France. He scored his first international goal on 13 November 2016, contributing to a 4–1 home defeat of Latvia for the 2018 World Cup qualifiers.

In May 2018, Carvalho was selected by Fernando Santos for the upcoming World Cup held in Russia. He was also picked for Euro 2020, making two appearances in a round-of-16 exit.

Carvalho was named in the final squad for the 2022 World Cup in Qatar.

== Style of play ==
Carvalho played primarily as a defensive midfielder, although he could also be deployed as a central midfielder or a central defender. Known for his passing range, accuracy, ability to control a game and composure on the pitch, he earned praise for his imposing physicality.

Despite lacking pace, Carvalho was praised for his quick decision-making, often being compared to Patrick Vieira.

== Career statistics ==
=== Club ===
As of match played 23 November 2025

Appearances and goals by club, season and competition
Club	Season	League			National cup (Note: Includes Taça de Portugal, Belgian Cup, Copa del Rey)		League cup (Note: Includes Taça da Liga)		Continental		Other		Total	
Club	Season	Division	Apps	Goals	Apps	Goals	Apps	Goals	Apps	Goals	Apps	Goals	Apps	Goals
Sporting CP	2010–11	Primeira Liga	1	0	0	0	0	0	0	0	—		1	0
Sporting CP	2013–14	Primeira Liga	29	4	1	0	3	0	0	0	—		33	4
Sporting CP	2014–15	Primeira Liga	30	1	5	0	0	0	7 (Note: Six appearances in UEFA Champions League, one appearance in UEFA Europa League)	0	—		42	1
Sporting CP	2015–16	Primeira Liga	27	2	3	1	1	0	5 (Note: Appearances in UEFA Europa League)	0	0	0	36	3
Sporting CP	2016–17	Primeira Liga	32	2	3	0	2	0	6 (Note: Appearances in UEFA Champions League)	0	—		43	2
Sporting CP	2017–18	Primeira Liga	24	1	1	0	4	0	9 (Note: Five appearances in UEFA Champions League, four appearances in UEFA Europa League)	0	—		38	1
Sporting CP	Total		143	10	13	1	10	0	27	0	0	0	193	11
Fátima (loan)	2011–12	Segunda Divisão	13	3	0	0	—		—		—		13	3
Cercle Brugge (loan)	2011–12	Belgian Pro League	19	0	1	0	—		—		—		20	1
Cercle Brugge (loan)	2012–13	Belgian Pro League	28	2	4	0	—		—		—		32	2
Cercle Brugge (loan)	Total		47	3	5	0	0	0	0	0	0	0	52	3
Betis	2018–19	La Liga	30	0	6	0	—		7	0	—		43	0
Betis	2019–20	La Liga	13	0	0	0	—		—		—		13	0
Betis	2020–21	La Liga	27	2	3	0	—		—		—		30	2
Betis	2021–22	La Liga	33	2	8	2	—		8	0	—		49	4
Betis	2022–23	La Liga	33	3	2	1	—		7	0	1 (Note: Appearance in Supercopa de España)	0	43	4
Betis	2023–24	La Liga	22	1	2	0	—		6 (Note: Four appearances in UEFA Europa League, two appearances in UEFA Europa Conference League)	0	—		30	1
Betis	2024–25	La Liga	14	0	0	0	—		1 (Note: Appearance in UEFA Conference League)	0	—		15	0
Betis	Total		172	8	21	3	0	0	29	0	1	0	223	11
Pachuca	2025–26	Liga MX	9	0	—		—		—		0	0	9	0
Career total			384	24	39	4	10	0	56	0	1	0	490	28

=== International ===
Appearances and goals by national team and year
National team	Year	Apps	Goals
Portugal	2013	1	0
Portugal	2014	10	0
Portugal	2015	4	0
Portugal	2016	14	1
Portugal	2017	11	1
Portugal	2018	13	0
Portugal	2019	6	2
Portugal	2020	5	0
Portugal	2021	5	0
Portugal	2022	11	1
Total		80	5

Scores and results list Portugal's goal tally first, score column indicates score after each Carvalho goal.

List of international goals scored by William Carvalho
No.	Date	Venue	Opponent	Score	Result	Competition
1	13 November 2016	Estádio Algarve, Faro/Loulé, Portugal	Latvia	2–1	4–1	2018 FIFA World Cup qualification
2	31 August 2017	Estádio do Bessa, Porto, Portugal	Faroe Islands	3–1	5–1	2018 FIFA World Cup qualification
3	7 September 2019	Red Star Stadium, Belgrade, Serbia	Serbia	1–0	4–2	UEFA Euro 2020 qualifying
4	10 September 2019	LFF Stadium, Vilnius, Lithuania	Lithuania	5–1	5–1	UEFA Euro 2020 qualifying
5	5 June 2022	Estádio José Alvalade, Lisbon, Portugal	Switzerland	1–0	4–0	2022–23 UEFA Nations League A

== Honours ==
Sporting CP

- Taça de Portugal: 2014–15
- Taça da Liga: 2017–18

Betis

- Copa del Rey: 2021–22

Portugal U21

- UEFA European Under-21 Championship runner-up: 2015

Portugal

- UEFA European Championship: 2016
- UEFA Nations League: 2018–19
- FIFA Confederations Cup third place: 2017

Individual

- LPFP Primeira Liga Breakthrough Player of the Year: 2013–14
- UEFA European Under-21 Championship Player of the tournament: 2015
- UEFA European Under-21 Championship Team of the tournament: 2015

Orders

- Commander of the Order of Merit
