= Abdul Khalili =

Swedish footballer (born 1992)

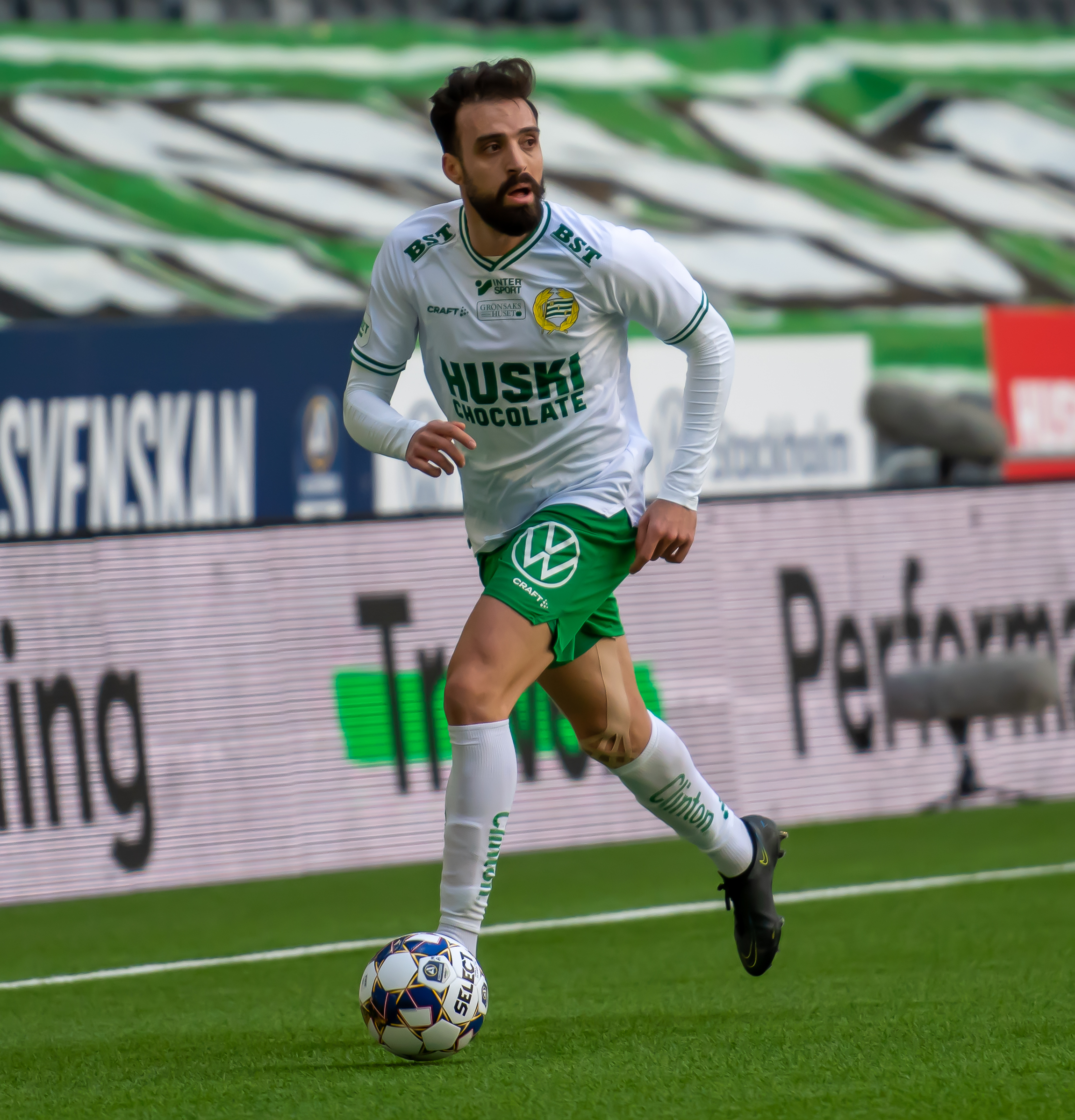
- Khalili with Hammarby IF in 2021

Personal information
- Full name: Abdul Rahman Khalili
- Date of birth: 7 June 1992 (age 34)
- Place of birth: Helsingborg, Sweden
- Height: 1.80 m (5 ft 11 in)
- Position: Central midfielder

Youth career
- Högaborgs BK

Senior career*
Years	Team	Apps	(Gls)
2008	Högaborgs BK	2	(0)
2009–2011	Helsingborgs IF	2	(0)
2009	→ Högaborgs BK (loan)	21	(9)
2011	→ IFK Värnamo (loan)	12	(1)
2012–2013	IFK Värnamo	28	(4)
2014	Helsingborgs IF	12	(1)
2014–2016	Mersin İdmanyurdu	54	(3)
2016–2018	Gençlerbirliği	57	(3)
2018–2020	Kasımpaşa	24	(4)
2020–2022	Hammarby IF	43	(6)
2022–2023	Helsingborgs IF	12	(0)
2023	Olympiakos Nicosia	11	(1)

International career^{‡}
2008–2009	Sweden U17	11	(1)
2010–2011	Sweden U19	10	(1)
2014–2015	Sweden U21	14	(0)
2016	Sweden Olympic (O.P.)	3	(0)
2015	Sweden	1	(0)
Medal record
Men's football
Representing Sweden
UEFA European Under-21 Championship
Winner	2015 Czech Republic
- * Club domestic league appearances and goals as of 2 April 2023 ‡ National team caps and goals as of 15 August 2016

Abdul Rahman "Abbe" Khalili (Arabic: عبد الرحمن خليلي; born 7 June 1992) is a Swedish professional footballer who plays as a central midfielder.

== Club career ==
=== Early career and Helsingborgs IF ===
Born and raised in Helsingborg, Khalili started playing football with local club Högaborgs BK as a youngster. He later moved to Helsingborgs IF and made his debut in Allsvenskan, Sweden's first tier, by making two appearances in 2010.

In 2011, he was loaned to IFK Värnamo in Superettan, the domestic second division. The transfer was made permanent at the end of the season. He stayed for two more years with the club, mostly competing at the bottom half of the table, but left by mutual consent at the end of 2013. In total, Khalili played 40 league games and scored five goals for IFK Värnamo.

Ahead of the 2014 season, Khalili was re-signed by Helsingborgs IF. Under manager Roar Hansen, he had his major breakthrough and established himself as a starter in Allsvenskan, playing 12 games and scoring once during the first half of the season. In the semi-final of the 2013–14 Svenska Cupen, Khalili scored as Helsingborgs IF eliminated local rival Malmö FF through a 2–0 win.

=== Years in Turkey ===
In the 2014 summer transfer window, Khalili transferred to Mersin İdman Yurdu in the Turkish Süper Lig on a three-year deal, for a reported fee of around 6 million Swedish kronor. His teammate Loret Sadiku had just completed a similar transfer. Khalili soon became a key player for Mersin İdman Yurdu. In the summer of 2015, he reportedly attracted interest from Spanish club Real Betis and other Turkish sides, but a transfer was not materialised due to a high asking price of around €5 million.

He left Mersin İdman Yurdu by mutual consent after two years. Before the start of the 2016–17 season, Khalili signed with Gençlerbirliği, linking up with compatriot Johannes Hopf, in which the side finished 8th in the table. In 2017–18, Khalili's second season with the club, Gençlerbirliği was relegated from the Süper Lig.

Before the start of the 2018–19 season, Khalili signed with Kasımpaşa on a free transfer. He stayed with the club for one and half year, mostly competing at the bottom half of the Süper Lig table, before leaving by mutual consent in January 2020.

=== Hammarby IF ===
On 20 February 2020, he signed a two-year contract with Hammarby IF in Allsvenskan. The season was postponed due to the COVID-19 pandemic, but Khalili established himself as a starter, making 27 league appearances and scoring twice, although his side disappointedly finished 8th in the table. Khalili scored in the first round of the 2020–21 UEFA Europa League against Puskás Akadémia (in a 3–0 win), before the club was eliminated from the tournament in the second round against Lech Poznań (in a 3–0 loss).

Before the start of the 2021 season, Khalili was appointed joint-captain of Hammarby together with Jeppe Andersen, but was later replaced in role by head coach Miloš Milojević. On 30 May 2021, Khalili won the 2020–21 Svenska Cupen, the main domestic cup, with Hammarby through a 5–4 win on penalties (0–0 after full-time) against BK Häcken in the final. The club reached the play-off of the 2021–22 UEFA Europa Conference League, where it was knocked out by Basel (4–4 on aggregate) after a penalty shoot-out, although Khalili scored in the first leg away. In September, Khalili's season was cut short due to a knee injury.

Khalili featured in the final of the 2021–22 Svenska Cupen, in which Hammarby lost by 4–5 on penalties to Malmö FF after the game ended in a 0–0 draw. On 12 July 2022, it was announced that Khalili had departed Hammarby at the expiration of his contract.

=== Return to Helsingborg ===
On 11 August 2022, Khalili returned to his former club Helsingborgs IF in Allsvenskan, signing a six month-contract.

=== Olympiakos Nicosia ===
On 28 January 2023, Khalili move to Cypriot First Division club Olympiakos Nicosia with contract until the end of the season.

== International career ==
Khalili was part of the Sweden under-21 squad which won the 2015 European Championship, although his attempt in the final's penalty shootout was saved by Portugal's José Sá.

He made his full international debut for Sweden on 8 September 2015 in UEFA Euro 2016 qualifier against Austria at Friends Arena that ended in a 4–1 loss.

In 2016, he represented the Sweden Olympic team at the 2016 Summer Olympics in Rio de Janeiro, Brazil.

== Personal life ==
Born in Sweden, Khalili is of Palestinian descent. He is the cousin of fellow professional footballers Imad Khalili and Moustafa Zeidan.

== Career statistics ==
=== Club ===
As of 30 May 2022

Appearances and goals by club, season and competition
Club	Season	League			Cup		Continental		Other		Total	
Club	Season	Division	Apps	Goals	Apps	Goals	Apps	Goals	Apps	Goals	Apps	Goals
Högaborgs BK	2008	Division 2 Södra Götaland	3	0	0	0	—		—		3	0
Högaborgs BK (loan)	2009	Division 2 Södra Götaland	21	9	0	0	—		—		21	9
Helsingborgs IF	2010	Allsvenskan	2	0	0	0	—		—		2	0
IFK Värnamo (loan)	2011	Superettan	12	1	0	0	—		2 (Note: Appearance in Relegation play-offs)	0	14	1
IFK Värnamo	2012	Superettan	16	4	4	0	—		2	0	22	4
IFK Värnamo	2013	Superettan	12	0	0	0	—		—		12	0
IFK Värnamo	Total		28	4	4	0	0	0	2	0	34	4
Helsingborgs IF	2014	Allsvenskan	12	1	6	1	—		—		18	2
Mersin	2014–15	Süper Lig	30	2	7	0	—		—		37	2
Mersin	2015–16	Süper Lig	24	1	0	0	—		—		24	1
Mersin	Total		54	3	7	0	0	0	0	0	61	3
Gençlerbirliği	2016–17	Süper Lig	29	1	4	1	—		—		33	2
Gençlerbirliği	2017–18	Süper Lig	28	2	5	0	—		—		33	2
Gençlerbirliği	Total		57	3	9	1	0	0	0	0	66	4
Kasımpaşa	2018–19	Süper Lig	8	2	1	0	—		—		9	2
Kasımpaşa	2019–20	Süper Lig	16	2	2	0	—		—		18	2
Kasımpaşa	Total		24	4	3	0	0	0	0	0	27	4
Hammarby IF	2020	Allsvenskan	27	2	3	0	2 (Note: Appearances in UEFA Europa League)	1	—		32	3
Hammarby IF	2021	Allsvenskan	13	4	4	1	5 (Note: Appearances in UEFA Europa Conference League)	1	—		22	6
Hammarby IF	2022	Allsvenskan	3	0	1	0	—		—		4	0
Hammarby IF	Total		43	6	8	1	7	2	0	0	58	9
Helsingborgs IF	2022	Allsvenskan	12	0	0	0	—		—		12	0
Olympiakos Nicosia	2022–23	Cypriot First Division	11	1	4	0	—		—		15	1
Career total			279	32	41	3	7	2	4	0	331	37

=== International ===
Appearances and goals by national team and year
National team	Year	Apps	Goals
Sweden	2015	1	0
Total		1	0

== Honours ==
Helsingborgs IF

- Svenska Cupen: 2010
- Svenska Supercupen: 2011

Hammarby IF

- Svenska Cupen: 2020–21

Sweden U21

- UEFA European Under-21 Championship: 2015
