= 2022 Sarpsborg 08 FF season =

Sarpsborg 08
2022 season
- Chairman: Hans Petter Arnesen
- Head coach: Stefan Billborn
- Stadium: Sarpsborg Stadion
- Eliteserien: 8th
- 2021 Norwegian Cup: Quarter-finals
- 2022 Norwegian Cup: Second round
- Top goalscorer: League: Tobias Heintz (15); All: Tobias Heintz (16)
Home colours	Away colours

The 2022 season was Sarpsborg 08 FF's 14th season in existence and the club's 10th consecutive season in the top flight of Norwegian football. In addition to the domestic league, Sarpsborg 08 FF participated in this season's edition of the Norwegian Football Cup.

== Players ==
=== First team squad ===
As of 9 October 2022

Note: Flags indicate national team as defined under FIFA eligibility rules; some limited exceptions apply. Players may hold more than one non-FIFA nationality.

No.	Pos.	Nation	Player
1	GK	NOR	Simen Vidtun Nilsen
2	MF	NOR	Leo Bech Hermansen
3	DF	NOR	Jørgen Horn
4	DF	NOR	Bjørn Inge Utvik
5	DF	NOR	Magnar Ødegaard
6	MF	NOR	Martin Høyland
7	MF	NOR	Ole Jørgen Halvorsen
8	FW	SWE	Guillermo Molins
10	FW	MLI	Aboubacar Konté
11	MF	SWE	Simon Tibbling
13	MF	DEN	Anders Hagelskjær (on loan from AaB)
14	FW	MLI	Amadou Camara
15	FW	NOR	Steffen Lie Skålevik
16	DF	NOR	Joachim Thomassen
17	MF	NOR	Joachim Soltvedt
18	MF	GAB	Serge-Junior Martinsson Ngouali

No.	Pos.	Nation	Player
19	MF	SEN	Laurent Mendy
20	MF	SWE	Anton Salétros
21	GK	NOR	Anders Kristiansen
22	FW	NOR	Kristian Opseth
23	FW	DEN	Gustav Mogensen
25	MF	DEN	Mikkel Maigaard
26	FW	BFA	Moubarak Compaoré
27	DF	NOR	Markus Olsvik Welinder
29	MF	DEN	Victor Torp
30	FW	SWE	Gustav Engvall (on loan from Mechelen)
31	DF	DEN	Anton Skipper
32	DF	NOR	Eirik Wichne
40	GK	NOR	Leander Øy
41	MF	NOR	Tobias Heintz (on loan from Häcken)
44	MF	NOR	Jesper Wichstrøm Johansen
72	MF	NOR	Sander Christiansen

== Transfers ==
=== Winter ===
In: Note: Flags indicate national team as defined under FIFA eligibility rules; some limited exceptions apply. Players may hold more than one non-FIFA nationality.

No.	Pos.	Nation	Player
6	MF	NOR	Martin Høyland (from Stabæk)
15	FW	NOR	Steffen Lie Skålevik (loan return from Sogndal)
18	MF	SWE	Serge-Junior Martinsson Ngouali (from (Croatia) Gorica)
19	MF	SEN	Laurent Mendy (loan return from Strømmen)
31	DF	DEN	Anton Skipper (from (Denmark) Brøndby)
40	GK	NOR	Leander Øy (promoted from junior squad)
41	MF	NOR	Tobias Heintz (on loan from (Sweden) Häcken)
–	MF	ISL	Emil Pálsson (loan return from Sogndal)

Out: Note: Flags indicate national team as defined under FIFA eligibility rules; some limited exceptions apply. Players may hold more than one non-FIFA nationality.

No.	Pos.	Nation	Player
6	DF	NOR	Nicolai Næss (to Stabæk)
8	FW	NOR	Mohamed Ofkir (to Sandefjord)
15	MF	NOR	Gaute Vetti (to Bodø/Glimt)
18	MF	NOR	Sebastian Jarl (to Kristiansund)
24	DF	GUI	Mikael Dyrestam (to (Belgium) Seraing)
28	DF	CIV	Benjamin Karamoko (to (Belgium) Charleroi)
29	FW	MLI	Ibrahima Koné (to (France) Lorient)
30	FW	NOR	Mustafa Abdellaoue (retired)
77	MF	CRO	Dario Čanađija (to Aalesund)

=== Summer ===
In: Note: Flags indicate national team as defined under FIFA eligibility rules; some limited exceptions apply. Players may hold more than one non-FIFA nationality.

No.	Pos.	Nation	Player
2	DF	NOR	Elias Kringberg Haug (promoted from junior squad)
10	FW	MLI	Aboubacar Konté (loan return from (Portugal) Nacional)
11	MF	SWE	Simon Tibbling (from (Denmark) Randers)
13	DF	DEN	Anders Hagelskjær (from (Denmark) AaB)
23	FW	DEN	Gustav Mogensen (from (England) Brentford)
29	MF	DEN	Victor Torp (from (Denmark) Midtjylland)
72	MF	NOR	Sander Christiansen (from (Germany) Borussia Mönchengladbach II)
74	FW	NOR	Aridon Racaj (promoted from junior squad)

Out: Note: Flags indicate national team as defined under FIFA eligibility rules; some limited exceptions apply. Players may hold more than one non-FIFA nationality.

No.	Pos.	Nation	Player
2	DF	NOR	Leo Bech Hermansen (to Kjelsås)
10	FW	FRA	Rashad Muhammed (to (Turkey) Ankara Keçiörengücü)
11	MF	NOR	Jonathan Lindseth (to (Bulgaria) CSKA Sofia)
14	MF	MLI	Amadou Camara (on loan to (Senegal) Oslo FA)
19	MF	SEN	Laurent Mendy (on loan to (Senegal) Oslo FA)
–	MF	ISL	Emil Pálsson (retired)

== Competitions ==
=== Eliteserien ===
==== Results summary ====
Overall								Home						Away					
Pld	W	D	L	GF	GA	GD	Pts	W	D	L	GF	GA	GD	W	D	L	GF	GA	GD
30	12	5	13	57	54	+3	41	6	3	6	27	24	+3	6	2	7	30	30	0

Last updated: 13 November 2022.

==== Results by round ====
Round	1	2	3	4	5	6	7	8	9	10	11	12	13	14	15	16	17	18	19	20	21	22	23	24	25	26	27	28	29	30
Ground	H	A	H	A	H	A	H	H	A	H	A	H	A	H	A	H	A	H	A	A	H	A	H	A	H	A	H	A	H	A
Result	L	W	D	W	W	L	W	L	W	W	L	W	L	L	L	L	L	L	L	L	W	W	W	D	W	W	D	D	D	W
Position	11	8	9	3	3	3	7	8	7	4	7	3	8	9	11	12	12	14	14	14	13	11	11	11	9	7	8	8	8	8

A = Away; H = Home; W = Win; D = Draw; L = Loss

==== Matches ====
3 April 2022 1	Sarpsborg 08	0–1	Viking	Sarpsborg
18:00 CEST (UTC+2)		Report	Tripić 88'	Stadium: Sarpsborg Stadion; Attendance: 4,307; Referee: Christian Moen

10 April 2022 2	Kristiansund	2–3	Sarpsborg 08	Kristiansund
18:00 CEST (UTC+2)	Diop 52'; Mucolli 79'	Report	Salétros 1'; Maigaard 32'; Molins 42'	Stadium: Kristiansund Stadion; Attendance: 3,636; Referee: Kristoffer Hagenes

18 April 2022 3	Sarpsborg 08	1–1	Rosenborg	Sarpsborg
18:00 CEST (UTC+2)	Heintz 45+1'	Report	Vecchia 64'	Stadium: Sarpsborg Stadion; Attendance: 5,506; Referee: Svein Oddvar Moen

24 April 2022 4	Tromsø	2–5	Sarpsborg 08	Tromsø
18:00 CEST (UTC+2)	Gundersen 45'; Antonsen 75'	Report	Heintz 14'; Lindseth 34'; Molins 48'; Maigaard 52', 85'	Stadium: Alfheim Stadion; Attendance: 2,005; Referee: Kai Erik Steen

7 May 2022 5	Sarpsborg 08	1–0	Odd	Sarpsborg
16:00 CEST (UTC+2)	Opseth 63'	Report		Stadium: Sarpsborg Stadion; Attendance: 4,765; Referee: Mohammad Usman Aslam

16 May 2022 6	Lillestrøm	1–0	Sarpsborg 08	Lillestrøm
18:00 CEST (UTC+2)	Ibrahimaj 67'	Report		Stadium: Åråsen Stadion; Attendance: 9,394; Referee: Tore Hansen

22 May 2022 7	Sarpsborg 08	1–2	Aalesund	Sarpsborg
18:00 CEST (UTC+2)	Molins 13'	Report	Haugen 34', 90+2'	Stadium: Sarpsborg stadion Attendance: 4,158; Referee: Rohit Saggi

26 May 2022 8	Sarpsborg 08	1–2	Molde	Sarpsborg
20:00 CEST (UTC+2)	Heintz 65'	Report	Grødem 50'; Fofana 68'	Stadium: Sarpsborg Stadion; Attendance: 4,635; Referee: Christian Moen

29 May 2022 9	Jerv	0–5	Sarpsborg 08	Grimstad
18:00 CEST (UTC+2)		Report	Maigaard 19'; Soltvedt 26', 60'; Ødegaard 90'; Molins 90+2'	Stadium: J.J. Ugland Stadion – Levermyr; Attendance: 2,253; Referee: Mohammad Usman Aslam

18 June 2022 10	Sarpsborg 08	5–1	Strømsgodset	Sarpsborg
16:00 CEST (UTC+2)	Molins 14'; Heintz 18', 90+3'; Salétros 38' (pen.), 45' (pen.)	Report	Enersen 45+2'	Stadium: Sarpsborg Stadion; Attendance: 4,770; Referee: Sivert Øksnes Amland

26 June 2022 11	HamKam	3–2	Sarpsborg 08	Hamar
18:00 CEST (UTC+2)	Melgalvis 17'; Eriksen 44'; Enkerud 65'	Report	Kuruçay 14' (o.g.); Jonathan Lindseth 42'	Stadium: Briskeby Stadion; Attendance: 3,902; Referee: Espen Eskås

3 July 2022 12	Sarpsborg 08	4–3	Sandefjord	Sarpsborg
18:00 CEST (UTC+2)	Maigaard 8', 19'; Salétros 54' (o.g.); Ngouali 70'	Report	Ruud Tveter 21'; Vega 44'; Ofkir 73'	Stadium: Sarpsborg Stadion; Attendance: 4,094; Referee: Mohammad Usman Aslam

9 July 2022 13	Bodø/Glimt	4–1	Sarpsborg 08	Bodø
16:00 CEST (UTC+2)	Vetlesen 21'; Saltnes 44'; Boniface 63', 90+1' (pen.)	Report	Skålevik 1'	Stadium: Aspmyra Stadion; Attendance: 5,064; Referee: Tom Harald Hagen

17 July 2022 14	Sarpsborg 08	0–1	Vålerenga	Sarpsborg
18:00 CEST (UTC+2)		Report	Layouni 30'	Stadium: Sarpsborg Stadion; Attendance: 5,019; Referee: Marius Hansen Grøtta

24 July 2022 15	Haugesund	3–1	Sarpsborg 08	Haugesund
18:00 CEST (UTC+2)	Zafeiris 27'; Sande 45'; Njie 83'	Report	Soltvedt 18'	Stadium: Haugesund Stadion; Attendance: 3,740; Referee: Ola Hobber Nilsen

31 July 2022 16	Sarpsborg 08	0–2	Lillestrøm	Sarpsborg
15:30 CEST (UTC+2)		Report	Helland 76' (pen.); Friðjónsson 84'	Stadium: Sarpsborg Stadion; Attendance: 4,717; Referee: Rohit Saggi

7 August 2022 17	Strømsgodset	3–1	Sarpsborg 08	Drammen
18:00 CEST (UTC+2)	Vilsvik 28'; Stengel 40'; Boahene 81'	Report	Torp 58'	Stadium: Marienlyst Stadion; Attendance: 4,422; Referee: Marius Hansen Grøtta

12 August 2022 18	Sarpsborg 08	1–4	Bodø/Glimt	Sarpsborg
19:00 CEST (UTC+2)	Heintz 77'	Report	Vetlesen 39'; Pellegrino 45', 85'; Salvesen 65'	Stadium: Sarpsborg Stadion; Attendance: 4,898; Referee: Espen Eskås

20 August 2022 19	Odd	1–0	Sarpsborg 08	Skien
18:00 CEST (UTC+2)	Jevtović 25'	Report		Stadium: Skagerak Arena; Attendance: 3,380; Referee: Daniel Higraff

28 August 2022 20	Molde	4–1	Sarpsborg 08	Molde
18:00 CEST (UTC+2)	Hussain 12'; Horn 28' (o.g.); Brynhildsen 42'; Grødem 79'	Report	Heintz 23'	Stadium: Aker Stadion; Attendance: 6,045; Referee: Kai Erik Steen

4 September 2022 21	Sarpsborg 08	2–1	HamKam	Sarpsborg
18:00 CEST (UTC+2)	Skålevik 90+3'; Heintz 90+6' (pen.)	Report	Hernandez-Foster 5'	Stadium: Sarpsborg Stadion; Attendance: 5,238; Referee: Sivert Øksnes Amland

11 September 2022 22	Aalesund	1–3	Sarpsborg 08	Ålesund
18:00 CEST (UTC+2)	Ebiye 74'	Report	Maigaard 24'; Golubović 44' (o.g.); Tibbling 56'	Stadium: Color Line Stadion; Attendance: 4,933; Referee: Marius Hansen Grøtta

18 September 2022 23	Sarpsborg 08	4–3	Jerv	Sarpsborg
18:00 CEST (UTC+2)	Salétros 11'; Heintz 24', 69', 73'	Report	Brenden 5'; Tjærandsen-Skau 26'; Håkans 36'	Stadium: Sarpsborg Stadion; Attendance: 5,831; Referee: Christian Moen

2 October 2022 24	Sandefjord	1–1	Sarpsborg 08	Sandefjord
17:00 CEST (UTC+2)	Ofkir 44'	Report	Engvall 78'	Stadium: Release Arena; Attendance: 3,283; Referee: Tom Harald Hagen

8 October 2022 25	Sarpsborg 08	4–0	Haugesund	Sarpsborg
18:00 CEST (UTC+2)	Torp 9'; Heintz 17', 33'; Skålevik 79'	Report		Stadium: Sarpsborg Stadion; Attendance: 4,651; Referee: Ola Hobber Nilsen

16 October 2022 26	Viking	0–1	Sarpsborg 08	Stavanger
17:00 CEST (UTC+2)		Report	Heintz 39'	Stadium: Viking Stadion; Attendance: 7,136; Referee: Marius Lien

23 October 2022 27	Sarpsborg 08	1–1	Tromsø	Sarpsborg
16:00 CEST (UTC+2)	Opseth 83'	Report	Kitolano 76'	Stadium: Sarpsborg Stadion; Attendance: 5,017; Referee: Svein Tore Sinnes

29 October 2022 28	Vålerenga	3–3	Sarpsborg 08	Oslo
18:00 CEST (UTC+2)	Hedenstad 19'; Layouni 45+2'; Hedenstad 66'	Report	Tibbling 4'; Maigaard 17'; Molins 68'	Stadium: Intility Arena; Attendance: 5,989; Referee: Tom Harald Hagen

6 November 2022 29	Sarpsborg 08	2–2	Kristiansund	Sarpsborg
17:00 CET (UTC+1)	Skålevik 21'; Soltvedt 76'	Report	Diop 23'; Ulvestad 45'	Stadium: Sarpsborg Stadion; Attendance: 4,101; Referee: Sivert Øksnes Amland

13 November 2022 30	Rosenborg	2–3	Sarpsborg 08	Trondheim
17:00 CET (UTC+1)	Rogers 35'; Cornic 89'	Report	Heintz 6'; Maigaard 37'; Cornic 90+3' (o.g.)	Stadium: Lerkendal Stadion; Attendance: 15,157; Referee: Espen Eskås

==== Table ====
Pos	Team	Pld	W	D	L	GF	GA	GD	Pts
6	Vålerenga	30	13	5	12	52	49	+3	44
7	Tromsø	30	10	13	7	46	49	−3	43
8	Sarpsborg 08	30	12	5	13	57	54	+3	41
9	Aalesund	30	10	9	11	32	45	−13	39
10	Haugesund	30	10	8	12	42	46	−4	38

Source: Football Association of Norway (in Norwegian)
Rules for classification: 1) Points; 2) Goal difference; 3) Goals scored; 4) Head-to-head points; 5) Head-to-head goal difference; 6) Head-to-head goals scored.

=== Norwegian Football Cup ===
==== 2021 ====
13 March 2022 Fourth round	Åsane	0–5	Sarpsborg 08	Bergen
17:00 CET (UTC+1)		Report	Wichne 21'; Molins 23', 36', 45'; Halvorsen 33'	Stadium: Åsane Arena; Attendance: 858; Referee: Tore Hansen

20 March 2022 Quarter-finals	Molde	4–2	Sarpsborg 08	Molde
16:15 CET (UTC+1)	Brynhildsen 21'; Eikrem 48'; Andersen 80'; Linnes 90+2'	Report	Maigaard 5'; Skålevik 76'	Stadium: Aker Stadion; Attendance: 3,309; Referee: Rohit Saggi

==== 2022 ====
19 May 2022 First round	Østsiden	0–7	Sarpsborg 08	Fredrikstad
18:45 CEST (UTC+2)		Report	Heintz 35'; Maigaard 45'; Skålevik 48'; Opseth 58'; Camara 70', 76'	Stadium: Østsiden Idrettsplass; Referee: Ole-Alexander Ekeli Valen

22 June 2022 Second round	Moss	1–0	Sarpsborg 08	Moss
18:00 CEST (UTC+2)	Ali 55'	Report		Stadium: Melløs Stadion; Attendance: 1,176; Referee: Magnus Koløy
