= Victor Lindelöf =

Swedish footballer (born 1994)

- Lindelöf with Sweden in 2026

Personal information
- Full name: Victor Jörgen Nilsson Lindelöf
- Date of birth: 17 July 1994 (age 32)
- Place of birth: Västerås, Sweden
- Height: 1.87 m (6 ft 2 in)
- Position: Centre-back

Team information
- Current team: Aston Villa
- Number: 3

Youth career
- IK Franke
- Västerås IK
- 2007–2009: Västerås SK
- 2012–2013: Benfica

Senior career*
Years	Team	Apps	(Gls)
2009–2012	Västerås SK	50	(0)
2012–2015	Benfica B	96	(4)
2013–2017	Benfica	48	(2)
2017–2025	Manchester United	194	(4)
2025–	Aston Villa	27	(0)

International career^{‡}
2010–2011	Sweden U17	5	(0)
2012–2013	Sweden U19	17	(0)
2014–2015	Sweden U21	13	(0)
2016–	Sweden	86	(3)
Medal record
Men's football
Representing Sweden
UEFA European Under-21 Championship
Winner	2015 Czech Republic
- * Club domestic league appearances and goals as of 8 November 2026 ‡ National team caps and goals as of 23:55, 17 November 2026 (UTC)

Victor Jörgen Nilsson Lindelöf (Note: Swedish: [ˈvɪk.tɔr ˈlɪn.dɛˌløːv]) (born 17 July 1994) is a Swedish professional footballer who plays as a centre-back for Premier League club Aston Villa and captains the Sweden national team.

Lindelöf began his career in Sweden at Västerås SK, making his debut in October 2009. In December 2011, he agreed to move to Benfica in Portugal, initially representing the club at youth and B levels. After making his first-team debut in September 2013, he continued to appear for the club at B level, while also winning three Primeira Liga titles. He joined Premier League side Manchester United in July 2017, winning the EFL Cup in 2023, and also the FA Cup in 2024, before he departed the club at the end of the 2024–25 season. Following his departure from Manchester United, Lindelöf joined Aston Villa in September 2025, winning the Europa League in 2026.

Lindelöf has represented Sweden at under-17, under-19, under-21, and senior levels. He was a part of the winning squad of the 2015 UEFA European Under-21 Championship. He made his senior international debut in March 2016 and represented his country at UEFA Euro 2016, the 2018 FIFA World Cup, UEFA Euro 2020, and 2026 FIFA World Cup.

== Club career ==
=== Early career ===
Lindelöf played for numerous Västerås-based clubs in his youth such as IK Franke, Västerås IK and Västerås SK.

=== Västerås SK ===
In October 2009, at the age of 15, Lindelöf made his first-team debut for Västerås SK, when the team beat BK Forward 3–0 in the last round of the 2009 Division 1 Norra season. In the following season, he helped his team advance a step higher in the Swedish league system, as they were promoted to the second highest league. In 2011, he travelled to England to have a trial with Stoke City, but they did not make an offer for him.

=== Benfica ===
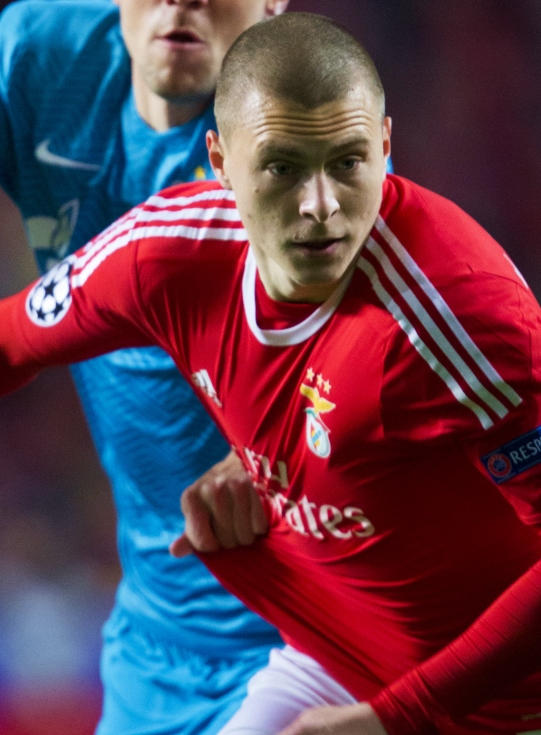
Lindelöf playing for Benfica in 2016

On 1 December 2011, Lindelöf agreed to join Portuguese club Benfica in the summer of 2012, and on 8 June 2015, the contract was extended until 2020. In the 2012–13 season, he played for the youth team and won the Portuguese under-19 championship. On 19 October 2013, he debuted for the first-team in a 1–0 Portuguese Cup win against CD Cinfães, playing the full match. In the 2013–14 season, he scored 2 goals in 33 matches for the reserve team.

In the 2015–16 season, he returned to the first-team in a 1–0 win against Nacional in the Taça da Liga. On 16 February 2016, he played the entire match for Benfica in a 1–0 home win against Zenit Saint Petersburg in the first leg of UEFA Champions League's round of 16. Four days later, he scored his first goal for Benfica, in a 3–1 Primeira Liga victory at Paços de Ferreira. On 28 May 2017, he played in the Taça de Portugal final, which Benfica won over Vitória de Guimarães (2–1). By the time he was leaving Benfica he had won three Primeira Liga titles, two Taça de Portugal titles and one Taça da Liga title.

=== Manchester United ===
==== 2017–18 season ====
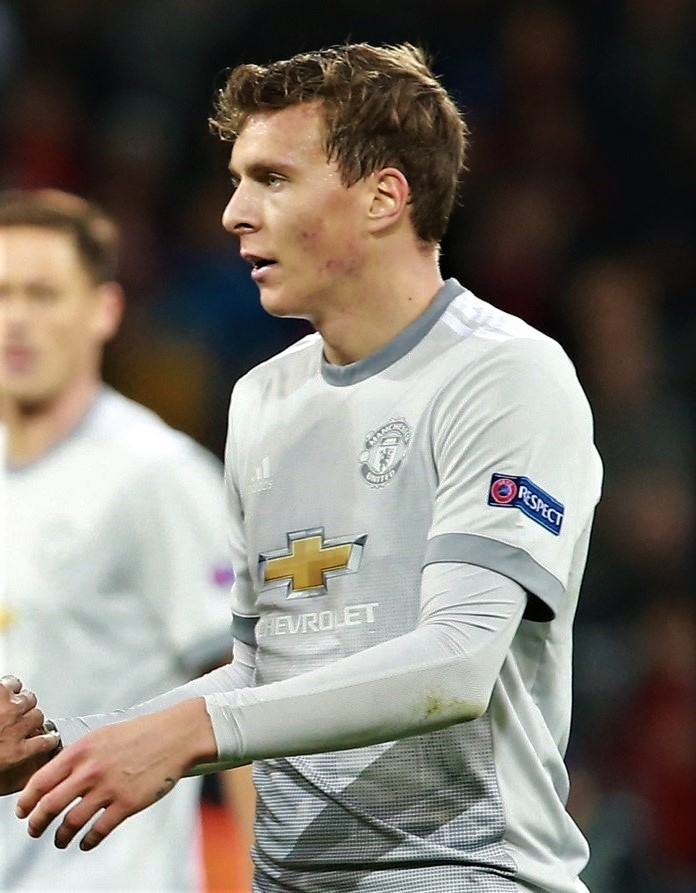
Lindelöf playing for Manchester United in 2017

On 10 June 2017, Manchester United announced that they had agreed a deal with Benfica to sign Lindelöf for a fee of €35 million (with a potential €10 million in add-ons), pending the agreement of personal terms and the player passing a medical. Due to a previous sell-on clause, €3 million of the transfer fee was given to former club Västerås SK, making them amongst the richest clubs in Sweden at the time. Lindelöf passed his medical at the Trafford Training Centre on 14 June, with the Swede signing a four-year contract with the option of an extra year; Manchester United announced that the contract would begin on 1 July.

He made his official debut for the club against Real Madrid in the 2017 UEFA Super Cup; however, it was more than two months before his Premier League debut, brought on during added time against Liverpool on 14 October. He was limited to just 17 Premier League matches, starting 13 of them, due to Jose Mourinho's preference of playing a defensive partnership of Chris Smalling and Phil Jones.

==== 2018–19 season ====
In the 2018–19 season, Lindelöf became Mourinho's preferred centre-back and was playing more often than he did in the previous season. He played the full 90 minutes in the first match of the season on 11 August 2018 against Leicester City, which ended in a 2–1 home win. He further went on to start in 11 out of 13 league matches before Jose Mourinho was sacked in December 2018 and replaced with Ole Gunnar Solskjær. Lindelöf scored his first goal for Manchester United on 29 January 2019, scoring their second goal in a 2–2 league draw at home to Burnley.

==== 2019–20 season ====
In September 2019, Lindelöf signed a new contract until 2024, with the option of a further year. On 1 December 2019, he played 90 minutes and scored his only goal in the season in a league match against Aston Villa that ended 2–2 draw. He ended the season making 35 appearances and scoring one goal in the league, the third most in league appearances within the club that season coming behind Harry Maguire and David de Gea who both played all 38 matches, forming a defensive partnership with Maguire in the process.

==== 2020–21 season ====
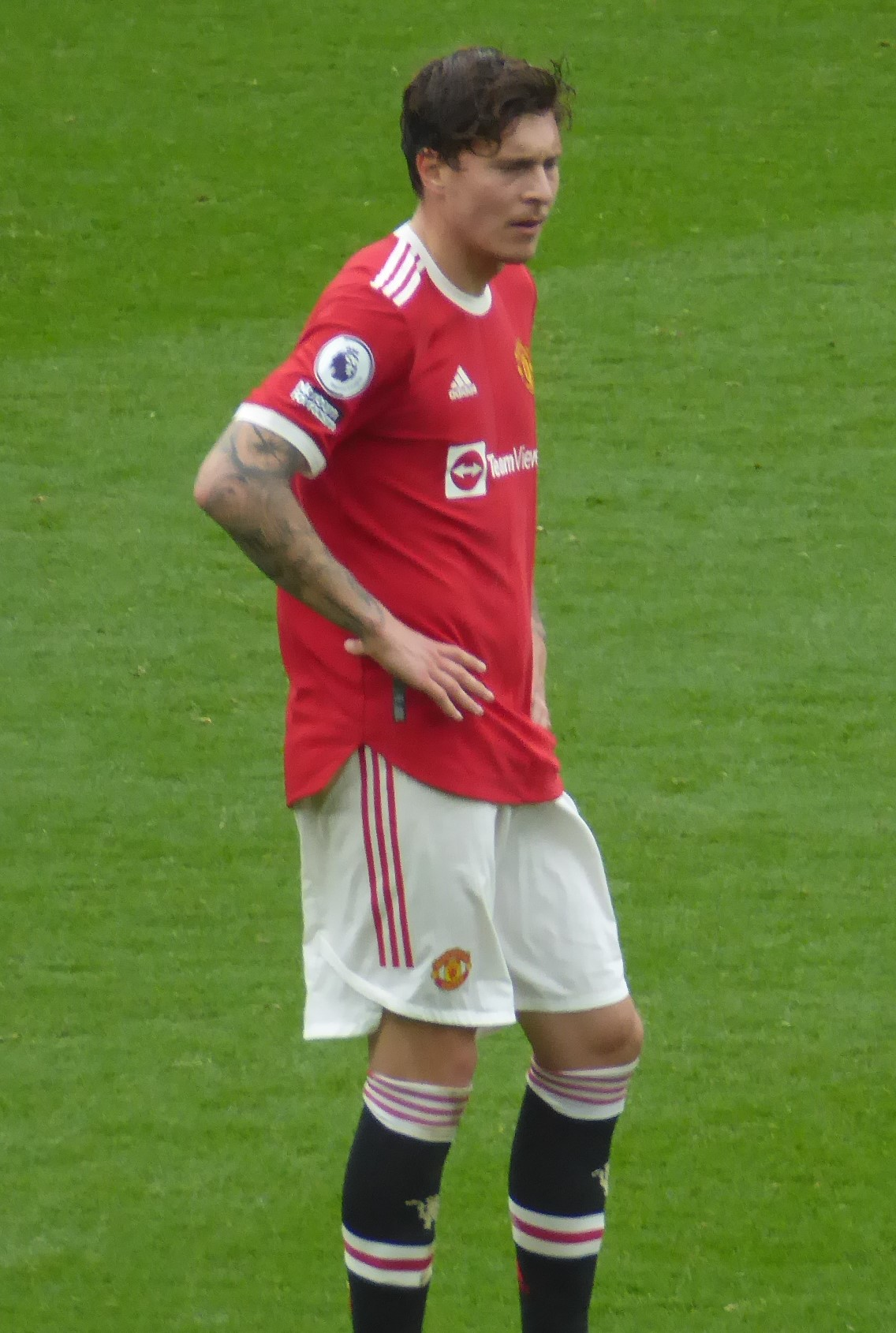
Lindelöf playing for Manchester United in 2021

On 20 December 2020, Lindelöf scored his first goal of the 2020–21 season in a 6–2 home win against Leeds United. He played the full 90 minutes on 2 February 2021 in Manchester United's Premier League record-equalling 9–0 home win against Southampton. On 26 May 2021, he played the full 120 minutes as Manchester United lost in the 2021 UEFA Europa League final to Villarreal after a 10–11 penalty shoot-out in which Lindelöf scored United's 10th penalty kick.

==== 2022–23 season ====
Lindelöf spent the majority of the season serving as a backup to Lisandro Martínez and Raphaël Varane, alongside Harry Maguire, until the centre-back pairing both fell injured in a 2–2 UEFA Europa League draw with Sevilla in April. Promoted to first-choice, he would play the full 120 minutes of Manchester United's FA Cup semi-final victory against Brighton & Hove Albion on 23 April, where he scored the winning penalty in the shootout which ended 7–6 in United's favour, securing a place in the final against Manchester City. He also played the FA Cup-final against Manchester City on 3 June, which City won 2–1. At the conclusion of the season, Lindelöf was the most accurate passer in the league, with a pass completion rate of 93.1%.

==== 2023–24 season ====
On 11 November 2023, Lindelöf scored his first goal for Manchester United since December 2020 in a 1–0 win over Luton Town at Old Trafford. In December 2023, Manchester United announced they had triggered their option to extend Victor Lindelöf's contract by a year, until July 2025.

==== 2024–25 season ====
On 2 March 2025, Lindelöf missed a penalty in a fifth round FA Cup penalty shootout against Fulham. Lindelof's kick was too central, allowing Fulham to knock Manchester United out of the competition.

In May 2025, Manchester United announced that Lindelöf would be leaving once his contract expired at the end of the 2024–25 season.

=== Aston Villa ===
On 1 September 2025, Lindelöf joined Aston Villa on a free transfer. On 13 September 2025, he made his Aston Villa debut as a second-half substitute in a 0–0 away draw at Everton, playing in midfield. After an injury to Pau Torres, with Tyrone Mings already unavailable through injury, Lindelöf started his first league game for Villa on 14 December 2025, a 3–2 victory away at West Ham United, in which he assisted Morgan Rogers' winning goal. On 20 May 2026, Lindelöf started in the 2026 UEFA Europa League final, which Aston Villa won 3–0.

On 10 November 2026, Aston Villa announced that they had extended Lindelöf's contract, keeping him at Villa until 2028.

== International career ==
=== Youth team ===
Lindelöf made his debut for the under-21 team on 14 October 2014, in the second leg of the qualification play-offs against France.

Although Lindelöf was not named in the final squad for the UEFA European Under-21 Championship, on 15 June 2015 he replaced defender Emil Krafth who was ruled out of the tournament after a back injury. He made his debut in the tournament in the first game against Italy. On 30 June 2015 he successfully converted Sweden's fifth and last penalty against Portugal in a 4–3 penalty shoot-out victory in the final to become European under-21 champion. He was named in the Team of the Tournament.

=== Senior team ===
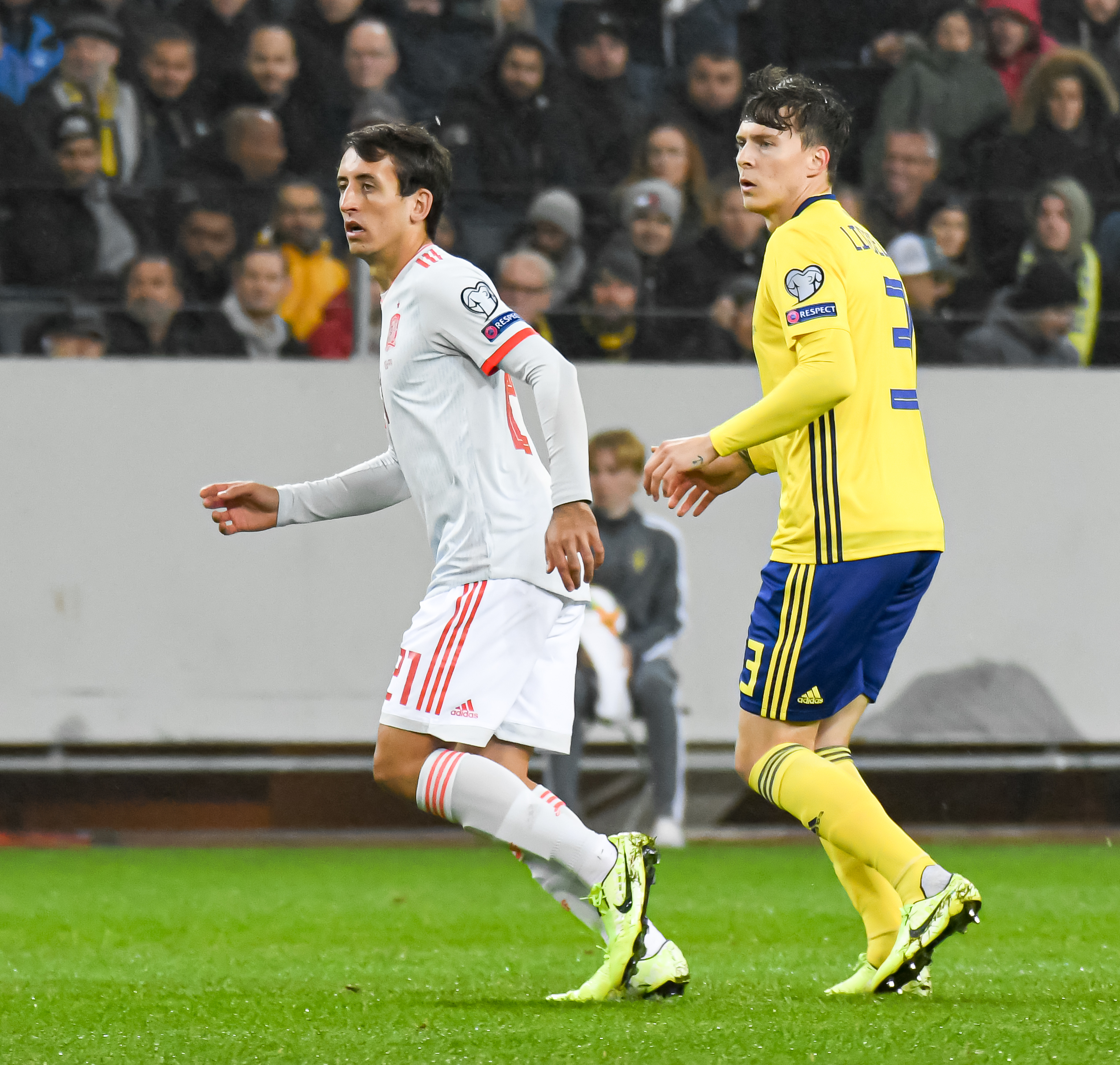
Lindelöf (right) playing for Sweden in 2019

==== Debut ====
Lindelöf received his first call up to the senior Sweden squad in March 2016 for friendlies against Turkey and Czech Republic. He debuted for the country in a 2–1 away loss to Turkey on 24 March 2016.

==== UEFA Euro 2016 ====
He was selected in Sweden's squad for UEFA Euro 2016 in France, where he started all three of their group games, although Sweden failed to progress to the round of 16. Lindelöf was also selected in Sweden's 35-man provisional squad for the 2016 Summer Olympics in Rio de Janeiro, but was prevented from participating in the tournament by his club Benfica, who believed that the involvement of their players in the Olympics would harm their chances for the following season.

==== 2018 FIFA World Cup ====
Lindelöf scored his first international goal for Sweden in a 3–0 win over Bulgaria in a 2018 FIFA World Cup qualifier at Friends Arena in Stockholm on 10 October 2016.

In May 2018, he was named in Sweden's 23-man squad for the FIFA World Cup in Russia. Lindelöf missed the first game against South Korea due to illness, but was a regular starter in defense alongside fellow centre-back Andreas Granqvist for the remainder of the tournament. Lindelöf and Sweden were eliminated in the quarter final against England.

==== UEFA Euro 2020 ====
In March 2019, Lindelöf was called up for Sweden's UEFA Euro 2020 qualifying matches against Romania and Norway. However, he chose to withdraw from the squad, citing personal reasons, namely the birth of his first child. He was replaced by Anton Tinnerholm.

He represented Sweden at UEFA Euro 2020, and appeared in all four games as Sweden reached the round of 16 before being eliminated by Ukraine.

On 11 August 2021, Lindelöf was named as Andreas Granqvist's successor as captain by Sweden coach Janne Andersson following Granqvist's retirement after the tournament.

==== 2026 FIFA World Cup ====
Lindelöf captained Sweden at the 2026 FIFA World Cup and played in all four games before Sweden was eliminated by France in the round of 32.

== Personal life ==
Following his move to Manchester United in 2017, Lindelöf announced his engagement to his long-time girlfriend Maja Nilsson. They got married at the end of May 2018, in Sweden. In March 2019, their first son was born. Their second son was born in October 2021.

While in his home city in August 2020, Lindelöf witnessed the robbery of a 90-year-old woman by a man on a bike; Lindelöf chased the thief on foot and managed to catch him, holding him until the police arrived. The police later thanked Lindelöf for his "quick and wise intervention".

In January 2022, while Lindelöf was playing the full 90 minutes against Brentford in a 3–1 win, his Manchester home was broken into by intruders whilst he was on the pitch. His wife and two children were at home but hid and were left unharmed.

== Career statistics ==
=== Club ===
As of match played 8 November 2026

Appearances and goals by club, season and competition
Club	Season	League			National cup (Note: Includes Svenska Cupen, Taça de Portugal, FA Cup)		League cup (Note: Includes Taça da Liga, EFL Cup)		Europe		Other		Total	
Club	Season	Division	Apps	Goals	Apps	Goals	Apps	Goals	Apps	Goals	Apps	Goals	Apps	Goals
Västerås SK	2009	Division 1 Norra	1	0	—		—		—		—		1	0
Västerås SK	2010	Division 1 Norra	9	0	—		—		—		—		9	0
Västerås SK	2011	Superettan	27	0	1	0	—		—		—		28	0
Västerås SK	2012	Division 1 Norra	13	0	—		—		—		—		13	0
Västerås SK	Total		50	0	1	0	—		—		—		51	0
Benfica B	2012–13	Segunda Liga	15	0	—		—		—		—		15	0
Benfica B	2013–14	Segunda Liga	33	2	—		—		—		—		33	2
Benfica B	2014–15	Segunda Liga	41	2	—		—		—		—		41	2
Benfica B	2015–16	LigaPro	7	0	—		—		—		—		7	0
Benfica B	Total		96	4	—		—		—		—		96	4
Benfica	2013–14	Primeira Liga	1	0	1	0	0	0	0	0	—		2	0
Benfica	2014–15	Primeira Liga	0	0	1	0	0	0	0	0	0	0	1	0
Benfica	2015–16	Primeira Liga	15	1	0	0	4	0	4 (Note: Appearances in UEFA Champions League)	0	0	0	23	1
Benfica	2016–17	Primeira Liga	32	1	4	0	2	0	8	0	1 (Note: Appearance in Supertaça Cândido de Oliveira)	0	47	1
Benfica	Total		48	2	6	0	6	0	12	0	1	0	73	2
Manchester United	2017–18	Premier League	17	0	3	0	3	0	5	0	1 (Note: Appearances in UEFA Super Cup)	0	29	0
Manchester United	2018–19	Premier League	30	1	3	0	0	0	7	0	—		40	1
Manchester United	2019–20	Premier League	35	1	5	0	3	0	4 (Note: Appearances in UEFA Europa League)	0	—		47	1
Manchester United	2020–21	Premier League	29	1	3	0	2	0	11 (Note: Five appearances in UEFA Champions League, six appearances in UEFA Europa League)	0	—		45	1
Manchester United	2021–22	Premier League	28	0	1	0	1	0	5	0	—		35	0
Manchester United	2022–23	Premier League	20	0	4	0	4	0	7	0	—		35	0
Manchester United	2023–24	Premier League	19	1	3	0	2	0	4	0	—		28	1
Manchester United	2024–25	Premier League	16	0	1	0	2	0	6	0	0	0	25	0
Manchester United	Total		194	4	23	0	17	0	49	0	1	0	284	4
Aston Villa	2025–26	Premier League	17	0	1	0	0	0	10	0	—		28	0
Aston Villa	2026–27	Premier League	10	0	0	0	0	0	4	0	1	0	15	0
Aston Villa	Total		27	0	1	0	0	0	14	0	1	0	43	0
Career total			415	10	31	0	23	0	76	0	3	0	547	10

=== International ===
As of match played 17 November 2026

Appearances and goals by national team and year
National team	Year	Apps	Goals
Sweden
Sweden	2016	11	1
Sweden	2017	7	0
Sweden	2018	11	1
Sweden	2019	4	1
Sweden	2020	5	0
Sweden	2021	12	0
Sweden	2022	6	0
Sweden	2023	8	0
Sweden	2024	6	0
Sweden	2025	3	0
Sweden	2026	13	0
Total		86	3

As of match played 17 November 2026. Sweden score listed first, score column indicates score after each Lindelöf goal.

List of international goals scored by Victor Lindelöf
No.	Date	Venue	Opponent	Score	Result	Competition
1	10 October 2016	Friends Arena, Solna, Sweden	Bulgaria	3–0	3–0	2018 FIFA World Cup qualification
2	20 November 2018	Friends Arena, Solna, Sweden	Russia	1–0	2–0	2018–19 UEFA Nations League B
3	5 September 2019	Tórsvøllur, Tórshavn, Faroe Islands	Faroe Islands	3–0	4–0	UEFA Euro 2020 qualification

== Honours ==
Västerås SK

- Division 1 Norra: 2010

Benfica

- Primeira Liga: 2013–14, 2015–16, 2016–17
- Taça de Portugal: 2013–14, 2016–17
- Taça da Liga: 2015–16
- Supertaça Cândido de Oliveira: 2016

Manchester United

- FA Cup: 2023–24; runner-up: 2022–23
- EFL Cup: 2022–23
- UEFA Europa League runner-up: 2020–21, 2024–25

Aston Villa

- UEFA Europa League: 2025–26

Sweden U21

- UEFA European Under-21 Championship: 2015

Individual

- UEFA European Under-21 Championship Team of the Tournament: 2015
- Swedish Defender of the Year: 2016, 2019, 2020, 2021, 2022, 2023
- UEFA Champions League Breakthrough XI: 2016
- SJPF Primeira Liga Team of the Year: 2016
- Guldbollen: 2018, 2019
- BBC Team of the Week. Week 16, 2023.
