= 2015 UEFA European Under-21 Championship =

20th edition of the UEFA European Under-21 Championship

Mistrovství Evropy ve fotbale hráčů do 21 let 2015

Tournament details
- Host country: Czech Republic
- Dates: 17–30 June
- Teams: 8 (from 1 confederation)
- Venues: 4 (in 3 host cities)

Final positions
- Champions: Sweden (1st title)
- Runners-up: Portugal

Tournament statistics
- Matches played: 15
- Goals scored: 37 (2.47 per match)
- Attendance: 162,994 (10,866 per match)
- Top scorer: (Czech Republic) Jan Kliment (3 goals)
- Best player: (Portugal) William Carvalho

The 2015 UEFA European Under-21 Championship was the 20th edition of the UEFA European Under-21 Championship, a biennial international football competition for men's under-21 national teams organised by UEFA. The final tournament was hosted for the first time in the Czech Republic from 15 to 30 June 2015, after their bid was selected by the UEFA Executive Committee on 20 March 2012 in Istanbul.

Players born on or after 1 January 1992 were eligible to participate in the competition. Fifty-two teams participated in a qualification tournament, taking place between March 2013 and October 2014, to determine the seven teams that would join the final tournament hosts. Holders Spain were not able to defend their title after being eliminated in the qualification play-offs by Serbia.

In the final, played at the Eden Arena in Prague, Sweden defeated Portugal 4–3 in a penalty shootout, after a goalless draw at the end of extra-time. In doing so, the Swedish team won their first title in this competition, having previously lost the 1992 final, and secured their first-ever title in UEFA youth competitions on the men's side.

By reaching the semi-finals, Denmark, Germany, Portugal and Sweden also qualified for the 2016 Summer Olympics men's football tournament in Brazil.

== Qualification ==
Qualification for the final tournament of the 2015 UEFA European Under-21 Championship consisted of two rounds: a group stage and a play-off round. The group stage draw took place on 31 January 2013 in Nyon, Switzerland, and distributed 52 national teams into ten groups of five or six teams. Each group was contested in a double round-robin system, where teams played each other twice, at home and away. The ten group winners and the four best second-placed teams advanced to the play-off round, where they were paired by draw into seven two-legged ties. The play-off winners joined the Czech Republic in the final tournament.

=== Qualified teams ===
The following teams qualified for the 2015 UEFA European Under-21 Championship final tournament:

Country	Qualified as	Previous appearances in tournament^{1} only U-21 era (since 1978)
Czech Republic	Hosts	11 (1978^{5}, 1980^{5}, 1988^{5}, 1990^{5}, 1992^{5}, 1994^{5}, 1996, 2000, **2002**, 2007, 2011)
Denmark	Playoff winner (against Iceland)	5 (1978, 1986, 1992, 2006, 2011)
England	Playoff winner (against Croatia)	12 (1978, 1980, **1982**, **1984**, 1986, 1988, 2000, 2002, 2007, 2009, 2011, 2013)
Germany	Playoff winner (against Ukraine)	11 (1982^{2}, 1984^{2}, 1988^{2}, 1990^{2}, 1992, 1996, 1998, 2004, 2006, **2009**, 2013)
Italy	Playoff winner (against Slovakia)	17 (1978, 1980, 1982, 1984, 1986, 1988, 1990, **1992**, **1994**, **1996**, **2000**, 2002, **2004**, 2006, 2007, 2009, 2013)
Portugal	Playoff winner (against Netherlands)	6 (1994, 1996, 2002, 2004, 2006, 2007)
Serbia	Playoff winner (against Spain)	8 (**1978**^{3}, 1980^{3}, 1984^{3}, 1990^{3}, 2004^{4}, 2006^{4}, 2007, 2009)
Sweden	Playoff winner (against France)	6 (1986, 1990, 1992, 1998, 2004, 2009)

^{1} Bold indicates champion for that year. Italic indicates host for that year.
^{2} As West Germany
^{3} As Yugoslavia
^{4} As Serbia and Montenegro
^{5} As Czechoslovakia

== Venues ==
The competition was played at four venues in three host cities: Eden Arena and Generali Arena (in Prague), Andrův stadion (in Olomouc), and Stadion Miroslava Valenty (in Uherské Hradiště).

Prague		2015 UEFA European Under-21 Championship is located in Czech Republic	Olomouc	Uherské Hradiště
Eden Arena	Generali Arena	2015 UEFA European Under-21 Championship is located in Czech Republic	Andrův stadion	Stadion Miroslava Valenty
50°4′3″N 14°28′18″E	50°5′59.3″N 14°24′57.3″E	2015 UEFA European Under-21 Championship is located in Czech Republic	49°36′0″N 17°14′54″E	49°3′56″N 17°28′17.3″E
Capacity: 20,800	Capacity: 19,784	2015 UEFA European Under-21 Championship is located in Czech Republic	Capacity: 12,566	Capacity: 8,121

== Match officials ==
Six refereeing teams took charge of matches at the final tournament:

Country	Referee	Assistant referees	Additional assistant referees
France	Clément Turpin	Frédéric Cano; Nicolas Danos	Fredy Fautrel; Nicolas Rainville
Greece	Anastasios Sidiropoulos	Damianos Efthymiadis; Polychronis Kostaras	Michael Koukoulakis; Stavros Tritsonis
Netherlands	Danny Makkelie	Mario Diks; Hessel Steegstra	Kevin Blom; Jochem Kamphuis
Poland	Szymon Marciniak	Paweł Sokolnicki; Tomasz Listkiewicz	Paweł Raczkowski; Tomasz Musiał
Russia	Sergei Karasev	Anton Averyanov; Tikhon Kalugin	Sergey Lapochkin; Sergei Ivanov
Spain	Javier Estrada Fernández	Miguel Martínez Munuera; Teodoro Sobrino Magán	Alejandro Hernández Hernández; Jesús Gil Manzano

Country	Fourth officials
(Czech Republic) Czech Republic	Jan Paták; Ondrej Pelikan

== Seeding ==
The draw for the final tournament took place at 18:00 CET on 6 November 2014, at the Clarion Congress Hotel in Prague. England, the highest-ranked team according to the competition coefficient rankings, and the host team, Czech Republic, were seeded and automatically assigned to separate groups. The second and third-ranked teams in the coefficient rankings, Italy and Germany, were also seeded and drawn into separate groups, while the four unseeded teams were drawn into the remaining positions of the two groups.

Top seeds	Second seeds	Unseeded
Czech Republic (assigned to A1); England (assigned to B1)	Italy; Germany	Portugal; Denmark; Sweden; Serbia

== Squads ==
Each national team had to submit a squad of 23 players, three of whom had to be goalkeepers. If a player was injured or ill severely enough to prevent his participation in the tournament before his team's first match, he could be replaced by another player.

== Format of competitions ==
2015 UEFA European Under-21 Championship finalist teams

The eight finalists were drawn into two groups of four teams. As hosts, Czech Republic were seeded in group A, while England, the best-ranked team in the UEFA coefficient ranking, were seeded in group B. In each group, teams played matches against each other in a round-robin system, and the top two teams advanced to the semi-finals.

The provisional schedule was released by UEFA on 10 November 2014, and confirmed on 2 December 2014. All times are in Central European Summer Time (UTC+02:00).

After the conclusion of the group stage, the following four teams from UEFA qualified for the Olympic football tournament.

=== Tie-breaking ===
If two or more teams were equal on points on completion of the group matches, the following tie-breaking criteria were applied:

1. Higher number of points obtained in the matches played between the teams in question;
2. Superior goal difference resulting from the matches played between the teams in question;
3. Higher number of goals scored in the matches played between the teams in question;

If, after having applied criteria 1 to 3, teams still had an equal ranking, criteria 1 to 3 were reapplied exclusively to the matches between the teams in question to determine their final rankings. If this procedure did not lead to a decision, criteria 4 to 6 were applied.

4. Superior goal difference in all group matches;
5. Higher number of goals scored in all group matches;
6. Position in the UEFA under-21 coefficient ranking used for the final draw.

If only two teams were tied (according to criteria 1–5) after having met in the last match of the group stage, their ranking would have been determined by a penalty shoot-out.

=== Group A ===
Pos	Team	Pld	W	D	L	GF	GA	GD	Pts	Group stage result
1	Denmark	3	2	0	1	4	4	0	6	Advance to knockout stage and 2016 Summer Olympics
2	Germany	3	1	2	0	5	2	+3	5	Advance to knockout stage and 2016 Summer Olympics
3	Czech Republic (H)	3	1	1	1	6	3	+3	4	
4	Serbia	3	0	1	2	1	7	−6	1	

Source: UEFA
Rules for classification: tie-breaking
(H) Hosts
17 June 2015
18:00

Czech Republic	1–2	Denmark
Kadeřábek 35'	Report	Vestergaard 56'; Sisto 84'

Eden Arena, Prague
Attendance: 15,987
Referee: Szymon Marciniak (Poland)
17 June 2015
20:45

Germany	1–1	Serbia
Can 17'	Report	Đuričić 8'

Generali Arena, Prague
Attendance: 5,490
Referee: Javier Estrada Fernández (Spain)

20 June 2015
18:00

Serbia	0–4	Czech Republic
	Report	Kliment 7', 21', 56'; Frýdek 59'

Generali Arena, Prague
Attendance: 16,253
Referee: Clément Turpin (France)
20 June 2015
20:45

Germany	3–0	Denmark
Volland 32', 48'; Ginter 53'	Report

Eden Arena, Prague
Attendance: 13,268
Referee: Sergei Karasev (Russia)

23 June 2015
20:45

Czech Republic	1–1	Germany
Krejčí 66'	Report	Schulz 55'

Eden Arena, Prague
Attendance: 18,068
Referee: Danny Makkelie (Netherlands)
23 June 2015
20:45

Denmark	2–0	Serbia
Falk 21'; Fischer 47'	Report

Generali Arena, Prague
Attendance: 4,297
Referee: Anastasios Sidiropoulos (Greece)

=== Group B ===
Pos	Team	Pld	W	D	L	GF	GA	GD	Pts	Group stage result
1	Portugal	3	1	2	0	2	1	+1	5	Advance to knockout stage and 2016 Summer Olympics
2	Sweden	3	1	1	1	3	3	0	4	Advance to knockout stage and 2016 Summer Olympics
3	Italy	3	1	1	1	4	3	+1	4	
4	England	3	1	0	2	2	4	−2	3	

Source: UEFA
Rules for classification: tie-breaking
18 June 2015
18:00

Italy	1–2	Sweden
Berardi 29' (pen.)	Report	Guidetti 56'; Kiese Thelin 86' (pen.)

Andrův stadion, Olomouc
Attendance: 6,719
Referee: Anastasios Sidiropoulos (Greece)
18 June 2015
20:45

England	0–1	Portugal
	Report	João Mário 57'

Stadion Miroslava Valenty, Uherské Hradiště
Attendance: 7,167
Referee: Danny Makkelie (Netherlands)

21 June 2015
18:00

Sweden	0–1	England
	Report	Lingard 85'

Andrův stadion, Olomouc
Attendance: 11,257
Referee: Javier Estrada Fernández (Spain)
21 June 2015
20:45

Italy	0–0	Portugal
	Report

Stadion Miroslava Valenty, Uherské Hradiště
Attendance: 7,085
Referee: Szymon Marciniak (Poland)

24 June 2015
20:45

England	1–3	Italy
Redmond 90+3'	Report	Belotti 25'; Benassi 27', 72'

Andrův stadion, Olomouc
Attendance: 11,563
Referee: Sergei Karasev (Russia)
24 June 2015
20:45

Portugal	1–1	Sweden
Paciência 82'	Report	Tibbling 89'

Stadion Miroslava Valenty, Uherské Hradiště
Attendance: 7,263
Referee: Clément Turpin (France)

== Knockout stage ==
In the knockout stage, extra time and penalty shoot-out were used to decide the winner if necessary.

=== Bracket ===
Semi-finals
27 June – Prague
Denmark	1
Sweden	4
27 June – Olomouc
Portugal	5
Germany	0

Final
30 June – Prague
Sweden (p)	0 (4)
Portugal	0 (3)

=== Semi-finals ===
27 June 2015
18:00

Portugal	5–0	Germany
B. Silva 25'; Ricardo 33'; Cavaleiro 45+1'; João Mário 46'; Horta 71'	Report

Andrův stadion, Olomouc
Attendance: 9,876
Referee: Anastasios Sidiropoulos (Greece)

27 June 2015
21:00

Denmark	1–4	Sweden
Bech 63'	Report	Guidetti 23' (pen.); Tibbling 26'; Quaison 83'; Hiljemark 90+5'

Generali Arena, Prague
Attendance: 9,834
Referee: Sergei Karasev (Russia)

=== Final ===
30 June 2015
20:45

Sweden	0–0 (a.e.t.)	Portugal
	Report
Penalties
Guidetti (penalty scored); Kiese Thelin (penalty scored); Augustinsson (penalty scored); Khalili (penalty missed); Lindelöf (penalty scored)	4–3	(penalty scored) Paciência; (penalty scored) Tozé; (penalty missed) Esgaio; (penalty scored) João Mário; (penalty missed) Carvalho

Eden Arena, Prague
Attendance: 18,867
Referee: Szymon Marciniak (Poland)

== Goalscorers ==
3 goals

- (Czech Republic) Jan Kliment

2 goals

- (Germany) Kevin Volland
- (Italy) Marco Benassi
- (Portugal) João Mário
- (Sweden) John Guidetti
- (Sweden) Simon Tibbling

1 goal

- (Czech Republic) Martin Frýdek
- (Czech Republic) Pavel Kadeřábek
- (Czech Republic) Ladislav Krejčí
- (Denmark) Uffe Bech
- (Denmark) Rasmus Falk
- (Denmark) Viktor Fischer
- (Denmark) Pione Sisto
- (Denmark) Jannik Vestergaard
- (England) Jesse Lingard
- (England) Nathan Redmond
- (Germany) Emre Can
- (Germany) Matthias Ginter
- (Germany) Nico Schulz
- (Italy) Andrea Belotti
- (Italy) Domenico Berardi
- (Portugal) Ivan Cavaleiro
- (Portugal) Ricardo Horta
- (Portugal) Gonçalo Paciência
- (Portugal) Ricardo
- (Portugal) Bernardo Silva
- (Serbia) Filip Đuričić
- (Sweden) Oscar Hiljemark
- (Sweden) Isaac Kiese Thelin
- (Sweden) Robin Quaison

Source: UEFA.com

== Awards ==
=== Golden Boot ===
The Golden Boot is given to the player who scored the most goals during the tournament.

Golden Boot	Silver Boot	Bronze Boot
(Czech Republic) Jan Kliment (3 goals)	(Germany) Kevin Volland (2 goals, 1 assist)	(Sweden) John Guidetti (2 goals, 1 assist)

Note: Assists and then minutes played (with the player boasting the better goals to minutes on the pitch ratio taking precedence) are used to separate players with the same goal tallies.

=== Player of the tournament ===
After the tournament the U21 EURO Player of the Tournament is selected by the UEFA Technical Observers.

Player of the tournament
(Portugal) William Carvalho

=== Team of the tournament ===
After the tournament the Under-21 Team of the Tournament is selected by the UEFA Technical Observers.

Position	Player
Goalkeeper	(Portugal) José Sá
Defenders	(Sweden) Victor Lindelöf
Defenders	(Sweden) Filip Helander
Defenders	(Denmark) Jannik Vestergaard
Defenders	(Portugal) Raphaël Guerreiro
Midfielders	(Portugal) William Carvalho
Midfielders	(Sweden) Oscar Lewicki
Midfielders	(England) Nathan Redmond
Midfielders	(Portugal) Bernardo Silva
Midfielders	(Portugal) Ivan Cavaleiro
Forward	(Germany) Kevin Volland

=== Medal table ===
Pos	Team	Pld	W	D	L	GF	GA	GD	Pts	Final result
1st place, gold medalist(s)	Sweden	5	2	2	1	7	4	+3	8	Gold Medal
2nd place, silver medalist(s)	Portugal	5	2	3	0	7	1	+6	9	Silver Medal
3rd place, bronze medalist(s)	Denmark	4	2	0	2	5	8	−3	6	Eliminated in semi-finals
3rd place, bronze medalist(s)	Germany	4	1	2	1	5	7	−2	5	Eliminated in semi-finals
5	Czech Republic (H)	3	1	1	1	6	3	+3	4	Eliminated in group stage
6	Italy	3	1	1	1	4	3	+1	4	Eliminated in group stage
7	England	3	1	0	2	2	4	−2	3	Eliminated in group stage
8	Serbia	3	0	1	2	1	7	−6	1	Eliminated in group stage

Source: [ ]
(H) Hosts

== Qualification for the 2016 Summer Olympics ==
Same as previous Under-21 Championships that were held one year prior to the Olympics, UEFA used the tournament to determine which men's under-23 national teams from Europe qualify for the Olympic football tournament. The four teams which advanced to the semi-finals qualified for the 2016 Summer Olympics in Brazil. However, England are ineligible for the Olympics and they are not an Olympic nation. Had England reached the semi-finals, the last Olympic spot would go to the winner of an Olympic play-off match between the two group third-placed teams, which was scheduled to be played on 28 June 2015, 18:00, at Stadion Miroslava Valenty, Uherské Hradiště. However, when England failed to advance out of the group stage, this was cancelled. (Note: The Football Association had originally declared on 2 March 2015 its intention to enter and run teams on behalf of the British Olympic Association at the 2016 Olympics should England qualify. However, following objections from the Scottish, Welsh and Northern Irish football associations, as well as a commitment from FIFA that they would not allow entry of a British team unless all four Home Nations were in agreement, the Football Association announced on 30 March 2015 that they would not seek entry into the Olympic tournament. Great Britain had competed in the Olympics prior to the 1970s, and also in 2012 as the host nation.)

Team	Qualified on	Previous appearances in tournament^{1}
Denmark	23 June 2015	8 (1908, 1912, 1920, 1948, 1952, 1960, 1972, 1992)
Germany	23 June 2015	8 (1912, 1928, 1936, 1952, 1956^{2}, 1972^{2}, 1984^{2}, 1988^{2})
Portugal	24 June 2015	3 (1928, 1996, 2004)
Sweden	24 June 2015	9 (1908, 1912, 1920, 1924, 1936, **1948**, 1952, 1988, 1992)

^{1} Bold indicates champion for that year. Italic indicates host for that year. Statistics include all Olympic format (current Olympic under-23 format started in 1992).
^{2} The team represented the United Team of Germany in 1956, and the Federal Republic of Germany (i.e., West Germany) in 1972, 1984 and 1988.

== Broadcasting ==
Countries who are not covered by a local broadcaster had the matches broadcast on YouTube.

UEFA countries
Territory	Rights holder	Ref
Belgium	Ma Chaîne Sport	
Bosnia and Herzegovina	Arena Sport	
Bulgaria	Viasat	
Croatia	Arena Sport	
Czech Republic	ČT	
Denmark	DR, Viasat	
Estonia	Viasat	
Finland	Elisa	
France	Ma Chaîne Sport	
Germany	ARD, ZDF, Sport1	
Israel	Charlton	
Italy	RAI	
Latvia	Viasat	
Lithuania	Viasat	
Luxembourg	Ma Chaîne Sport	
Macedonia	Arena Sport	
Montenegro	Arena Sport	
Norway	Viasat	
Portugal	RTP, SportTV	
Romania	Dolce Sport	
Serbia	Arena Sport	
Slovakia	TV JOJ	
Sweden	TV4, TV12	
Switzerland	Ma Chaîne Sport	
United Kingdom	BT Sport	

Rest of the world
Territory	Rights holder	Ref
Australia	beIN Sports	
Brazil	SporTV	
Canada	TSN, RDS	
Caribbean	ESPN	
China	CCTV	
Indonesia	MNC Media	
Japan	WOWOW	
Latin America	ESPN	
Malaysia	Astro	
Sub-Saharan Africa	Ma Chaîne Sport	
Thailand	PPTV	
United States	ESPN	

== Ambassador ==
Former Czech Republic midfielder Pavel Nedvěd was the ambassador for the tournament.
