= Oscar Hiljemark =

Swedish footballer (born 1992)

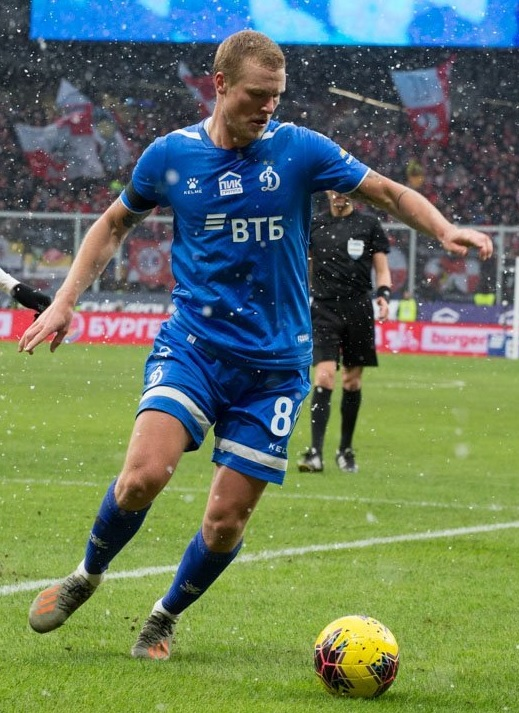
- Hiljemark with Dynamo Moscow in 2020

Personal information
- Full name: Oscar Karl Niclas Hiljemark
- Date of birth: 28 June 1992 (age 34)
- Place of birth: Gislaved, Sweden
- Height: 1.85 m (6 ft 1 in)
- Position: Midfielder

Youth career
- –2008: Gislaveds IS
- 2008–2010: IF Elfsborg

Senior career*
Years	Team	Apps	(Gls)
2010–2012	IF Elfsborg	61	(5)
2013–2015	PSV	49	(2)
2015	→ Jong PSV	3	(0)
2015–2017	Palermo	53	(4)
2016–2017	→ Genoa (loan)	14	(2)
2017–2020	Genoa	32	(1)
2017–2018	→ Panathinaikos (loan)	16	(2)
2019–2020	→ Dynamo Moscow (loan)	14	(0)
2020–2021	AaB	11	(1)
Total		253	(17)

International career
2009	Sweden U17	3	(1)
2009–2010	Sweden U19	10	(2)
2011–2015	Sweden U21	37	(4)
2012–2020	Sweden	28	(2)

Managerial career
- 2022: AaB (caretaker)
- 2023–2024: AaB
- 2024–2026: IF Elfsborg
- 2026: Pisa
Medal record
Men's football
Representing Sweden
UEFA European Under-21 Championship
Winner	2015 Czech Republic
- * Club domestic league appearances and goals

Oscar Karl Niclas Hiljemark (Swedish pronunciation: [ˈhɪ̂lːjɛˌmark]; born 28 June 1992) is a Swedish professional football coach and a former player who was most recently the head coach of Italian club Pisa. A midfielder, he started his career with IF Elfsborg in 2010 and went on to represent PSV, Palermo, Genoa, Panathinaikos, and Dynamo Moscow before retiring at AaB in 2021. A full international between 2012 and 2020, he won 28 caps for the Sweden national team and represented his country at UEFA Euro 2016 and the 2018 FIFA World Cup.

== Club career ==
=== Early career ===
Hiljemark played for Swedish top team IF Elfsborg. He was chased by many clubs in Sweden in his youth, but decided to sign a youth contract with Elfsborg in 2008. He participated in many national team camps as a young player and was expected to have a great career due to his mature style of play.

=== IF Elfsborg ===
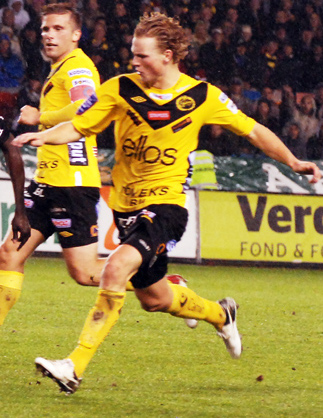
Hiljemark with Elfsborg in 2012

Two years after signing with Elfsborg at the age of 18, he earned a place in the senior team after playing for Elfsborg and the Sweden national youth teams. During his first year in the Elfsborg senior team, he played four games in the Allsvenskan and two in the Europa League qualifiers. He played 30 minutes in the Europa League play-off match against Napoli. The game ended with a 2–0 loss for Elfsborg after two goals from Edinson Cavani.

He made his first team debut in Elfsborg's 2–2 draw away at IF Brommapojkarna on 26 September 2010, and scored his first goal against Syrianska in a 2–1 home victory on 27 June 2011.

At the age of 18, in his debut season of 2011, he was nominated for newcomer of the year, the youngest nominee. He also won the prestigious Månadens Tipselitspelare prize with the jury's citation: "Oscar Hiljemark has been endowed with a massive winning attitude that he has used to the competitive environment for the optimum development. He is a talented player who works hard and takes a mature responsibility from his midfield position." Players who also won the prize are Freddie Ljungberg, Johan Elmander, Olof Mellberg and Kim Källström.

After a successful 2011 season, Hiljemark was scouted and chased by clubs such as Genoa and Club Brugge, but Elfsborg ignored the bids, as they want him for a few more seasons.

=== PSV Eindhoven ===
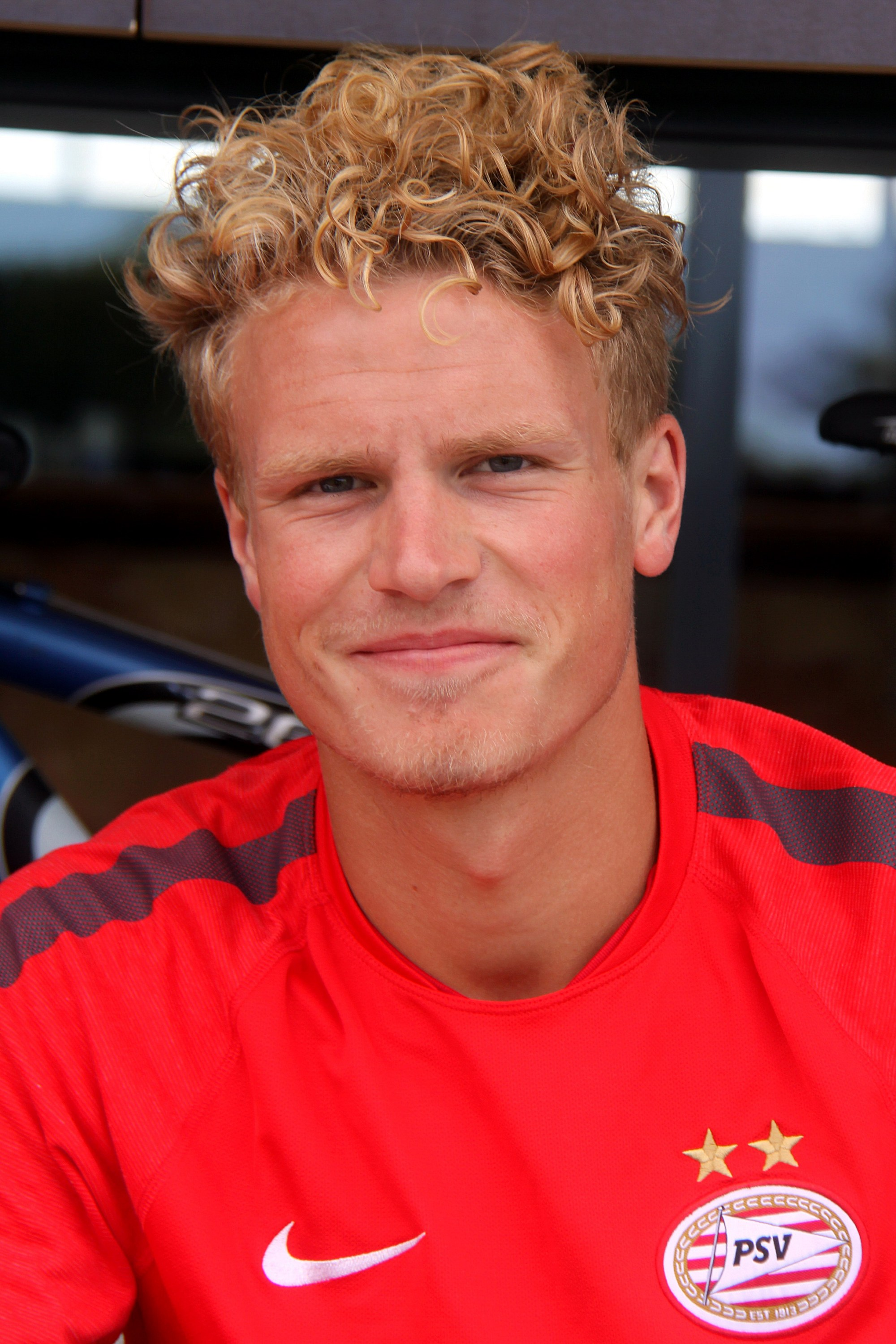
Hiljemark with PSV in 2013

On 4 January 2013, Hiljemark signed with PSV until 2017, for €2.2 million. He made his Eredivisie debut on 26 January 2013 in a 5–1 away victory against Heracles Almelo, replacing Tim Matavž. He scored his first goal on 17 August 2013 in a convincing 3–0 victory against Go Ahead Eagles. With the likes of Memphis Depay and Georginio Wijnaldum in the midfield, however, Hiljemark struggled to find consistent minutes. Injuries also prevented him from establishing any sort of rhythm. Despite 49 league appearances for PSV, mostly as a late substitute, Hiljemark managed just two league goals in two years for his club.

=== Palermo ===
After winning the 2015 U21 European Championship, several teams were interested in the Swedish midfielder. He moved to Italian team Palermo for €2 million (plus €500,000 in add-ons), signing a four-year contract. In Rosanero, he joined U21 teammate Robin Quaison. He recorded his first Serie A goal on 13 September 2015 against Carpi, a game that ended in a 2–2 draw. Six days later, he scored a brace against Milan, tying the game twice before a 2–3 loss. Hiljemark's brilliant start to the season attracted the attention of bigger clubs. He was linked with Italian giants Milan and Napoli for a possible transfer, as well as Premier League teams Norwich City, Southampton, Watford and West Ham. Towards the end of the 2015–16 Serie A season, Palermo looked to be in danger of being relegated. In the last game of the season, Hiljemark provided a crucial assist for Franco Vázquez in a 3–2 victory against Verona to clinch a spot for Palermo in the 2016–17 Serie A season. Hiljemark played in all 38 matches of Palermo in that season.

=== Genoa ===
On 26 January 2017, Palermo officially announced that Oscar Hiljemark had joined Genoa, on loan with an obligation to buy. The Grifone have been trying to reinforce their midfield, and it emerged that they were close to the Swedish midfielder.

==== Loan to Panathinaikos ====
On 31 August 2017, Genoa midfielder Oscar Hiljemark arrived in Athens to complete his loan move to Panathinaikos, with the latter retaining the option to purchase the player at the end of the 2017–18 season. On 30 September 2017, he scored his first goal with the club in a 2–0 home Super League win game against PAS Giannina.

On 30 January 2018, Hiljemark's loan spell with Genoa was terminated by mutual consent, mainly due to the player's unwillingness to continue amid the club's financial difficulties and funding interruptions.

==== Loan to Dynamo Moscow ====
On 1 September 2019, Hiljemark joined Russian club Dynamo Moscow on loan for the 2019–20 season.

=== AaB and retirement ===
On 5 October 2020, Hiljemark signed a deal until June 2023 with Danish Superliga club AaB. On 16 June 2021, at the age of only 28, he announced his retirement after prolonged problems with injuries, particularly a recurring hip injury. AaB announced that Hiljemark will work as an assistant coach on a contract until 30 June 2024.

== International career ==
=== Youth ===
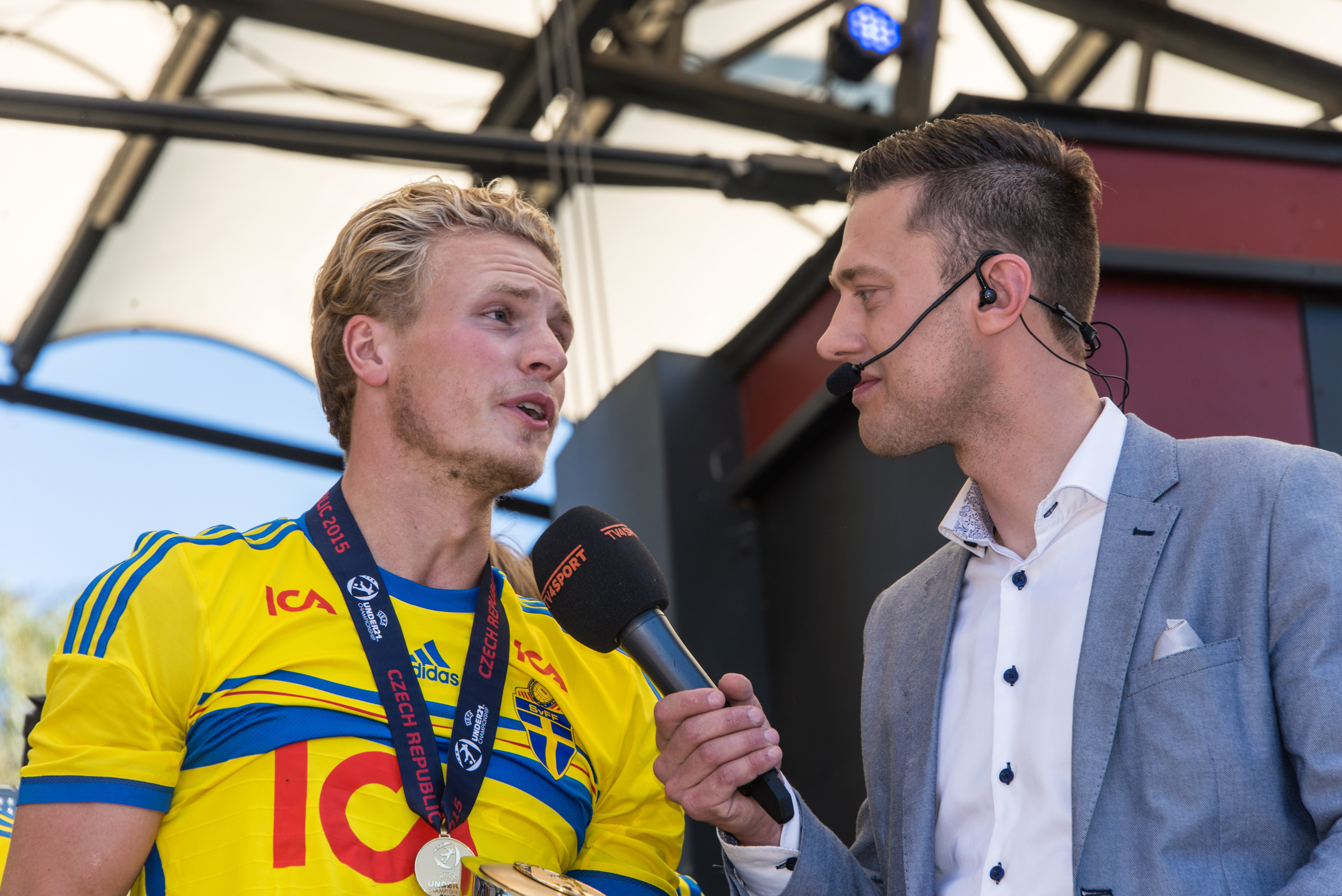
Hiljemark interviewed after winning the 2015 U21 European Championship

Hiljemark made his debut for Sweden U21 on 9 February 2011 in a 1–3 defeat against Portugal. He captained the U21s throughout their successful 2015 U21 European Championship campaign, in the Czech Republic.

=== Senior ===
Hiljemark was selected for the Sweden national team's annual training camp in January 2012. He made his debut for Sweden in a friendly against Bahrain on 18 January 2012, scoring his first goal for his country. Due to his involvement with the U-21 squad, Hiljemark was not regularly selected for the senior team until after the 2015 U21 European Championship. He received his first big call-up to the senior side in November 2015 against Denmark for the UEFA Euro 2016 qualifying play-offs. He came on in the 81st minute of the second leg for Sebastian Larsson. Hiljemark was then announced to be one of the 23 players called up for the Euro 2016 campaign.

In May 2018 he was named in Sweden's 23-man squad for the 2018 FIFA World Cup in Russia, and played in the group stage games against South Korea and Mexico.

== Coaching career ==
After retiring at the age of 28, Hiljemark embarked on a career as a coach, becoming the assistant of Danish football club AaB in 2021, being promoted to head coach in 2023.

In 2024, he took over at Allsvenskan club IF Elfsborg.

On 3 February 2026, Hiljemark was announced as the new head coach of Serie A club Pisa.

On 8 June 2026, Hiljemark was sacked following Pisa's relegation to Serie B.

== Career statistics ==
=== Club ===
Appearances and goals by club, season and competition
Club	Season	League			Cup		Europe		Other		Total	
Club	Season	Division	Apps	Goals	Apps	Goals	Apps	Goals	Apps	Goals	Apps	Goals
Elfsborg	2010	Allsvenskan	4	0	–		–		–		4	0
Elfsborg	2011	Allsvenskan	29	3	3	0	5	1	–		37	4
Elfsborg	2012	Allsvenskan	28	2	1	1	5	1	–		34	4
Elfsborg	Total		61	5	4	1	10	2	0	0	75	8
PSV	2012–13	Eredivisie	11	0	2	0	–		–		13	0
PSV	2013–14	Eredivisie	27	2	2	0	7	0	–		36	2
PSV	2014–15	Eredivisie	11	0	0	0	5	0	–		16	0
PSV	Total		49	2	4	0	12	0	0	0	65	2
Palermo	2015–16	Serie A	38	4	1	0	–		–		39	4
Palermo	2016–17	Serie A	15	0	1	0	–		–		16	0
Palermo	Total		53	4	2	0	0	0	0	0	55	4
Genoa (loan)	2016–17	Serie A	14	2	0	0	–		–		14	2
Genoa	2017–18	Serie A	15	0	0	0	–		–		15	0
Genoa	2018–19	Serie A	17	1	1	0	–		–		18	1
Genoa	2019–20	Serie A	0	0	0	0	–		–		0	0
Genoa	Total		46	3	1	0	0	0	0	0	47	3
Panathinaikos (loan)	2017–18	Super League Greece	16	2	3	1	–		–		19	3
Dynamo Moscow (loan)	2019–20	Russian Premier League	14	0	1	0	–		–		15	0
AaB	2020–21	Danish Superliga	11	1	–		–		–		11	1
Career total			250	17	15	1	22	2	0	0	287	20

=== International ===
Appearances and goals by national team and year
National team	Year	Apps	Goals
Sweden	2012	2	1
Sweden	2013	1	0
Sweden	2014	3	0
Sweden	2015	1	0
Sweden	2016	8	1
Sweden	2017	3	0
Sweden	2018	9	0
Sweden	2019	0	0
Sweden	2020	1	0
Total		28	2

Scores and results list Sweden's goal tally first, score column indicates score after each Hiljemark goal.

List of international goals scored by Oscar Hiljemark
No.	Date	Venue	Opponent	Score	Result	Competition
1	18 January 2012	Thani bin Jassim Stadium, Al Rayyan, Qatar	Bahrain	2–0	2–0	Friendly
2	10 October 2016	Friends Arena, Solna, Sweden	Bulgaria	2–0	3–0	2018 FIFA World Cup qualification

== Managerial statistics ==
As of match played 23 May 2026

Managerial record by team and tenure
Team	Nat.	From	To	Record				
Team	Nat.	From	To	M	W	D	L	Win %
AaB	(Denmark)	21 March 2023	2 June 2024	43	22	12	9	51.16
Elfsborg	(Sweden)	3 June 2024	2 February 2026	69	34	12	23	49.28
Pisa	(Italy)	3 February 2026	8 June 2026	15	1	1	13	6.67
Career Total				127	55	26	46	43.31

== Honours ==
Elfsborg

- Allsvenskan: 2012

PSV

- Eredivisie: 2014–15

Sweden U21

- UEFA European Under-21 Championship: 2015

Records

- Most caps for the Swedish Under-21 team: 37
