= 2023–24 UD Almería season =

UD Almería
2023–24 season
- President: Turki Al-Sheikh
- Head coach: Vicente Moreno (until 29 September); Alberto Lasarte (caretaker, from 29 September to 8 October); Gaizka Garitano (from 8 October to 13 March); Pepe Mel (from 13 March)
- Stadium: Power Horse Stadium
- La Liga: 19th (relegated)
- Copa del Rey: Second round
- Top goalscorer: League: Sergio Arribas (9); All: Sergio Arribas (9)
- Highest home attendance: 17,561 vs Real Madrid
- Lowest home attendance: 7,558 vs Cádiz
- Average home league attendance: 12,893
- Biggest win: Almería 6–1 Cádiz
- Biggest defeat: Sevilla 5–1 Almería
Home colours	Away colours	Third colours

The 2023–24 season was Unión Deportiva Almería's 35th season in existence and second consecutive season in La Liga, the top flight of association football in Spain. They also competed in the Copa del Rey.

On 3 February 2024, Almeria lost 2–1 to Valencia, thus reaching 23 matches from the start of the season without a win, putting them in dubious company alongside the infamous 1997–98 Sporting Gijón team, the only other side in La Liga history to fail to win any of their opening 23 matches. Almería then overtook Sporting Gijón's record following a 0–0 draw at home to Athletic Bilbao in their following match. On 18 February, Almería drew 1–1 away at Granada, breaking Levante's previous record of 28 consecutive matches without a win in La Liga. On 27 April, the club was formally relegated to the second division following a 1–3 home defeat against Getafe.

== Players ==
=== First-team squad ===
As of 5 February 2024.

Note: Flags indicate national team as defined under FIFA eligibility rules; some limited exceptions apply. Players may hold more than one non-FIFA nationality.

No.	Pos.	Nation	Player
1	GK	ESP	Diego Mariño
3	DF	ESP	Edgar González
4	MF	GHA	Iddrisu Baba (on loan from Mallorca)
5	MF	ARG	Lucas Robertone
6	MF	SEN	Dion Lopy
7	MF	BEL	Largie Ramazani
8	MF	ESP	Jonathan Viera
9	FW	COL	Luis Suárez
10	MF	ESP	Adrián Embarba
11	MF	ESP	Gonzalo Melero
12	FW	BRA	Léo Baptistão
13	GK	ESP	Fernando Martínez
15	FW	HON	Choco Lozano (on loan from Getafe)

No.	Pos.	Nation	Player
16	DF	SRB	Aleksandar Radovanović
17	DF	ESP	Alejandro Pozo
18	DF	ESP	Marc Pubill
19	MF	ESP	Sergio Arribas
20	DF	ESP	Álex Centelles
21	DF	ESP	Chumi
22	DF	MEX	César Montes
23	FW	MLI	Ibrahima Koné
24	DF	MOZ	Bruno Langa (on loan from Chaves)
25	GK	POR	Luís Maximiano (on loan from Lazio)
29	FW	SRB	Marko Milovanović
38	FW	ARG	Luka Romero (on loan from AC Milan)

=== Reserve team ===
Note: Flags indicate national team as defined under FIFA eligibility rules; some limited exceptions apply. Players may hold more than one non-FIFA nationality.

No.	Pos.	Nation	Player
26	MF	ESP	Marcos Peña
27	DF	ESP	Paco Sanz
29	FW	MAR	Rachad Fettal

No.	Pos.	Nation	Player
30	DF	ESP	Carlos Ballestero
32	DF	ESP	Miguel Peña
37	GK	ESP	Bruno Iribarne

=== Out on loan ===
Note: Flags indicate national team as defined under FIFA eligibility rules; some limited exceptions apply. Players may hold more than one non-FIFA nationality.

No.	Pos.	Nation	Player
—	DF	ESP	Arnau Solà (at Cartagena until 30 June 2024)
—	DF	BRA	Kaiky (at Albacete until 30 June 2024)
—	DF	GBS	Houboulang Mendes (at Mirandés until 30 June 2024)
—	MF	POR	Gui Guedes (at Porto B until 30 June 2024)
—	MF	SVK	Martin Šviderský (at Murcia until 30 June 2024)

No.	Pos.	Nation	Player
—	MF	ESP	Arnau Puigmal (at Elche until 30 June 2024)
—	MF	BRA	Lázaro (at Palmeiras until 30 June 2024)
—	FW	ENG	Arvin Appiah (at Rotherham United until 30 June 2024)
—	FW	ESP	Carlos Rojas (at Murcia until 30 June 2024)
—	FW	GBS	Marciano Sanca (at Alcorcón until 30 June 2024)

== Transfers ==
=== In ===
Pos.	Player	Transferred from	Fee	Date	Source
FW	(Colombia) Luis Suárez	(France) Marseille	€8,000,000	1 July 2023	
DF	(Spain) Edgar González	(Spain) Real Betis	€4,500,000	6 July 2023	
FW	(Mali) Ibrahima Koné	(France) Lorient	€7,500,000	16 August 2023	
GK	(Portugal) Luís Maximiano	(Italy) Lazio	Loan	16 August 2023	
DF	(Mexico) César Montes	(Spain) Espanyol	€14,000,000	1 September 2023	
DF	(Serbia) Aleksandar Radovanović	(Belgium) Kortrijk	Free	20 January 2024	
MF	(Argentina) Luka Romero	(Italy) AC Milan	Loan	22 January 2024	
FW	(Honduras) Anthony Lozano	(Spain) Getafe	Loan	1 February 2024	
DF	(Mozambique) Bruno Langa	(Portugal) Chaves	Loan	1 February 2024	
MF	(Spain) Jonathan Viera	Unattached	Free	6 February 2024	

=== Out ===
Pos.	Player	Transferred to	Fee	Date	Source
MF	(Spain) César de la Hoz	Released		1 July 2023	
MF	(Spain) Francisco Portillo	Released		1 July 2023	
DF	(Serbia) Nikola Maraš	(Spain) Alavés	€1,500,000	1 July 2023	
DF	(Serbia) Srđan Babić	(Russia) Spartak Moscow	€5,000,000	21 August 2023	
MF	(Portugal) Gui Guedes	(Portugal) Porto B	Loan	1 September 2023	
DF	(Spain) Sergio Akieme	(France) Reims	€6,000,000	1 February 2024	
DF	(Guinea-Bissau) Houboulang Mendes	(Spain) Mirandés	Loan	1 February 2024	
DF	(Brazil) Kaiky	(Spain) Albacete	Loan	1 February 2024	
FW	(Brazil) Lázaro	(Brazil) Palmeiras	Loan	7 February 2024	

== Pre-season and friendlies ==
Win Draw Loss

18 July 2023 Friendly	El Ejido	0–7	Almería	El Ejido
20:30 CEST (UTC+2)		Report	Suárez 20', 37'; Ramazani 39'; Lázaro 41'; Marciano 48', 54'; Embarba 75'	Stadium: Estadio Municipal Santo Domingo; Referee: José Antonio Villalobos

23 July 2023 Friendly	Almería	0–0	Las Palmas	San Pedro de Alcántara
18:00 CEST (UTC+2)		Report		Stadium: Marbella Football Center; Referee: Pablo Morales Moreno

27 July 2023 Friendly	Almería	0–1	Málaga	San Pedro de Alcántara
19:30 CEST (UTC+2)	Chumi (yellow card) 25'; Costa (yellow card) 71'	Report	Cristian 18'	Stadium: Marbella Football Center; Referee: Juan Antonio Manrique

31 July 2023 Friendly	Almería	1–1	Antequera	Marbella
09:30 CEST (UTC+2)	Suárez 14'	Report	Topo 82'	Stadium: Marbella Football Center; Referee: Luis Mario Milla

5 August 2023 Friendly	Almería	1–0	Granada	Almería
20:00 CEST (UTC+2)	Suárez 44' (pen.)		Gumbau (red card) 73'	Stadium: Power Horse Stadium; Attendance: 7,810; Referee: Sánchez Martínez

== Competitions ==
=== Overall record ===
Competition	First match	Last match	Starting round	Final position	Record							
Competition	First match	Last match	Starting round	Final position	Pld	W	D	L	GF	GA	GD	Win %
La Liga	11 August 2023	25 May 2024	Matchday 1	19th	38	3	12	23	43	75	−32	7.89
Copa del Rey	31 October 2023	6 December 2023	First round	Second round	2	1	0	1	2	1	+1	50.00
Total					40	4	12	24	45	76	−31	10.00

Source: Soccerway

=== La Liga ===
==== League table ====
Pos	Team	Pld	W	D	L	GF	GA	GD	Pts	Qualification or relegation
16	Las Palmas	38	10	10	18	33	47	−14	40 (Note: Mallorca finished ahead of Las Palmas on head-to-head points: Las Palmas 1–1 Mallorca, Mallorca 1–0 Las Palmas.)	
17	Rayo Vallecano	38	8	14	16	29	48	−19	38	
18	Cádiz (R)	38	6	15	17	26	55	−29	33	Relegation to Segunda División
19	Almería (R)	38	3	12	23	43	75	−32	21 (Note: Tied on head-to-head points. Almería finished ahead of Granada on overall goal difference.)	Relegation to Segunda División
20	Granada (R)	38	4	9	25	38	79	−41	21	Relegation to Segunda División

Source: LaLiga EA Sports
Rules for classification: 1) Points; 2) Head-to-head points; 3) Head-to-head goal difference; 4) Goal difference; 5) Goals scored; 6) Fair-play points
(Note: Head-to-head record is used only after all the matches between the teams in question have been played)
(R) Relegation

==== Results summary ====
Overall								Home						Away					
Pld	W	D	L	GF	GA	GD	Pts	W	D	L	GF	GA	GD	W	D	L	GF	GA	GD
38	3	12	23	43	75	−32	21	1	8	10	22	36	−14	2	4	13	21	39	−18

Source: La Liga

==== Results by round ====
Round	1	2	3	4	5	6	7	8	9	10	11	12	13	14	15	16	17	18	19	20	21	22	23	24	25	26	27	28	29	30	31	32	33	34	35	36	37	38
Ground	H	H	A	H	A	H	A	H	A	A	H	A	H	A	H	A	H	A	A	H	A	H	A	H	A	H	A	H	A	H	A	H	H	A	A	H	A	H
Result	L	L	D	L	L	D	L	D	L	L	L	L	L	L	D	L	D	L	L	D	L	L	L	D	D	D	L	D	W	L	D	L	L	W	L	L	D	W
Position	18	19	19	19	20	20	20	20	20	20	20	20	20	20	20	20	20	20	20	20	20	20	20	20	20	20	20	20	20	20	20	20	20	20	20	20	20	19

Source: La Liga
A = Away; H = Home; W = Win; D = Draw; L = Loss

==== Matches ====
The league fixtures were unveiled on 22 June 2023.

11 August 2023 1	Almería	0–2	Rayo Vallecano	Almería
19:30 CEST (UTC+2)	Ramazani (yellow card) 65'	Report	Palazón 20' (pen.); Nteka 28' (pen.); López (yellow card) 40'; García (yellow card) 40'; Valentín (yellow card) 65'	Stadium: Power Horse Stadium; Attendance: 14,837; Referee: Javier Alberola Rojas

19 August 2023 2	Almería	1–3	Real Madrid	Almería
19:30 CEST (UTC+2)	Arribas 3'; Chumi (yellow card) 59'	Report	Bellingham 19', 60'; Vinícius 73'	Stadium: Power Horse Stadium; Attendance: 17,561; Referee: José María Sánchez Martínez

26 August 2023 3	Cádiz	1–1	Almería	Cádiz
19:00 CEST (UTC+2)	L. Hernández 59'; San Emeterio (red card) 90+10'	Report	Puigmal (yellow card) 9'; González (yellow card) 27' (yellow-red card) 50'; Suárez (yellow card) 72'; Ramazani (yellow card) 90'; Kaiky 90+5'	Stadium: Nuevo Mirandilla; Attendance: 18,653; Referee: Víctor García Verdura

1 September 2023 4	Almería	2–3	Celta Vigo	Almería
22:00 CEST (UTC+2)	Pubill (yellow card) 28'; Akieme 54'; Arribas 68'	Report	Núñez 24'; Larsen 33'; Sánchez (yellow card) 55'; Swedberg 87'	Stadium: Power Horse Stadium; Attendance: 14,196; Referee: Ricardo de Burgos Bengoetxea

17 September 2023 5	Villarreal	2–1	Almería	Villarreal
16:15 CEST (UTC+2)	Capoue (yellow card) 26'; Gerard 45+5'; Pino (yellow card) 90+2'; Sørloth 90+4'	Report	Akieme 44'; Embarba (yellow card) 53'; Chumi (yellow card) 84'; Puigmal (yellow card) 89'	Stadium: Estadio de la Cerámica; Attendance: 18,467; Referee: Francisco José Hernández Maeso

23 September 2023 6	Almería	2–2	Valencia	Almería
21:00 CEST (UTC+2)	Arribas 59', 69'; Montes (yellow card) 60'; Melero (yellow card) 83'; Ramazani (yellow card) 89'; Baptistão (yellow card) 90+11'	Report	López 14'; Pérez (yellow card) 51'; Guerra 63'; Diakhaby (yellow card) 86'	Stadium: Power Horse Stadium; Attendance: 14,266; Referee: Mateo Busquets Ferrer

26 September 2023 7	Sevilla	5–1	Almería	Seville
19:00 CEST (UTC+2)	En-Nesyri 7'; Lukebakio 8'; Suso 38', (yellow card) 84'; Lamela 51', (yellow card) 90+1'; Navas (yellow card) 70'; Salas 90+2'	Report	Suárez 71' (pen.); Kaiky (yellow card) 77'; Baba (yellow card) 86'	Stadium: Ramón Sánchez Pizjuán; Attendance: 35,729; Referee: Guillermo Cuadra Fernández

1 October 2023 8	Almería	3–3	Granada	Almería
14:00 CEST (UTC+2)	Suárez 21', 44', 45+1'; Puigmal (yellow card) 65'; Akieme (yellow card) 82'	Report	Puertas (penalty missed) 56'; Zaragoza 66'; Sánchez 70'; Uzuni 86'; Villar (yellow card) 88'	Stadium: Power Horse Stadium; Attendance: 14,264; Referee: Pablo González Fuertes

6 October 2023 9	Athletic Bilbao	3–0	Almería	Bilbao
21:00 CEST (UTC+2)	Guruzeta 10'; Herrera (yellow card) 52'; D. García 63'; Sancet 81'; De Marcos (yellow card) 84'	Report		Stadium: San Mamés; Attendance: 43,677; Referee: Víctor García Verdura

21 October 2023 10	Girona	5–2	Almería	Girona
16:15 CEST (UTC+2)	Martín 37'; Dovbyk 39', 43'; López (yellow card) 45+4'; Sávio 71'; Stuani 85'	Report	Baptistão 2', 24', (yellow card) 74'; Robertone (yellow card) 26'; Kébé (yellow card) 90'	Stadium: Montilivi; Attendance: 12,884; Referee: Miguel Ángel Ortiz Arias

28 October 2023 11	Almería	1–2	Las Palmas	Almería
14:00 CEST (UTC+2)	Baba (yellow card) 18'; Robertone (yellow card) 31'; Montes (yellow card) 32'; Ramazani 73'	Report	Munir 23'; S. Cardona (yellow card) 43'; Kaba 90+4'	Stadium: Power Horse Stadium; Attendance: 12,132; Referee: Francisco José Hernández Maeso

5 November 2023 12	Alavés	1–0	Almería	Vitoria-Gasteiz
14:00 CET (UTC+1)	Gorosabel (yellow card) 25'; Hagi (penalty missed) 45+1'; Sedlar 79'; Rioja (yellow card) 81'; Omorodion 48'	Report	Melero (yellow card) 14'; Maximiano (yellow card) 52'; Robertone (yellow card) 59'	Stadium: Mendizorrotza; Attendance: 16,380; Referee: Juan Luis Pulido Santana

11 November 2023 13	Almería	1–3	Real Sociedad	Almería
16:15 CET (UTC+1)	Robertone (yellow card) 27'; Embarba (yellow card) 50'; Arribas 76'	Report	Sadiq (yellow card) 32'; Muñoz (yellow card) 45'; Oyarzabal 62'; Fernández 90+1' (pen.); Zubimendi 90+5'	Stadium: Power Horse Stadium; Attendance: 13,016; Referee: Isidro Díaz de Mera Escuderos

25 November 2023 14	Getafe	2–1	Almería	Getafe
18:30 CET (UTC+1)	Rico (yellow card) 24'; Alderete (yellow card) 28'; Greenwood 33'; Mayoral 45'	Report	Ramazani 7', (yellow card) 63'; González (yellow card) 52'; Baptistão (yellow card) 60'; Baba (yellow card) 64'	Stadium: Coliseum; Attendance: 10,906; Referee: Alejandro Hernández Hernández

3 December 2023 15	Almería	0–0	Real Betis	Almería
16:15 CET (UTC+1)		Report	Bellerín (red card) 27'; Roca (yellow card) 52'; Diao (yellow card) 74'; Silva (yellow card) 83'	Stadium: Power Horse Stadium; Attendance: 14,253; Referee: Alejandro Muñiz Ruiz

10 December 2023 16	Atlético Madrid	2–1	Almería	Madrid
14:00 CET (UTC+1)	Morata 17'; Correa 22'; Koke (yellow card) 90+1'	Report	Baptistão 62'	Stadium: Cívitas Metropolitano; Attendance: 55,473; Referee: Ricardo de Burgos Bengoetxea

17 December 2023 17	Almería	0–0	Mallorca	Almería
14:00 CET (UTC+1)	Baba (yellow card) 73'; Baptistão (yellow card) 83'; Robertone (yellow card) 87'	Report	Nastasić (yellow card) 89'	Stadium: Power Horse Stadium; Attendance: 11,936; Referee: Pablo González Fuertes

20 December 2023 18	Barcelona	3–2	Almería	Barcelona
19:00 CET (UTC+1)	Raphinha (yellow card) 15', (goal) 33'; Christensen (yellow card) 21'; Roberto 60', 83'; Araújo (yellow card) 90'	Report	Pozo (yellow card) 5'; Baptistão 41'; Lopy (yellow card) 57'; González 71'; Baba (yellow card) 85'	Stadium: Estadi Olímpic Lluís Companys; Attendance: 34,471; Referee: Guillermo Cuadra Fernández

4 January 2024 19	Osasuna	1–0	Almería	Pamplona
17:00 CET (UTC+1)	Budimir 27'; Catena (yellow card) 89'	Report	Robertone (yellow card) 29'; Chumi (yellow card) 75'	Stadium: El Sadar; Attendance: 20,391; Referee: César Soto Grado

14 January 2024 20	Almería	0–0	Girona	Almería
14:00 CET (UTC+1)	Baptistão (yellow card) 21'; Akieme (yellow card) 56'; Montes (yellow card) 79'; Kaiky (yellow card) 84'	Report	Valery (yellow card) 34'; Juanpe (yellow card) 65'; Sávio (yellow card) 71'; A. García (red card) 80'; Martínez (yellow card) 90+7'	Stadium: Power Horse Stadium; Attendance: 12,111; Referee: Mateo Busquets Ferrer

21 January 2024 21	Real Madrid	3–2	Almería	Madrid
16:15 CET (UTC+1)	Bellingham 57' (pen.), (yellow card) 90+11'; Vinícius 67'; Camavinga (yellow card) 90+8'; Carvajal 90+9', (yellow card) 90+10'	Report	Ramazani 1', (yellow card) 52'; González 43', (yellow card) 84'; Lopy (yellow card) 64'; Pozo (yellow card) 75'; Suárez (yellow card) 90+11'	Stadium: Santiago Bernabéu; Attendance: 72,044; Referee: Francisco José Hernández Maeso

26 January 2024 22	Almería	0–3	Alavés	Almería
21:00 CET (UTC+1)	González (yellow card) 45+2'	Report	Gorosabel (yellow card) 3'; Omorodion 10', 88'; Rioja 52' (pen.); Guevara (yellow card) 79'	Stadium: Power Horse Stadium; Attendance: 13,817; Referee: Miguel Ángel Ortiz Arias

3 February 2024 23	Valencia	2–1	Almería	Valencia
14:00 CET (UTC+1)	Duro 14'; Yaremchuk 23', (yellow card) 24'; Pepelu (penalty missed) 62'; Guerra (yellow card) 24'; Mosquera (yellow card) 62'; Guillamón (yellow card) 73'	Report	Arribas 50'; Centelles (yellow card) 61'; González (yellow card) 64'; Lozano (yellow card) 72'; Baptistão (red card) 90+3'; Robertone (yellow card) 90+4'; Ramazani (yellow card) 90+4'	Stadium: Mestalla; Attendance: 42,877; Referee: Alejandro Muñiz Ruiz
Note: Baptistão was sent off for dissent after already being substituted out of the match.

12 February 2024 24	Almería	0–0	Athletic Bilbao	Almería
21:00 CET (UTC+1)	Ramazani (yellow card) 27' (yellow-red card) 53'; Pubill (yellow card) 34'; Melero (yellow card) 89'	Report	Sancet (yellow card) 84'	Stadium: Power Horse Stadium; Attendance: 12,863; Referee: Víctor García Verdura

18 February 2024 25	Granada	1–1	Almería	Granada
16:15 CET (UTC+1)	Villar (yellow card) 4'; Gumbau (yellow card) 68'; Uzuni 75'	Report	Pubill 9'; Robertone (yellow card) 77'; Pozo (yellow card) 90'; Radovanović (yellow card) 90+8'	Stadium: Nuevo Los Cármenes; Attendance: 18,756; Referee: Jesús Gil Manzano

24 February 2024 26	Almería	2–2	Atlético Madrid	Almería
21:00 CET (UTC+1)	Romero 27', 64'; Embarba (yellow card) 90+3'	Report	Correa 2'; Mandava (yellow card) 40'; De Paul 57'	Stadium: Power Horse Stadium; Attendance: 14,472; Referee: Javier Alberola Rojas

1 March 2024 27	Celta Vigo	1–0	Almería	Vigo
21:00 CET (UTC+1)	Sánchez (yellow card) 71'; Mingueza 73'	Report	Langa (red card) 65'; Lopy (yellow card) 78'; Radovanović (yellow card) 90'	Stadium: Balaídos; Attendance: 18,005; Referee: José María Sánchez Martínez

11 March 2024 28	Almería	2–2	Sevilla	Almería
21:00 CET (UTC+1)	Embarba 38'; Lopy (yellow card) 84'; Milovanović 90+5'; González (yellow card) 90+6'	Report	Badé (yellow card) 43'; Lukebakio 81'; Ocampos 86'	Stadium: Power Horse Stadium; Attendance: 13,095; Referee: Ricardo de Burgos Bengoetxea

17 March 2024 29	Las Palmas	0–1	Almería	Las Palmas
15:15 WET (UTC±0)	Perrone (yellow card) 26'; Marvin (yellow card) 80'	Report	Centelles (yellow card) 8'; Baptistão 14'; Langa (yellow card) 90+4'	Stadium: Estadio Gran Canaria; Attendance: 22,865; Referee: Víctor García Verdura

30 March 2024 30	Almería	0–3	Osasuna	Almería
16:15 CET (UTC+1)	Baptistão (yellow card) 51'; Robertone (yellow card) 51'; Peña (yellow card) 79'	Report	Arnaiz 2', (yellow card) 37'; Budimir 9'; Areso (yellow card) 44'; Muñoz 61'	Stadium: Power Horse Stadium; Attendance: 10,565; Referee: Pablo González Fuertes

14 April 2024 31	Real Sociedad	2–2	Almeria	San Sebastián
21:00 CEST (UTC+2)	Becker 32'; Oyarzabal 59'; Le Normand (yellow card) 75'; Zubeldia (red card) 87'; Zubimendi (yellow card) 90+4'	Report	Embarba 30', 88'; Romero (yellow card) 36'; Ramazani (yellow card) 90+4'	Stadium: Reale Arena; Attendance: 26,520; Referee: Isidro Díaz de Mera Escuderos

21 April 2024 32	Almería	1–2	Villarreal	Almería
16:15 CEST (UTC+2)	Lozano 30'; Viera (yellow card) 73'; Ramazani (yellow card) 80' (yellow-red card) 87'	Report	Akhomach 25', (yellow card) 50'; Coquelin (yellow card) 59'; Jörgensen (yellow card) 62'; Femenía (yellow card) 88'; Sørloth 90+2'	Stadium: Power Horse Stadium; Attendance: 10,601; Referee: Miguel Ángel Ortiz Arias

27 April 2024 33	Almería	1–3	Getafe	Almería
16:15 CEST (UTC+2)	Montes (yellow card) 38'; Lozano 41'; Embarba (yellow card) 50'; Robertone (yellow card) 55'; Viera (yellow card) 86' (yellow-red card) 90+1'	Report	Alderete (yellow card) 26'; Greenwood 27', 48', (yellow card) 60'; Mata 61'; Martín (yellow card) 86'; Santiago (yellow card) 90+2'	Stadium: Power Horse Stadium; Attendance: 7,874; Referee: Guillermo Cuadra Fernández

5 May 2024 34	Rayo Vallecano	0–1	Almería	Madrid
21:00 CEST (UTC+2)	Falcao (yellow card) 26'; Mumin (yellow card) 82'; Trejo (yellow card) 90+1'	Report	Lozano 30'; Peña (yellow card) 79'; Montes (yellow card) 90+4'	Stadium: Campo de Fútbol de Vallecas; Attendance: 10,864; Referee: Francisco José Hernández Maeso

12 May 2024 35	Real Betis	3–2	Almería	Seville
21:00 CEST (UTC+2)	Fornals 8'; Isco 28'; Pérez 64'	Report	Peña (yellow card) 40'; Baptistão 45+1'; Romero 66'; Chumi (yellow card) 69'	Stadium: Benito Villamarín; Attendance: 48,622; Referee: Alejandro Muñiz Ruiz

16 May 2024 36	Almería	0–2	Barcelona	Almería
21:30 CEST (UTC+2)		Report	López 14', 67'; Vitor Roque (yellow card) 85'	Stadium: Power Horse Stadium; Attendance: 15,543; Referee: Javier Alberola Rojas

19 May 2024 37	Mallorca	2–2	Almería	Palma
19:00 CEST (UTC+2)	Raíllo (yellow card) 18'; Larin 29'; Copete (yellow card) 37'; Darder 83'	Report	Arribas 41', (yellow card) 64'; Romero (yellow card) 45+2'; Robertone (yellow card) 62'; Langa 66'	Stadium: Estadi Mallorca Son Moix; Attendance: 20,573; Referee: Ricardo de Burgos Bengoetxea

25 May 2024 38	Almería	6–1	Cádiz	Almería
18:30 CEST (UTC+2)	Suárez (yellow card) 21', (goal) 65', 71'; Melero 48'; Arribas 51', 86'; Zaldúa 57' (o.g.); Embarba (yellow card) 78'	Report	J. Hernández (yellow card) 13'; Ocampo 30'; Fali (yellow card) 78'	Stadium: Power Horse Stadium; Attendance: 7,558; Referee: Mateo Busquets Ferrer

=== Copa del Rey ===
31 October 2023 First round	Talavera de la Reina	0–2	Almería	Talavera de la Reina
21:00 CET (UTC+1)	Tassembedo (yellow card) 32'; Dago (yellow card) 55'; Fontán (yellow card) 85'	Report	Ramazani 14'; Milovanović 45'; Mendes (yellow card) 60'; Montes (yellow card) 86' (yellow-red card) 90+2'	Stadium: El Prado; Attendance: 3,118; Referee: Mateo Busquets Ferrer

6 December 2023 Second round	Barbastro	1–0	Almería	Barbastro
12:00 CET (UTC+1)	Carbonell 28'; Rausell (yellow card) 61'; Gonpi (yellow card) 69'; García (yellow card) 74'; Val (yellow card) 85'; Crespo (yellow card) 89'; Prat (yellow card) 90'; Jaime (yellow card) 90+4'	Report	González (yellow card) 76'; Ramazani (yellow card) 90+4'	Stadium: Municipal de Deportes; Attendance: 3,000; Referee: Víctor García Verdura

== Statistics ==
=== Goalscorers ===
Position	Players	LaLiga	Copa del Rey	Total
FW	(Spain) Sergio Arribas	9	0	9
MF	(Brazil) Léo Baptistão	6	0	6
FW	(Colombia) Luis Suárez	6	0	6
MF	(Belgium) Largie Ramazani	3	1	4
MF	(Spain) Adri Embarba	3	0	3
FW	(Honduras) Anthony Lozano	3	0	3
MF	(Argentina) Luka Romero	3	0	3
DF	(Spain) Edgar González	2	0	2
FW	(Serbia) Marko Milovanović	1	1	2
DF	(Mozambique) Bruno Langa	1	0	1
MF	(Spain) Gonzalo Melero	1	0	1
DF	(Spain) Marc Pubill	1	0	1
