= 2021–22 UD Almería season =

UD Almería
2021–22 season
- Owner: Turki Al-Sheikh
- President: Turki Al-Sheikh
- Head coach: Rubi
- Stadium: Estadio de los Juegos Mediterráneos
- Segunda División: 1st (promoted)
- Copa del Rey: Round of 32
- Top goalscorer: League: Umar Sadiq (18); All: Umar Sadiq (19)
Home colours	Away colours

The 2021–22 season was the 33rd season in the existence of UD Almería and the club's seventh consecutive season in the second division of Spanish football. In addition to the domestic league, Almería participated in this season's edition of the Copa del Rey.

== Players ==
=== First-team squad ===
As of 22 March 2022

Note: Flags indicate national team as defined under FIFA eligibility rules; some limited exceptions apply. Players may hold more than one non-FIFA nationality.

No.	Pos.	Nation	Player
1	GK	GEO	Giorgi Makaridze
2	DF	ESP	Aitor Buñuel
3	DF	ESP	Iván Martos
4	MF	ESP	Íñigo Eguaras
5	MF	ARG	Lucas Robertone
6	MF	ESP	César de la Hoz (captain)
7	FW	ESP	Juan Villar
8	MF	ESP	Francisco Portillo
9	FW	NGR	Umar Sadiq
10	MF	ESP	Curro Sánchez
11	FW	POR	Dyego Sousa
12	DF	ESP	Juanjo Nieto
13	GK	ESP	Fernando (vice-captain)
14	MF	ESP	Javi Robles
15	DF	ESP	Sergio Akieme

No.	Pos.	Nation	Player
16	MF	ESP	José Carlos Lazo
17	MF	ESP	Alejandro Pozo (on loan from Sevilla)
19	DF	BRA	Rodrigo Ely
20	DF	ESP	Álex Centelles
21	DF	ESP	Chumi
22	DF	SRB	Srđan Babić (on loan from Red Star Belgrade)
23	DF	POR	Daniel Carriço
24	DF	POR	Nélson Monte (on loan from SC Dnipro-1)
26	MF	ESP	Arnau Puigmal
28	FW	ESP	Raúl Caballero
30	MF	POR	Samú Costa
31	FW	ENG	Arvin Appiah
32	MF	BEL	Largie Ramazani
33	GK	ESP	Diego Fuoli

=== Reserve team ===
Note: Flags indicate national team as defined under FIFA eligibility rules; some limited exceptions apply. Players may hold more than one non-FIFA nationality.

No.	Pos.	Nation	Player
29	DF	ESP	David Cuenca (on loan from Real Madrid)
34	FW	ESP	Carlos Rojas
35	DF	ESP	Aitor Puñal

No.	Pos.	Nation	Player
36	MF	ESP	Mamadou Sylla
37	FW	ESP	Carlos Gilbert

=== Out on loan ===
Note: Flags indicate national team as defined under FIFA eligibility rules; some limited exceptions apply. Players may hold more than one non-FIFA nationality.

No.	Pos.	Nation	Player
—	GK	SRB	Dragan Rosić (at Albacete until 30 June 2022)
—	DF	BRA	Jonathan (at Botafogo until 30 June 2022)
—	DF	SRB	Nikola Maraš (at Rayo Vallecano until 30 June 2022)
—	MF	URU	Cristian Olivera (at Peñarol until 30 June 2022)

No.	Pos.	Nation	Player
—	MF	ESP	Dani Albiar (at Alcoyano until 30 June 2022)
—	FW	ESP	Jordi Escobar (at Barcelona B until 30 June 2022)
—	FW	URU	Juan Manuel Gutiérrez (at Nacional until 30 June 2023)

== Pre-season and friendlies ==
Win Draw Loss Fixtures

25 July 2021 Friendly	Águilas	0–1	Almería	Águilas, Spain
19:00 CEST (UTC+2)				Stadium: Estadio El Rubial

31 July 2021 Friendly	Málaga	1–1	Almería	Marbella, Spain
19:00 CEST (UTC+2)				Stadium: Marbella Football Center

1 August 2021 Friendly	Cádiz	1–2	Almería	Marbella, Spain
20:00 CEST (UTC+2)	Osmajić 90+2'		Puigmal 15'; Lazo 64'	Stadium: Marbella Football Center; Referee: Juan Peña Varela

4 August 2021 Friendly	Almería	2–1	Real Betis	Algeciras, Spain
19:00 CEST (UTC+2)	Sadiq 11', 30'		Rober 17'	Stadium: Estadio Nuevo Mirador

8 August 2021 Friendly	Almería	1–0	Betis Deportivo	Marbella, Spain
10:30 CEST (UTC+2)				Stadium: Marbella Football Center

== Competitions ==
=== Overall record ===
Competition	First match	Last match	Starting round	Final position	Record							
Competition	First match	Last match	Starting round	Final position	Pld	W	D	L	GF	GA	GD	Win %
Segunda División	16 August 2021	29 May 2022	Matchday 1	Winners	42	24	9	9	68	35	+33	57.14
Copa del Rey	30 November 2021	6 January 2022	First round	Round of 32	3	1	1	1	4	4	+0	33.33
Total					45	25	10	10	72	39	+33	55.56

Source: Soccerway

=== Segunda División ===
==== League table ====
Pos	Team	Pld	W	D	L	GF	GA	GD	Pts	Qualification or relegation
1	Almería (C, P)	42	24	9	9	68	35	+33	81 (Note: Almería finished ahead of Valladolid on head-to-head points: Almería 3–1 Valladolid, Valladolid 2–2 Almería.)	Promotion to La Liga
2	Valladolid (P)	42	24	9	9	71	43	+28	81	Promotion to La Liga
3	Eibar	42	23	11	8	61	45	+16	80	Qualification for promotion play-offs
4	Las Palmas	42	19	13	10	57	47	+10	70	Qualification for promotion play-offs
5	Tenerife	42	20	9	13	53	37	+16	69	Qualification for promotion play-offs

Source: LaLiga SmartBank
Rules for classification: 1) points; 2) head-to-head points; 3) head-to-head goal difference; 4) goal difference; 5) number of goals scored
(C) Champions; (P) Promoted

==== Results summary ====
Overall								Home						Away					
Pld	W	D	L	GF	GA	GD	Pts	W	D	L	GF	GA	GD	W	D	L	GF	GA	GD
42	24	9	9	68	35	+33	81	14	4	3	38	15	+23	10	5	6	30	20	+10

Last updated: 29 May 2022.
Source: La Liga SmartBank

==== Results by round ====
Round	1	2	3	4	5	6	7	8	9	10	11	12	13	14	15	16	17	18	19	20	21	22	23	24	25	26	27	28	29	30	31	32	33	34	35	36	37	38	39	40	41	42
Ground	A	H	A	H	A	A	H	A	H	A	H	A	H	A	H	A	H	H	A	H	H	A	A	H	A	H	A	H	H	A	H	A	H	A	H	A	H	A	H	A	H	A
Result	W	W	L	W	L	W	W	W	D	L	W	W	W	W	W	W	W	D	D	W	L	D	L	L	L	W	W	W	W	L	D	W	L	D	W	D	W	W	W	W	D	D
Position	1	2	5	2	4	3	1	1	1	2	1	1	1	1	1	1	1	1	1	1	1	1	1	1	3	2	2	2	2	2	2	2	2	3	2	2	2	2	1	1	2	1

Updated to match(es) played on 29 May 2022. Source: La Liga SmartBank
A = Away; H = Home; W = Win; D = Draw; L = Loss

==== Matches ====
The league fixtures were announced on 30 June 2021.

16 August 2021 1	Cartagena	1–3	Almería	Cartagena
22:00 CEST (UTC+2)	Andújar (yellow card) 13'; Luna 49'; Kawaya (yellow card) 90+1'	Report	Buñuel (yellow card) 18'; Sadiq 19', (yellow card) 64'; Ramazani 35', 61'	Stadium: Estadio Cartagonova; Attendance: 4,770; Referee: Aitor Gorostegui Fernández-Ortega

20 August 2021 2	Almería	2–1	Oviedo	Almería
22:00 CEST (UTC+2)	Lazo 5'; Samú (yellow card) 19'; Robertone 47'	Report	Obeng 15'; Calvo (yellow card) 20'; Mier (yellow card) 58'; Montiel (yellow card) 90+3'	Stadium: Estadio de los Juegos Mediterráneos; Referee: Francisco José Hernández Maeso

29 August 2021 3	Amorebieta	2–1	Almería	Amorebieta-Etxano
17:00 CEST (UTC+2)	Bilbao 15'; Obieta 86'	Report	Sánchez 3'	Stadium: Urritxe; Referee: Víctor García Verdura

4 September 2021 4	Almería	2–0	Málaga	Almería
21:00 CEST (UTC+2)	Martos (yellow card) 22' (yellow-red card) 46'; Sadiq 51'; Chumi 58'	Report		Stadium: Estadio de los Juegos Mediterráneos; Referee: Jon Ander González Esteban

12 September 2021 5	Ponferradina	1–0	Almería	Ponferrada
18:15 CEST (UTC+2)	Adot 69'	Report		Stadium: El Toralín; Referee: Dámaso Arcediano Monescillo

17 September 2021 6	Alcorcón	0–4	Almería	Alcorcón
21:00 CEST (UTC+2)	Raúl Asencio (yellow card) 29'; Carlos Hernández (yellow card) 60'; Antonio Moyano (yellow card) 86'; Juan Hernández (yellow card) 90+2'	Report	Sadiq 5' 16'; Ramazani (yellow card) 36'; Dani Jiménez 37' (o.g.); Alejandro Pozo 69'; Samú Costa (yellow card) 78'	Stadium: Santo Domingo; Attendance: 1,559; Referee: Raúl Martín González Francés

24 September 2021 7	Almería	3–1	Tenerife	Almería
21:00 CEST (UTC+2)	Ramazani 72' (pen.); Robertone (yellow card) 74'; Sadiq 75'; Šipčić 87' (o.g.); Juanjo Nieto (yellow card) 90+2'	Report	Šipčić (yellow card) 70'; Aitor Sanz (yellow card) 73'; Carlos Ruiz (yellow card) 75'; Shashoua 81' (pen.)	Stadium: Estadio de los Juegos Mediterráneos; Attendance: 7,074; Referee: Rubén Ávalos Barrera

4 October 2021 8	Girona	1–2	Almería	Girona
21:00 CET	Espinosa (yellow card) 40' (goal) 62'; Álex Baena (yellow card) 76'	Report	Sadiq (yellow card) 34' (goal) 52'; Robertone 68' (yellow card) 87'; Álex Centelles (yellow card) 71'	Stadium: Estadi Montilivi; Attendance: 4,904; Referee: Juan Luis Pulido Santana

9 October 2021 9	Almería	1–1	Las Palmas	Almería
18:15 CET	Chumi (yellow card) 21'; Portillo 32'; Dyego Sousa (yellow card) 84'	Report	Sergi Cardona (yellow card) 36'; Ferigra (yellow card) 56'; Eric Curbelo (yellow card) 67'; Loiodice (yellow card) 73'; Jonathan Viera 90'	Stadium: Estadio de los Juegos Mediterráneos; Attendance: 8,734; Referee: Saúl Ais Reig

15 October 2021 10	Eibar	1–0	Almería	Eibar
21:00 CET	Stoichkov 39'; Álvaro Tejero (yellow card) 58'; Javi Muñoz (yellow card) 84'; Yoel (yellow card) 90+1'	Report	Álex Centelles (yellow card) 18'; Portillo (yellow card) 60'; Dyego Sousa (yellow card) 83'; Samú Costa (yellow card) 87'	Stadium: Ipurua Municipal Stadium; Attendance: 3,630; Referee: José Antonio López Toca

21 October 2021 11	Almería	3–1	Real Sociedad B	Almería
18:45 CET	José Carlos Lazo 4'; Sadiq 75'; Alejandro Pozo 87'	Report	Jon Magunazelaia 20'	Stadium: Estadio de los Juegos Mediterráneos; Attendance: 7,697; Referee: Javier Iglesias Villanueva

24 October 2021 12	Mirandés	1–4	Almería	Miranda de Ebro
14:00 CET	Oriol Rey (yellow card) 25'; Capellini (yellow card) 29'; Iñigo Vicente 72' (pen.)	Report	Dyego Sousa 5' 23' 53'; Arnau Puigmal 26'; Iván Martos (yellow card) 49'; César de la Hoz (yellow card) 60'; José Carlos Lazo (yellow card) 90+6'	Stadium: Estadio Municipal de Anduva; Attendance: 2,365; Referee: Jon Ander González Esteban

29 October 2021 13	Almería	1–0	Leganés	Almería
21:00 CET	Portillo 30'; Sergio Akieme (yellow card) 89'	Report	Ranđelović (yellow card) 5'; Sergio González (red card) 90+2'	Stadium: Estadio de los Juegos Mediterráneos; Attendance: 8,867; Referee: Iosu Galech Apezteguía

2 November 2021 14	Sporting Gijón	0–1	Almería	Gijón
19:00 CET	Pablo García (yellow card) 83'	Report	Sadiq (yellow card) 73'; José Carlos Lazo 90+3' (yellow card) 90+3'	Stadium: El Molinón; Attendance: 11,980; Referee: Álvaro Moreno Aragón

7 November 2021 15	Almería	2–0	Burgos	Almería
18:15 CET	José Carlos Lazo 2'; Curro Sánchez (yellow card) 62'; César de la Hoz (yellow card) 74'; Sadiq (yellow card) 80'; Samú Costa (yellow card) 89'; Arnau Puigmal 90+5'	Report	Unai Elgezabal (yellow card) 42'; Míchel Zabaco (yellow card) 48'; Grego (yellow card) 51'; Miki Muñoz (yellow card) 63'; Caro (yellow card) 82'; Juanma (yellow card) 90+3'	Stadium: Estadio de los Juegos Mediterráneos; Attendance: 9,513; Referee: Aitor Gorostegui Fernández Ortega

14 November 2021 16	Ibiza	0–1	Almería	Ibiza
16:00 CET	Javi Lara (yellow card) 45'; Manu Molina (yellow card) 57'	Report	Dyego Sousa (yellow card) 21' (goal) 45+1' (pen.); Babić (yellow card) 55'; Curro Sánchez (yellow card) 61'	Stadium: Estadi Municipal de Can Misses; Attendance: 4,937; Referee: Eduardo Prieto Iglesias

20 November 2021 17	Almería	3–1	Real Valladolid	Almería
20:30 CET	Samú Costa (yellow card) 45+2'; Ramazani 52'; Sergio Akieme 70'; César de la Hoz (yellow card) 77'; Portillo 86'; Babić (yellow card) 90+2'	Report	César de la Hoz 8' (o.g.); Luis Pérez (yellow card) 30'; Óscar Plano (red card) 37'; Sergio León (yellow card) 42'	Stadium: Estadio de los Juegos Mediterráneos; Attendance: 9,208; Referee: Javier Iglesias Villanueva

27 November 2021 18	Almería	0–0	Huesca	Almería
18:15 CET	Sergio Akieme (yellow card) 83'	Report	Gaich (yellow card) 19'; Jorge Pulido (yellow card) 23'; Rațiu (yellow card) 32'; Joaquín Muñoz (yellow card) 33'; Miguel (yellow card) 90+6'	Stadium: Estadio de los Juegos Mediterráneos; Attendance: 9,486; Referee: David Gálvez Rascón

4 December 2021 19	Fuenlabrada	1–1	Almería	Fuenlabrada
18:15 CET	Zozulya 53'; Pedro León (yellow card) 65'; Cristóbal (yellow card) 67'	Report	Samú Costa (yellow card) 35'; Babić (yellow card) 51'; Juan Villar 72' (yellow card) 88'	Stadium: Estadio Fernando Torres; Attendance: 2,052; Referee: Juan Luis Pulido Santana

11 December 2021 20	Almería	3–0	Real Zaragoza	Almería
18:15 CET	Samú Costa (yellow card) 37'; Babić (yellow card) 58'; Sadiq 61'; Alejandro Pozo 86'; Ramazani 90+1'	Report		Stadium: Estadio de los Juegos Mediterráneos; Attendance: 9,258; Referee: Francisco José Hernández Maeso

2 January 2022 22	Almería	0–1	FC Cartagena	Almería
14:00 CET		Report	Boateng (yellow card) 35'; Alberto Cayarga (yellow card) 40'; Silva (yellow card) 36' (goal) 39'; Alcalá (yellow card) 50'; de Blasis (yellow card) 65'; Nacho Gil (red card) 90+3'	Stadium: Estadio de los Juegos Mediterráneos; Attendance: 7,058; Referee: Raúl Martín González Francés

9 January 2022 23	Las Palmas	1–1	Almería	Las Palmas
21:30 CET	Jonathan Viera 37' (yellow card) 52'; Sergi Cardona (yellow card) 54'; Pinchi (yellow card) 59'; Peñaranda (yellow card) 90+2'	Report	Robertone (yellow card) 18'; Appiah 51'; César de la Hoz (yellow card) 55'; Babić (yellow card) 61'	Stadium: Estadio Gran Canaria; Attendance: 9,827; Referee: David Gálvez Rascón

19 January 2022 21	Lugo	2–1	Almería	Lugo
21:00 CET	Manu Barreiro 4'; Chris Ramos 23'; Juan Antonio Ros (yellow card) 40'; José Ángel Carrillo (yellow card) 90'; Ricard Sánchez (yellow card) 90+5'; Juanpe (red card) 90+5'	Report	Juanjo Nieto (yellow card) 40'; Babić (yellow card) 86'; Carlos Pita 88' (o.g.); Ramazani (yellow card) 90+5'; Curro Sánchez (yellow card) 90+7'	Stadium: Estadio Anxo Carro; Referee: Gorka Sagues Oscoz

24 January 2022 24	Almería	0–2	Eibar	Almería
21:00 CET	Samú Costa (yellow card) 46'	Report	Edu Expósito 9'; Stoichkov (yellow card) 49'; Sergio Álvarez (yellow card) 59'; Toño (yellow card) 72'; Quique González 81'	Stadium: Estadio de los Juegos Mediterráneos; Attendance: 7,843; Referee: Daniel Trujillio

29 January 2022 25	Real Oviedo	2–0	Almería	Oviedo
21:00 CET	Luismi (yellow card) 20'; Borja Bastón 24'; Jimmy Suárez (yellow card) 51'; Babić 67' (o.g.)	Report	Robertone (yellow card) 27'; Iván Martos (yellow card) 40'; Ramazani (yellow card) 59'	Stadium: Estadio Carlos Tartiere; Attendance: 10,543; Referee: Javier Iglesias

4 February 2022 26	Almería	2–0	Ibiza	Almería
21:00 CET	Portillo (yellow card) 23'; Ramazani (yellow card) 38' (goal) 58' (pen.); Arnau Puigmal (yellow card) 46'; Sadiq 90+2'	Report	Diop (yellow card) 33'; Cristian (yellow card) 38'; Cifu (yellow card) 38'; Álex Gálvez (yellow card) 72' (yellow-red card) 73'	Stadium: Estadio de los Juegos Mediterráneos; Attendance: 7,993; Referee: Álvaro Moreno Aragón

12 February 2022 27	Málaga	0–1	Almería	Málaga
20:30 CET	Alberto Escassi (yellow card) 21'; Peybernes (yellow card) 75'; Víctor Gómez (yellow card) 90+3'	Report	Sergio Akieme (yellow card) 34'; Sadiq 53'; Robertone (yellow card) 86'	Stadium: La Rosaleda Stadium; Attendance: 17,267; Referee: Jon González Esteban

20 February 2022 28	Almería	2–1	Mirandés	Almería
21:00 CET	César de la Hoz (yellow card) 42'; Portillo (yellow card) 45'; Sadiq 69' 72'; Samú Costa (yellow card) 88'	Report	Sergio Camello (yellow card) 40' (goal) 90+9'; Iñigo Vicente (yellow card) 45'; Arroyo (yellow card) 70'	Stadium: Estadio de los Juegos Mediterráneos; Attendance: 8,432; Referee: Aitor Gorostegui Fernández

25 February 2022 29	Almería	3–1	Fuenlabrada	Almería
21:00 CET	Babić (yellow card) 15'; Ramazani (yellow card) 27'; Arnau Puigmal 31'; Sadiq 65'; Íñigo Eguaras (yellow card) 75'; Dyego Sousa 77'; Curro Sánchez (yellow card) 88'	Report	Bouldini 36'; Tachi (yellow card) 90+1'; Javier Ontiveros (yellow card) 90+4'	Stadium: Estadio de los Juegos Mediterráneos; Attendance: 8,506; Referee: Víctor García Verdura

4 March 2022 30	Real Zaragoza	2–0	Almería	Zaragoza
21:00 CET	Álvarez (yellow card) 8'; Francho Serrano 13'; Iván Azón 79'	Report		Stadium: La Romareda; Attendance: 14,000; Referee: (Spain) Daniel Trujillo Suárez

12 March 2022 31	Almería	3–3	Lugo	Almería
18:15 CET	Sadiq 13' 49'; Clavería 72' (o.g.)	Report	Ricard Sánchez 37'; Clavería 67' (yellow card) 90+5'; José Ángel Carrillo 79'	Stadium: Estadio de los Juegos Mediterráneos; Attendance: 10,053; Referee: (Spain) Juan Pulido Santana

21 March 2022 32	Tenerife	0–1	Almería	Santa Cruz de Tenerife
21:00 CET	Álex Corredera (yellow card) 45+1'; Aitor Sanz (yellow card) 58'; Moore (yellow card) 60'	Report	Ramazani 58' (pen.); Samú Costa (yellow card) 64'; Babić (yellow card) 69'	Stadium: Estadio Heliodoro Rodríguez López; Attendance: 15,007; Referee: (Spain) Olivier De La Fuente

27 March 2022 33	Almería	0–1	Girona	Almería
21:00 CET	Rodrigo Ely (yellow card) 45+1'; Alejandro Pozo (yellow card) 51'	Report	Borja García 13' (red card) 90+1'; Pol Lozano (yellow card) 19'; Bueno (yellow card) 49'; Víctor Sánchez (yellow card) 78'; Juan Carlos (yellow card) 80'; Aleix García (yellow card) 83'; Ramon Terrats (yellow card) 89'	Stadium: Estadio de los Juegos Mediterráneos; Attendance: 9,260; Referee: (Spain) Gorka Sagués Oscoz

3 April 2022 34	Huesca	1–1	Almería	Huesca
18:15 CET	Ignasi Miquel 11'; Timor (yellow card) 61'; Joaquín Muñoz (yellow card) 89'	Report	Robertone 21'; Rodrigo Ely (yellow card) 23'; Sergio Akieme (red card) 65'; José Carlos Lazo (yellow card) 82'; Juan Villar (red card) 90+2'	Stadium: Estadio El Alcoraz; Attendance: 5,832; Referee: (Spain) José López Toca

11 April 2022 35	Almería	3–0	Ponferradina	Almería
21:00 CET	Sadiq 16'; Arnau Puigmal 52'; Íñigo Eguaras 90+1'	Report		Stadium: Estadio de los Juegos Mediterráneos; Attendance: 9,836; Referee: (Spain) Daniel Trujillo Suárez

16 April 2022 36	Real Valladolid	2–2	Almería	Valladolid
18:15 CET	Roque Mesa 23' (yellow card) 57'; Toni Villa (yellow card) 24' (goal) 48'	Report	Ramazani 20'; Sergio Akieme (yellow card) 21'; Samú Costa (yellow card) 58'; Íñigo Eguaras (yellow card) 73'; Arnau Puigmal (yellow card) 77'; Rodrigo Ely 88'; César de la Hoz (yellow card) 90'; Sadiq (yellow card) 90+6'	Stadium: Estadio José Zorrilla; Attendance: 19,608; Referee: (Spain) Francisco Hernández Maeso

25 April 2022 37	Almería	1–0	Sporting Gijón	Almería
21:00 CET	Rodrigo Ely (yellow card) 40'; Curro Sánchez 90+1'	Report	Aitor García (yellow card) 34'; Juan Berrocal (yellow card) 66'	Stadium: Estadio de los Juegos Mediterráneos; Attendance: 9,897; Referee: (Spain) Jon González Esteban

30 April 2022 38	Burgos	0–2	Almería	Burgos
20:30 CET	Grego (yellow card) 55'; Unai Elgezabal (yellow card) 81'	Report	Robertone 17' (yellow card) 53'; Grego 44' (o.g.); Arnau Puigmal (yellow card) 87'	Stadium: Estadio El Plantío; Attendance: 8,479; Referee: (Spain) Juan Pulido Santana

7 May 2022 39	Almería	3–0	Amorebieta	Almería
18:15 CET	Andoni López 54' (o.g.); Babić 75'; Sadiq 89'	Report	Andoni López (yellow card) 52'; Jon Irazabal (yellow card) 71'; Olaetxea (yellow card) 90+5'	Stadium: Estadio de los Juegos Mediterráneos; Attendance: 13,478; Referee: (Spain) Javier Iglesias Villanueva

13 May 2022 40	Real Sociedad B	0–2	Almería	San Sebastián
21:00 CET	Aritz Arambarri (yellow card) 19'; Andoni Zubiaurre (yellow card) 57'; Beñat Turrientes (yellow card) 70'; Julen Lobete (yellow card) 82'; Álex Sola (yellow card) 90'	Report	Rodrigo Ely (yellow card) 17' (goal) 28'; Appiah (yellow card) 45+1'; José Carlos Lazo 68'	Stadium: Reale Arena; Attendance: 8,140; Referee: (Spain) Iván Caparrós Hernández

21 May 2022 41	Almería	1–1	Alcorcón	Almería
22:00 CET	Ramazani (yellow card) 10'; Samú Costa (yellow card) 45+4'; César de la Hoz (yellow card) 90'; Arnau Puigmal 90+3'	Report	José Carlos (yellow card) 45+2'; Iván Calero (yellow card) 45+4'; Chus Ruiz (yellow card) 77'; Zarfino 81' (yellow card) 82'	Stadium: Estadio de los Juegos Mediterráneos; Attendance: 14,759; Referee: (Spain) Raúl González Francés

29 May 2022 42	Leganés	2–2	Almería	Leganés
20:00 CET	Borja Garcés 9'; Omeruo 42' (yellow card) 84'; Sergi Palencia (yellow card) 48'; Bruno (yellow card) 57'; Asier Riesgo (yellow card) 82'	Report	Rodrigo Ely 15' (yellow card) 90+6'; Babić (yellow card) 25'; Sadiq 53'; Dyego Sousa (yellow card) 90'	Stadium: Estadio Municipal de Butarque; Attendance: 8,645; Referee: (Spain) Dámaso Arcediano Monescillo

=== Copa del Rey ===
30 November 2021 First Round	Águilas	1–1 (a.e.t.) (3–5 p)	Almería	Águilas
21:00 CET	Kalu Uche 58' (yellow card) 120+1'; Amour Loussoukou (yellow card) 78'	Report	Juan Villar 32'; Javi Robles (yellow card) 59'	Stadium: Estadio El Rubial; Referee: (Spain) Saúl Ais Reig

16 December 2021 Second Round	Amorebieta	1–2	Almería	Amorebieta-Etxano
19:00 CET	Aitor Aldalur (yellow card) 18'; Iñigo Orozco 56'; Aitor Arregi (yellow card) 76'	Report	Sadiq 24'; Appiah 61'; Robertone (yellow card) 68'	Stadium: Urritxe; Referee: (Spain) Eduardo Prieto Iglesias

6 January 2022 Round Of 32	Almería	1–2	Elche	Almería
20:00 CET	Ramazani 42'; Javi Robles (yellow card) 56'; Dyego Sousa (yellow card) 65'; Appiah (yellow card) 66'; Samú Costa (yellow card) 68'; Álex Centelles (yellow card) 83'	Report	Barragán (yellow card) 49'; Piatti 52'; Diego González (yellow card) 64'; Gonzalo Verdú (yellow card) 66'; Pere Milla (yellow card) 68'; Raúl Guti 84'; Josema (yellow card) 90'	Stadium: Estadio de los Juegos Mediterráneos; Referee: (Spain) Alejandro Hernández Hernández

== Player statistics ==
=== Appearances and goals ===
As of 11 July 2022

No.	Pos	Nat	Player	Total		Segunda División		Copa del Rey	
No.	Pos	Nat	Player	Apps	Goals	Apps	Goals	Apps	Goals
Goalkeepers
1	GK	(Georgia (country)) GEO	Giorgi Makaridze	4	0	1	0	3	0
13	GK	(Spain) ESP	Fernando	42	0	41	0	0+1	0
33	GK	(Spain) ESP	Diego Fuoli	0	0	0	0	0	0
Defenders
2	DF	(Spain) ESP	Aitor Buñuel	14	0	8+5	0	1	0
3	DF	(Spain) ESP	Iván Martos	14	0	8+3	0	2+1	0
12	DF	(Spain) ESP	Juanjo Nieto	19	0	4+12	0	3	0
15	DF	(Equatorial Guinea) GEQ	Sergio Akieme	32	1	25+5	1	2	0
19	DF	(Brazil) BRA	Rodrigo Ely	12	3	12	3	0	0
20	DF	(Spain) ESP	Álex Centelles	23	0	17+5	0	1	0
21	DF	(Spain) ESP	Chumi	27	1	24+1	1	1+1	0
22	DF	(Serbia) SRB	Srđan Babić	40	1	35+2	1	3	0
23	DF	(Portugal) POR	Daniel Carriço	6	0	3+3	0	0	0
24	DF	(Portugal) POR	Nélson Monte	0	0	0	0	0	0
29	DF	(Spain) ESP	David Cuenca	0	0	0	0	0	0
35	DF	(Spain) ESP	Aitor Puñal	0	0	0	0	0	0
Midfielders
4	MF	(Spain) ESP	Íñigo Eguaras	14	1	6+8	1	0	0
5	MF	(Argentina) ARG	Lucas Robertone	27	4	24+2	4	1	0
6	MF	(Spain) ESP	César de la Hoz	43	0	35+5	0	1+2	0
8	MF	(Spain) ESP	Francisco Portillo	40	3	32+7	3	0+1	0
10	MF	(Spain) ESP	Curro Sánchez	37	2	11+24	2	1+1	0
14	MF	(Spain) ESP	Javi Robles	10	0	1+9	0	0	0
16	MF	(Spain) ESP	José Carlos Lazo	33	5	15+17	5	0+1	0
17	MF	(Spain) ESP	Alejandro Pozo	40	3	34+5	3	0+1	0
26	MF	(Spain) ESP	Arnau Puigmal	34	5	13+20	5	1	0
30	MF	(Portugal) POR	Samú Costa	40	0	38	0	1+1	0
32	MF	(Belgium) BEL	Largie Ramazani	33	9	25+5	8	1+2	1
36	MF	(Spain) ESP	Mamadou Sylla	0	0	0	0	0	0
Forwards
7	FW	(Spain) ESP	Juan Villar	14	2	1+11	1	2	1
9	FW	(Nigeria) NGR	Umar Sadiq	38	19	34+2	18	1+1	1
11	FW	(Portugal) POR	Dyego Sousa	26	5	4+20	5	1+1	0
28	FW	(Spain) ESP	Raúl Caballero	4	0	0+3	0	0+1	0
31	FW	(England) ENG	Arvin Appiah	35	2	11+21	1	3	1
34	FW	(Spain) ESP	Carlos Rojas	0	0	0	0	0	0
37	FW	(Spain) ESP	Carlos Gilbert	2	0	0+1	0	1	0
Players on loan to other clubs
18	DF	(Serbia) SRB	Nikola Maraš	0	0	0	0	0	0
27	MF	(Spain) ESP	Dani Albiar	0	0	0	0	0	0
34	FW	(Uruguay) URU	Juan Manuel Gutiérrez	0	0	0	0	0	0
—	GK	(Serbia) SRB	Dragan Rosić	0	0	0	0	0	0
—	DF	(Brazil) BRA	Jonathan	0	0	0	0	0	0
—	MF	(Uruguay) URU	Cristian Olivera	0	0	0	0	0	0
—	FW	(Spain) ESP	Jordi Escobar	0	0	0	0	0	0
Players who left the club midway through the season
4	DF	(Spain) ESP	Juan Ibiza	0	0	0	0	0	0
—	MF	(Spain) ESP	Sergio Aguza	0	0	0	0	0	0
—	MF	(Argentina) ARG	Valentín Vada	0	0	0	0	0	0

=== Top scorers ===
Place	Position	Nation	Number	Name	Segunda División	Copa del Rey	Total
1	FW	(Nigeria)	9	Umar Sadiq	18	1	19
2	MF	(Belgium)	32	Largie Ramazani	8	1	9
3	FW	(Portugal)	11	Dyego Sousa	5	0	5
3	MF	(Spain)	16	José Carlos Lazo	5	0	5
3	MF	(Spain)	26	Arnau Puigmal	5	0	5
6	MF	(Argentina)	5	Lucas Robertone	4	0	4
7	MF	(Spain)	8	Francisco Portillo	3	0	3
7	MF	(Spain)	17	Alejandro Pozo	3	0	3
7	DF	(Brazil)	19	Rodrigo Ely	3	0	3
10	MF	(Spain)	10	Curro Sánchez	2	0	2
10	FW	(Spain)	7	Juan Villar	1	1	2
10	FW	(England)	31	Arvin Appiah	1	1	2
13	MF	(Spain)	4	Íñigo Eguaras	1	0	1
13	DF	(Spain)	15	Sergio Akieme	1	0	1
13	DF	(Spain)	21	Chumi	1	0	1
13	DF	(Serbia)	22	Srđan Babić	1	0	1
Own goals					6	0	6
				TOTALS	68	4	72

=== Disciplinary record ===
Number	Nation	Position	Name	Segunda División			Copa del Rey			Total		
Number	Nation	Position	Name	Yellow card	(yellow card) (yellow-red card)	Red card	Yellow card	(yellow card) (yellow-red card)	Red card	Yellow card	(yellow card) (yellow-red card)	Red card
30	(Portugal)	MF	Samú Costa	12	0	0	1	0	0	13	0	0
22	(Serbia)	DF	Srđan Babić	10	0	0	0	0	0	10	0	0
5	(Argentina)	MF	Lucas Robertone	7	0	1	1	0	0	8	0	1
6	(Spain)	MF	César de la Hoz	7	0	0	0	0	0	7	0	0
32	(Belgium)	MF	Largie Ramazani	7	0	0	0	0	0	7	0	0
9	(Nigeria)	FW	Umar Sadiq	6	0	0	0	0	0	6	0	0
19	(Brazil)	DF	Rodrigo Ely	5	0	0	0	0	0	5	0	0
11	(Portugal)	FW	Dyego Sousa	4	0	0	1	0	0	5	0	0
15	(Spain)	DF	Sergio Akieme	4	0	1	0	0	0	4	0	1
10	(Spain)	MF	Curro Sánchez	4	0	0	0	0	0	4	0	0
3	(Spain)	DF	Iván Martos	3	1	0	0	0	0	3	1	0
8	(Spain)	MF	Francisco Portillo	3	0	0	0	0	0	3	0	0
16	(Spain)	MF	José Carlos Lazo	3	0	0	0	0	0	3	0	0
26	(Spain)	MF	Arnau Puigmal	3	0	0	0	0	0	3	0	0
20	(Spain)	DF	Álex Centelles	2	0	0	1	0	0	3	0	0
4	(Spain)	MF	Íñigo Eguaras	2	0	0	0	0	0	2	0	0
12	(Spain)	DF	Juanjo Nieto	2	0	0	0	0	0	2	0	0
14	(Spain)	MF	Javi Robles	0	0	0	2	0	0	2	0	0
31	(England)	FW	Arvin Appiah	1	0	0	1	0	0	2	0	0
7	(Spain)	FW	Juan Villar	1	0	1	0	0	0	1	0	1
1	(Georgia (country))	GK	Giorgi Makaridze	1	0	0	0	0	0	1	0	0
2	(Spain)	DF	Aitor Buñuel	1	0	0	0	0	0	1	0	0
17	(Spain)	MF	Alejandro Pozo	1	0	0	0	0	0	1	0	0
21	(Spain)	DF	Chumi	1	0	0	0	0	0	1	0	0
			TOTALS	90	1	3	7	0	0	97	1	3
