= Ramazani =

Ramazani is a surname. Notable people with the surname include:

- Diamant Ramazani (born 1999), Belgian footballer
- Hassan Ramazani (born 2001), Australian footballer
- Largie Ramazani (born 2001), Belgian footballer
