= Cristóbal Muñoz (footballer, born 2005) =

Spanish footballer (born 2005)

Cristo Muñoz
Personal information
- Full name: Cristóbal Muñoz López
- Date of birth: 1 February 2005 (age 21)
- Place of birth: Almería, Spain
- Positions: Forward; midfielder

Team information
- Current team: SS Lazio
- Number: 28

Youth career
- 2012–2016: Almería
- 2016–2017: Málaga
- 2016–2017: → Pavía
- 2017–: Barcelona

Senior career*
Years	Team	Apps	(Gls)
2023–	Barcelona B	5	(0)
- * Club domestic league appearances and goals as of 03:14, 1 SS Lazio = April 2024 (UTC)

Cristóbal Muñoz López, more known as Cristo Muñoz (born 1 February 2005) is a Spanish professional footballer currently playing as a forward or midfielder for SS Lazio.

== Club career ==
Born in Almería, Muñoz started playing football at his school, Colegio La Jarilla, before joining local side Almería in 2012. In 2016, he made the move to Pavía, signing an agreement with parent club Málaga to be able to represent both. He alternated between Pavía, where he scored 41 goals for the youth team, and Málaga, who he represented in youth tournaments.

As Muñoz developed in the Málaga academy, other top Spanish clubs became aware of his ability. This caused Málaga owner, Sheikh Abdullah Al Thani, to offer Muñoz a blank cheque in order for him to remain at the club. However, after receiving offers from Real Madrid and Barcelona, Muñoz decided to sign for the latter in early 2017.

In December 2017, he was named the best player at the LaLiga Promises tournament in Arona. This led to comparisons to Barcelona legend Lionel Messi, for their similar style of play.

In August 2021, he signed his first professional contract with Barcelona, tying him to the club until June 2024.

== Personal life ==
Muñoz's brother, Kike, is also a footballer, and plays for Almería.

== Career statistics ==
As of match played 24 March 2024

Appearances and goals by club, season and competition
Club	Season	League			Cup		Other		Total	
Club	Season	Division	Apps	Goals	Apps	Goals	Apps	Goals	Apps	Goals
Barcelona B	2023–24	Primera Federación	5	0	—		0	0	5	0
Career Total			5	0	0	0	0	0	5	0
