= Raúl Caballero =

Raúl Caballero may refer to:

- Raúl Caballero (footballer, born 1978), Spanish footballer
- Raúl Caballero (footballer, born 2001), Spanish footballer
