= Pedro Benito =

Spanish footballer

Personal information
- Full name: Pedro Alberto Benito Ponomar
- Date of birth: 27 March 2000 (age 26)
- Place of birth: Cádiz, Spain
- Height: 1.82 m (6 ft 0 in)
- Position: Forward

Team information
- Current team: Murcia
- Number: 9

Youth career
- 2005–2008: El Puerto de Santa María
- 2008–2012: Pavía
- 2012–2014: Almería
- 2014–2015: Swansea City
- 2015–2016: Almería
- 2016: Anorthosis Famagusta
- 2016–2017: Pavía
- 2017–2018: Canillas

College career
Years	Team	Apps	(Gls)
2018	Oklahoma Wesleyan Eagles		
2019	GW Runnin' Bulldogs	19	(5)

Senior career*
Years	Team	Apps	(Gls)
2017	Pavía	9	(0)
2020–2021	UCAM Murcia B	23	(13)
2021–2022	Cádiz B	10	(1)
2021–2022	Cádiz	1	(0)
2022	→ San Fernando (loan)	22	(3)
2022–2023	SS Reyes	29	(6)
2023–2024	Albacete	7	(0)
2024–	Murcia	71	(10)
- * Club domestic league appearances and goals as of 10 June 2026

Pedro Alberto Benito Ponomar (born 27 March 2000) is a Spanish footballer who plays as a forward for Real Murcia CF.

== Club career ==
Born in Cádiz, Andalusia, Benito represented RCN El Puerto de Santa María, UD Pavía (two stints), UD Almería (two stints), Swansea City, Anorthosis Famagusta FC and CD Canillas as a youth. In January 2018, after already making his senior debut with Pavía's first team in the regional leagues, he moved to the United States after accepting a Business Administration and Sport Management degree at the Oklahoma Wesleyan University.

After spending the 2018 season with Oklahoma Wesleyan Eagles, Benito played the 2019 campaign for the Gardner–Webb University's Runnin' Bulldogs side. He returned to his home country in 2020, after joining UCAM Murcia CF's reserves in Tercera División.

On 27 May 2021, Benito signed a two-year deal with Cádiz CF, being initially assigned to the B-team in Segunda División RFEF. He made his first team – and La Liga – debut on 2 October, coming on as a second-half substitute for Álvaro Negredo in a 0–0 home draw against Valencia CF.

On 30 November 2021, Benito was loaned to Primera División RFEF side San Fernando CD for the remainder of the season, effective as of the following January. On 2 July 2022, he signed for fellow third division side UD San Sebastián de los Reyes.

On 19 June 2023, Benito signed a two-year contract with Albacete Balompié in Segunda División. After being rarely used, he terminated his link on 28 June of the following year, and joined third division side Real Murcia CF just hours later.

== Personal life ==
Benito's father Alberto was also a footballer. A midfielder, he also played for Cádiz. His mother is Ukrainian.

A supporter of Cádiz, Benito is also a well-known personality on TikTok, having more than one million followers on his account.

== International career ==
He has expressed his interest in playing for the Ukraine national team.
