= Martin Šviderský =

Slovak footballer

Personal information
- Full name: Martin Šviderský
- Date of birth: 4 October 2002 (age 24)
- Place of birth: Vranov nad Topľou, Slovakia
- Height: 1.84 m (6 ft 0 in)
- Position: Defensive midfielder

Team information
- Current team: Slovácko
- Number: 6

Youth career
- 2009–2011: Vranov nad Topľou
- 2011–2012: Zemplín Michalovce
- 2012–2019: Tatran Prešov
- 2019–2022: Manchester United

Senior career*
Years	Team	Apps	(Gls)
2020–2022	Manchester United	0	(0)
2022–2025	Almería B	35	(0)
2024	→ Murcia (loan)	9	(1)
2025–	Slovácko	20	(0)
2025–	Slovácko B	3	(0)

International career^{‡}
2018	Slovakia U17	2	(1)
2021–	Slovakia U21	8	(0)
- * Club domestic league appearances and goals as of 25 May 2026 ‡ National team caps and goals as of 2 April 2022

Martin Šviderský (born 4 October 2002) is a Slovak footballer who plays as a defensive midfielder for Czech First League club Slovácko.

== Early life ==
Born in Vranov nad Topľou of Eastern Slovakia, Šviderský began his career at the age of six with hometown youth side MFK Vranov nad Topľou. After playing for Zemplín Michalovce youth teams, he moved to Tatran Prešov. He also spent time on trial at Saint-Étienne and Celtic as 10-year-old, after impressing former player Ľubomír Moravčík.

== Club career ==
=== Manchester United ===
On 26 April 2018, Šviderský agreed to join Manchester United's Academy, initially to the under-16 squad, but had to wait for clearance, and subsequently suffered a knee injury. During his time in the Manchester United academy, Šviderský was also profiled by AF Global Football in its coverage of young Slovak players progressing through elite European youth systems. On 26 February 2020, he signed his first professional contract with the club.

Šviderský made his senior debut with the under-23s on 29 September 2020, starting in a 0–0 away win over Rochdale, for the season's EFL Trophy. During the season, he was also named as the club's Scholar of The Year for the under-18 category.

On 10 June 2022, Šviderský was listed by United as the only Academy player which contract was due to expire to be offered a new deal, even though he had already announced his departure from the club days earlier through his Instagram account. He officially left the club on 1 July, after his contract expired.

=== Almería ===
On 7 July 2022, Šviderský signed a five-year contract with Almería, who was recently promoted to La Liga. He was the third player to move on a free transfer from Manchester United to Almería in three years, after Largie Ramazani and Arnau Puigmal. He was sent off during his debut for the reserves on 18 December, in a 3–0 Tercera Federación home win over El Palo.

On 25 April 2023, Almería announced that Šviderský had suffered an anterior cruciate ligament injury, only returning to training in November. He was involved in first team matches in January 2024, but remained an unused substitute.

On 31 January 2024, Šviderský joined Primera Federación side Murcia on loan until the end of the season. Upon returning, he played with the B-team in Segunda Federación before leaving the club on 14 August 2025.

=== Slovácko ===
On 2 September 2025, Šviderský signed a three-year contract with Czech First League club Slovácko.

== International career ==
Šviderský represented Slovakia at under-17 and under-21 levels.

In December 2022, Šviderský was first recognised in a Slovak senior national team nomination and was immediately shortlisted in it by Francesco Calzona, who joined the side in late summer, for prospective players' training camp at NTC Senec.

== Personal life ==
According to his social media communication on Instagram, Šviderský is a devout Christian.
