= Srđan Babić =

Serbian footballer (born 1996)

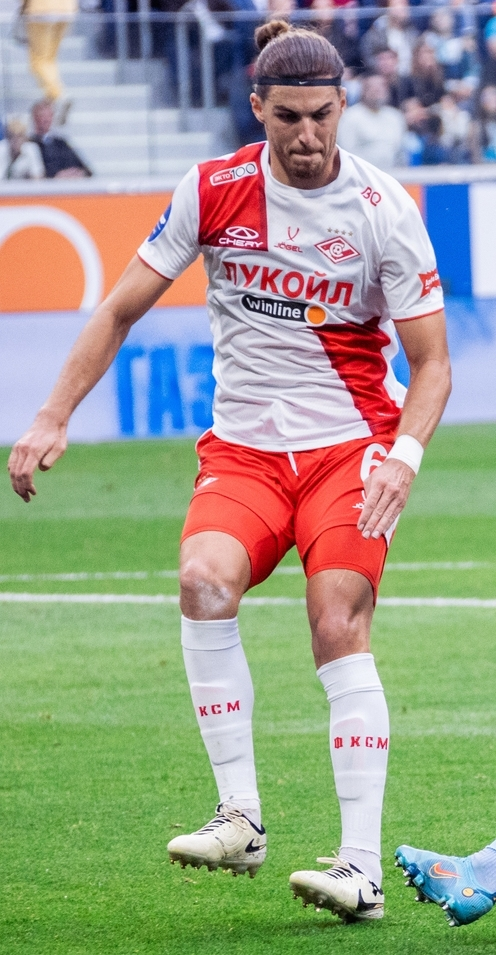
- Babić with Spartak Moscow in 2024

Personal information
- Full name: Srđan Babić
- Date of birth: 22 April 1996 (age 30)
- Place of birth: Banja Luka, Bosnia and Herzegovina
- Height: 1.95 m (6 ft 5 in)
- Position: Centre-back

Team information
- Current team: Spartak Moscow
- Number: 6

Youth career
- –2011: Borac Banja Luka
- 2011–2014: Vojvodina

Senior career*
Years	Team	Apps	(Gls)
2014–2015	Vojvodina	32	(0)
2015–2017	Real Sociedad B	31	(3)
2016–2017	→ Reus (loan)	11	(1)
2017–2021	Red Star Belgrade	60	(7)
2020–2021	→ Famalicão (loan)	27	(1)
2021–2023	Almería	72	(4)
2023–	Spartak Moscow	65	(3)

International career^{‡}
2012	Serbia U17 (Note: Only official UEFA matches included)	6	(1)
2013–2015	Serbia U19	14	(2)
2014–2015	Serbia U20	10	(0)
2015–2019	Serbia U21	6	(1)
2022–	Serbia	15	(2)
Medal record
Gold medal – first place	FIFA U-20 World Cup	2015
- * Club domestic league appearances and goals as of 22 November 2026 ‡ National team caps and goals as of 16 November 2026

Srđan Babić (Serbian Cyrillic: Срђан Бабић; born 22 April 1996) is a professional footballer who plays as a defender for Russian Premier League club Spartak Moscow. Born in Bosnia and Herzegovina, he plays for the Serbia national team.

== Club career ==
=== Vojvodina ===
Babić started out at his hometown club Borac Banja Luka, before joining the youth system of Vojvodina in August 2011. He made his first team debut under manager Branko Babić on 1 March 2014, playing the full 90 minutes in a 2–0 home win over Voždovac. Despite making only eight league appearances in the 2013–14 season, Babić was named in the competition's best eleven. He also helped his team win the Serbian Cup, scoring a goal in a 2–0 victory over Jagodina in the final. In the 2014–15 season, Babić was a regular choice at centre-back, making 27 appearances in all competitions.

=== Real Sociedad ===
On 8 July 2015, Babić signed a four-year contract with Spanish side Real Sociedad, being assigned to the reserves in Segunda División B. He was an undisputed starter during the 2015–16 campaign, making 31 appearances and scoring three goals.

==== Reus (loan) ====
On 31 August 2016, Babić was loaned to Segunda División club Reus Deportiu, on a season-long loan. A backup option to Pichu Atienza and Jesús Olmo, he featured in eleven matches, and also scored his first professional goal while at the club, netting his team's only in a 1–2 home loss against Córdoba on 4 December.

=== Red Star Belgrade ===
On 7 July 2017, Babić made a one-year loan deal with Serbian SuperLiga club Red Star Belgrade. In the mid-season of the 2017–18 campaign, Red Star purchased his contract and Babić signed with the club permanently for a fee of €800,000. On 9 February 2018, Babić signed a new four-year contract with Red Star Belgrade. Babić scored his first goal for Red Star in 5–2 away victory over Mladost Lučani on 1 April 2018, on Slavoljub Srnić's assist from corner kick. On 12 August 2018, Babić scored in 3–0 home win against Spartak Subotica.

=== Almería ===
On 30 August 2021, Babić returned to Spain after agreeing to a one-year loan deal with UD Almería in the second division. The following 5 June, after contributing with the club's promotion to La Liga as champions, he signed a permanent contract until 2026.

=== Spartak Moscow ===
On 21 August 2023, Babić signed a three-year contract with Russian Premier League club Spartak Moscow. On 3 June 2025, he extended his contract to June 2027. In October 2025, he suffered an ACL injury and missed most of the 2025–26 season.

== International career ==
Babić represented Serbia at the 2014 UEFA Under-19 Championship, as the team was eliminated in the semi-final by Portugal. He was also a regular member of the team that won the 2015 FIFA U-20 World Cup.

Babić made his senior debut for Serbia in a September 2022 Nations League game against Sweden. and in November 2022, he was selected in Serbia's squad for the 2022 FIFA World Cup in Qatar. He played in a group stage match against Cameroon, coming on as a sub in 78th minute, replacing Miloš Veljković.

Babić was selected in Serbia's squad for the UEFA Euro 2024, but didn't make any appearances in the tournament.

== Career statistics ==
=== Club ===
As of match played 22 November 2026

Appearances and goals by club, season and competition
Club	Season	League			Cup		Continental		Other		Total	
Club	Season	Apps	Goals	Apps	Goals	Apps	Goals	Apps	Goals	Apps	Goals	Apps
Vojvodina	2013–14	Serbian SuperLiga	8	0	3	1	0	0	—		11	1
Vojvodina	2014–15	Serbian SuperLiga	24	0	2	0	1	0	—		27	0
Vojvodina	Total		32	0	5	1	1	0	0	0	38	1
Real Sociedad B	2015–16	Segunda División B	31	3	—		—		—		31	3
Reus (loan)	2016–17	Segunda División	11	1	1	0	—		—		12	1
Red Star Belgrade	2017–18 (Note: Babić spent the first half-season as a loaned player making 14 league, 1 cup and 3 continental appearances, after which he joined the club permanently)	Serbian SuperLiga	25	1	2	0	3	0	—		30	1
Red Star Belgrade	2018–19	Serbian SuperLiga	21	3	5	0	6	0	—		32	3
Red Star Belgrade	2019–20	Serbian SuperLiga	11	3	2	0	4	0	—		17	3
Red Star Belgrade	2021–22	Serbian SuperLiga	3	0	0	0	0	0	—		3	0
Red Star Belgrade	Total		60	7	9	0	13	0	0	0	82	7
Famalicão (loan)	2020–21	Primeira Liga	27	1	2	0	—		—		29	1
Almería	2021–22	La Liga	37	1	3	0	—		—		40	1
Almería	2022–23	La Liga	34	3	0	0	—		—		34	3
Almería	2023–24	La Liga	1	0	0	0	—		—		1	0
Almería	Total		72	4	3	0	0	0	0	0	75	4
Spartak Moscow	2023–24	Russian Premier League	17	1	6	2	—		—		23	3
Spartak Moscow	2024–25	Russian Premier League	26	2	6	0	—		—		32	2
Spartak Moscow	2025–26	Russian Premier League	10	0	3	0	—		—		13	0
Spartak Moscow	2026–27	Russian Premier League	12	0	1	0	—		1 (Note: Appearance in Russian Super Cup)	0	14	0
Spartak Moscow	Total		65	3	16	2	0	0	1	0	82	5
Career total			298	19	36	3	14	0	1	0	349	22

=== International ===
As of 16 November 2026

Appearances and goals by national team and year
National team	Year	Apps	Goals
Serbia	2022	3	0
Serbia	2023	4	1
Serbia	2024	2	0
Serbia	2025	1	0
Serbia	2026	5	1
Total		15	2

Scores and results list Serbia's goal tally first, score column indicates score after each Babić goal.

List of international goals scored by Srđan Babić
No.	Date	Venue	Cap	Opponent	Score	Result	Competition
1	19 November 2023	Dubočica Stadium, Leskovac, Serbia	7	Bulgaria	2–2	2–2	UEFA Euro 2024 qualifying
2	13 November 2026	Rajko Mitić Stadium, Belgrade, Serbia	14	Germany	1–3	1–3	2026–27 UEFA Nations League A

== Honours ==
Vojvodina

- Serbian Cup: 2013–14

Red Star Belgrade

- Serbian SuperLiga: 2017–18, 2018–19, 2019–20, 2021–22

Almería

- Segunda División: 2021–22

Spartak Moscow

- Russian Cup: 2025–26

Serbia

- FIFA U-20 World Cup New Zealand: 2015

Individual

- Serbian SuperLiga Team of the Season: 2013–14

Orders

- Medal of Merit (Republika Srpska)
