= Carlos Gilbert =

Spanish footballer

Personal information
- Full name: Carlos Gilbert Herrera
- Date of birth: 16 April 1999 (age 27)
- Place of birth: Barcelona, Spain
- Position: Forward

Team information
- Current team: Ibiza Islas Pitiusas
- Number: 11

Youth career
- Santfeliuenc
- 2008–2009: Cornellà
- 2009–2010: Barcelona
- 2010–2014: Cornellà
- 2014–2018: Espanyol

Senior career*
Years	Team	Apps	(Gls)
2018–2019	Espanyol B	0	(0)
2018–2019	→ Horta (loan)	17	(3)
2019	→ Cornellà (loan)	2	(0)
2019–2021	Mallorca B	23	(11)
2020–2021	→ Peña Deportiva (loan)	18	(0)
2021–2023	Almería B	58	(19)
2022	Almería	1	(0)
2023–2024	Manresa	33	(2)
2024–2025	Europa	16	(2)
2025	Olot	15	(2)
2025–	Ibiza Islas Pitiusas	33	(5)
- * Club domestic league appearances and goals as of 15 May 2026

Carlos Gilbert Herrera (born 16 April 1999) is a Spanish professional footballer who plays as a forward for Segunda Federación club Ibiza Islas Pitiusas.

== Club career ==
Gilbert was born in Barcelona, Catalonia, and represented Santfeliuenc FC, UE Cornellà, FC Barcelona and RCD Espanyol as a youth. In August 2018, after finishing his formation, he was loaned to Tercera División side UA Horta for the season.

Gilbert made his senior debut on 18 August 2018, coming on as a second-half substitute for Ferran Tacón and scoring a brace in a 3–1 home win over UE Figueres. The following 31 January, he moved to another club he represented as a youth, Cornellà, also in a temporary deal.

In July 2019, Gilbert moved to RCD Mallorca and was assigned to the reserves also in the fourth division. On 3 October of the following year, he renewed his contract and was loaned to Segunda División B side SCR Peña Deportiva, for one year.

On 24 August 2021, Gilbert signed for another reserve team, UD Almería B in Tercera División RFEF. He made his first team debut the following 2 January, replacing Javi Robles in a 0–1 home loss against FC Cartagena in the Segunda División championship.
