= Marcos Peña (footballer) =

Spanish footballer (born 2005)

Personal information
- Full name: Marcos Peña Ocaña
- Date of birth: 22 January 2005 (age 21)
- Place of birth: Almería, Spain
- Height: 1.80 m (5 ft 11 in)
- Position: Midfielder

Team information
- Current team: Famalicão
- Number: 8

Youth career
- 2009–2017: Pavía
- 2013–2014: → Loma de Acosta (loan)
- 2017–2019: Málaga
- 2019–2020: San Félix
- 2020–2023: Almería

Senior career*
Years	Team	Apps	(Gls)
2023–2024	Almería B	23	(2)
2024–2025	Almería	7	(0)
2024–2025	→ Marbella (loan)	34	(1)
2025–	Famalicão	16	(0)
- * Club domestic league appearances and goals as of 25 May 2026

Marcos Peña Ocaña (born 22 January 2005) is a Spanish professional footballer who plays as a midfielder for Primeira Liga club Famalicão.

== Career ==
Born in Almería, Andalusia, Peña began his career with hometown side UD Pavía at the age of four, before moving to the youth sides of Málaga CF in 2017. In 2020, he moved to UD Almería, and was a captain of the Juvenil squad which reached the Copa del Rey Juvenil de Fútbol final in 2023.

Promoted to the reserves ahead of the 2023–24 season, Peña made his senior debut on 10 September 2023, starting in a 0–0 Tercera Federación away draw against Atlético Malagueño. He scored his first goal fourteen days later, netting the opener in a 1–1 draw at UD Ciudad de Torredonjimeno.

Peña made his first team – and La Liga – debut on 17 March 2024, starting in a 1–0 away win over UD Las Palmas, which was the club's first league win of the campaign. On 30 August, he was loaned to Primera Federación side Marbella FC for the season.

On 1 August 2025, Peña moved abroad for the first time in his career, signing a four-year contract with Primeira Liga side Famalicão.
