= Arnau Puigmal =

Spanish footballer

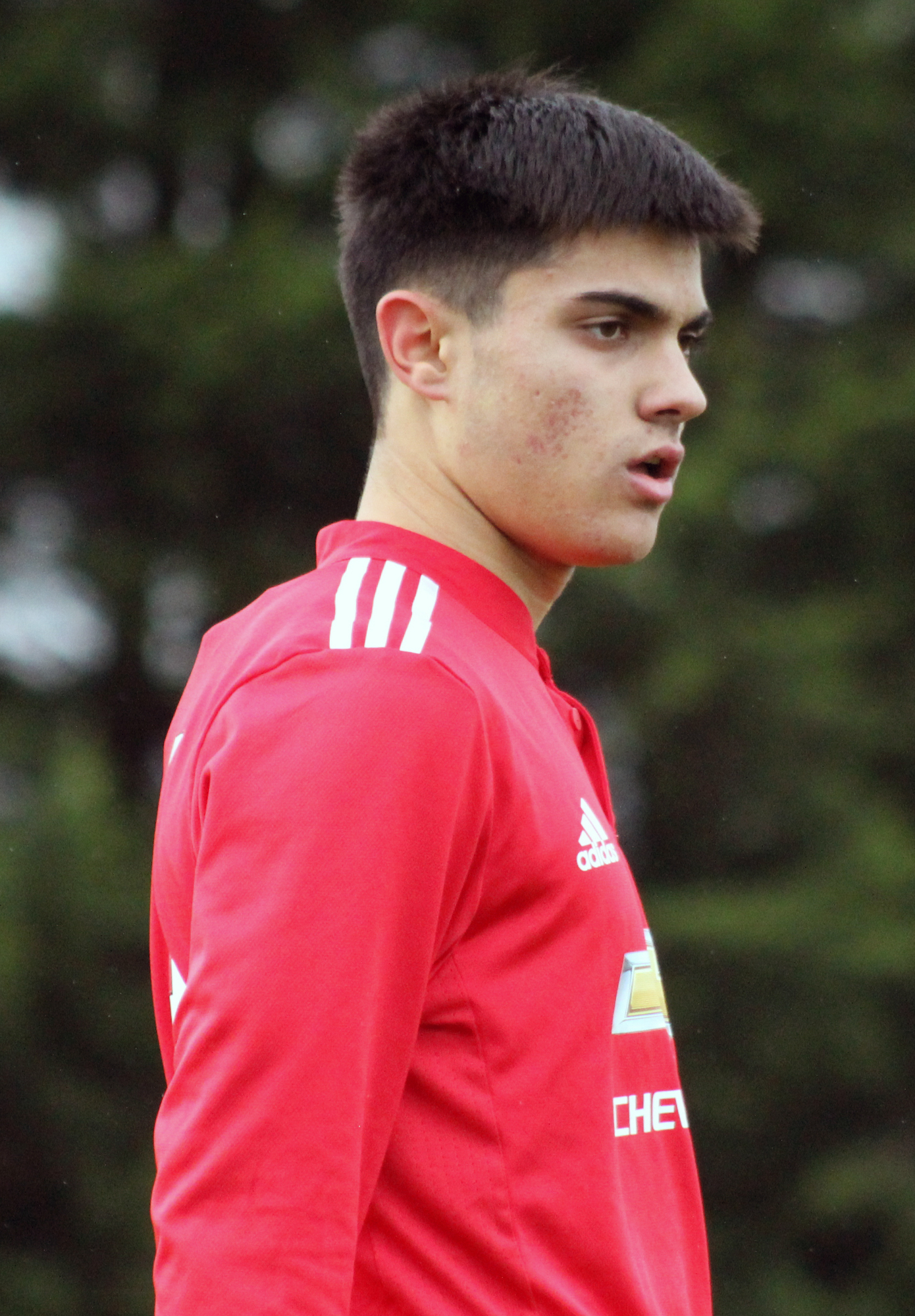
- Puigmal in 2017

Personal information
- Full name: Arnau Puigmal Martínez
- Date of birth: 10 January 2001 (age 25)
- Place of birth: Barcelona, Spain
- Height: 1.74 m (5 ft 9 in)
- Position: Midfielder

Team information
- Current team: Mallorca
- Number: 17

Youth career
- PB Sant Cugat
- 2010–2017: Espanyol
- 2017–2021: Manchester United

Senior career*
Years	Team	Apps	(Gls)
2019–2021	Manchester United	0	(0)
2021–2026	Almería	146	(12)
2024	→ Elche (loan)	13	(0)
2026–	Mallorca	5	(0)

International career
2017–2018	Spain U17	6	(1)
2019	Spain U18	4	(1)
2019–2020	Spain U19	3	(0)
- * Club domestic league appearances and goals as of 4 October 2026

Arnau Puigmal Martínez (Catalan pronunciation: [pudʒˈmal]; born 10 January 2001) is a Spanish footballer who plays for Mallorca. Mainly a midfielder, he can also play as a right-back or a right winger.

== Club career ==
=== Early career ===
Born in Barcelona, Catalonia, Puigmal joined Espanyol's youth setup in 2010, from Penya Blaugrana Sant Cugat del Vallès. In May 2017, after impressing with the Cadet A squad, he signed a contract with Manchester United.

=== Manchester United ===
Puigmal arrived at United in the 2017 summer, and played for the under-18s before signing his first professional contract on 12 January 2018. He was promoted to the under-23s in 2019, and played his first senior match with the side on 1 October of that year, as he started as a right back in a 1–0 away win over Lincoln City, for the season's EFL Trophy.

Puigmal scored his first senior goal on 9 September 2020, netting the second in a 6–0 away success over Salford City. The following 4 June, he was one of the eight players released by the club as his contract was due to expire.

=== Almería ===
On 9 July 2021, free agent Puigmal signed a five-year contract with Segunda División side Almería. He made his professional debut on 16 August, coming on as a late substitute for goalscorer Largie Ramazani in a 3–1 away win over Cartagena.

During a match against Mallorca in the 2022–23 La Liga season, Puigmal shoved opponent Lee Kang-in to the ground for dribbling the ball to the corner flag. Puigmal then grabbed Lee's head while on the ground and shoved him multiple times. Puigmal was given a yellow card for his aggressive behavior.

==== Loan to Elche ====
On 31 January 2024, Puigmal was loaned to Elche in the second division until the end of the campaign, with a buyout clause.

==== Return from loan ====
Back to the Rojiblancos in July 2024, Puigmal continued to feature regularly, but mainly as a substitute. On 6 July 2026, the club announced his departure after his contract expired.

=== Mallorca ===
On 7 July 2026, Puigmal agreed to a three-year deal with Mallorca in the second division.

== International career ==
Puigmal represented Spain at under-17, under-18 and under-19 levels.

== Career statistics ==
=== Club ===
As of match played 4 October 2026

Appearances and goals by club, season and competition
Club	Season	League			Cup		Other		Total	
Club	Season	Division	Apps	Goals	Apps	Goals	Apps	Goals	Apps	Goals
Manchester United U23	2019–20	Premier League 2	14	3	—		2 (Note: Appearance(s) in EFL Trophy)	0	16	3
Manchester United U23	2020–21	Premier League 2	9	6	—		3	1	12	7
Manchester United U23	Total		23	9	0	0	5	1	28	10
Almería	2021–22	Segunda División	33	5	1	0	—		34	5
Almería	2022–23	La Liga	22	1	1	0	—		23	1
Almería	2023–24	La Liga	11	0	2	0	—		13	0
Almería	2024–25	Segunda División	39	3	4	2	2 (Note: Aooearances in La Liga play-offs)	0	45	5
Almería	2025–26	Segunda División	41	3	2	0	4	0	47	3
Almería	Total		146	12	10	2	6	0	162	14
Elche (loan)	2023–24	Segunda División	13	0	—		—		13	0
Mallorca	2026–27	Segunda División	5	0	—		—		5	0
Career total			187	21	10	2	11	1	208	24

== Honours ==
Almería

- Segunda División: 2021–22
