= Sergio Arribas (footballer, born 2001) =

Spanish footballer

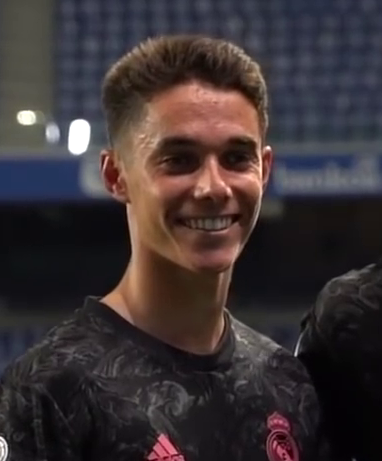
- Arribas in 2020

Personal information
- Full name: Sergio Arribas Calvo
- Date of birth: 30 September 2001 (age 25)
- Place of birth: Madrid, Spain
- Height: 1.72 m (5 ft 7 1/2 in)
- Position: Attacking midfielder

Team information
- Current team: Almería
- Number: 11

Youth career
- 2007–2010: Pérez Galdós
- 2010–2012: Leganés
- 2012–2020: Real Madrid

Senior career*
Years	Team	Apps	(Gls)
2020–2023	Real Madrid B	89	(38)
2020–2023	Real Madrid	10	(0)
2023–	Almería	121	(42)
- * Club domestic league appearances and goals as of 27 September 2026

Sergio Arribas Calvo (born 30 September 2001) is a Spanish professional footballer who plays as an attacking midfielder for Segunda División club Almería.

== Club career ==
=== Real Madrid ===
Born in Madrid, Arribas joined Real Madrid's La Fábrica in 2012, after representing CD Leganés and CDE Benito Pérez Galdós. In September 2020, after helping the under-20s win the UEFA Youth League, he was promoted to the reserves in Segunda División B.

Arribas made his first team – and La Liga – debut on 20 September 2020, coming on as a late substitute for Vinícius Júnior in a 0–0 away draw against Real Sociedad. His Champions League debut came on 9 December 2020 as a substitute, in a 2–0 victory over Borussia Mönchengladbach. He scored his first goal for the first team on 8 February 2023, in a 4–1 win against Al Ahly in the 2022 FIFA Club World Cup.

=== Almería ===
On 9 August 2023, Arribas signed a six-year contract with Almería in the top tier. He scored his first goal in the top tier ten days later, netting the opener in a 3–1 home defeat to his former club, Real Madrid.

== Club statistics ==
As of 27 September 2026

Appearances and goals by club, season and competition
Club	Season	League			Copa del Rey		Other		Total	
Club	Season	Division	Apps	Goals	Apps	Goals	Apps	Goals	Apps	Goals
Real Madrid Castilla	2020–21	Segunda División B	19	5	—		1 (Note: Appearance in Segunda División B play-offs)	0	20	5
Real Madrid Castilla	2021–22	Primera División RFEF	36	15	—		—		36	15
Real Madrid Castilla	2022–23	Primera Federación	34	18	—		3 (Note: Appearance in Primera Federación play-offs)	3	37	21
Real Madrid Castilla	Total		89	38	—		4	3	93	41
Real Madrid	2020–21	La Liga	8	0	0	0	2 (Note: Appearances in UEFA Champions League)	0	10	0
Real Madrid	2022–23	La Liga	2	0	1	0	1 (Note: Appearance in FIFA Club World Cup)	1	4	1
Real Madrid	Total		10	0	1	0	3	1	14	1
Almería	2023–24	La Liga	34	9	2	0	–		36	9
Almería	2024–25	Segunda División	41	8	3	0	2 (Note: Appearances in La Liga play-offs)	1	46	9
Almería	2025–26	Segunda División	42	25	1	0	4	1	47	26
Almería	2026–27	Segunda División	4	0	0	0	–		4	0
Almería	Total		121	42	6	0	6	2	133	44
Career total			220	80	7	0	13	6	240	86

== Honours ==
=== Real Madrid Juvenil A ===
- UEFA Youth League: 2019–20

Real Madrid

- Copa del Rey: 2022–23
- FIFA Club World Cup: 2022
