= Nélson Monte =

Portuguese footballer

Personal information
- Full name: Nélson Macedo Monte
- Date of birth: 30 July 1995 (age 31)
- Place of birth: Vila do Conde, Portugal
- Height: 1.87 m (6 ft 2 in)
- Position: Defender

Team information
- Current team: Córdoba (on loan from Almería)

Youth career
- 2004–2008: Futsal
- 2008–2012: Benfica
- 2012–2014: Rio Ave

Senior career*
Years	Team	Apps	(Gls)
2014−2021	Rio Ave	103	(0)
2021−2023	Dnipro-1	8	(0)
2022	→ Almería (loan)	0	(0)
2022−2023	→ Chaves (loan)	31	(0)
2023−2025	Málaga	65	(3)
2025−	Almería	28	(0)
2026−	→ Córdoba (loan)	0	(0)

International career
2013−2014	Portugal U19	13	(0)
2015	Portugal U20	3	(0)
- * Club domestic league appearances and goals as of 07:00, 5 June 2026 (UTC)

Nélson Macedo Monte (born 30 July 1995) is a Portuguese professional footballer who plays as a right-back or a central defender for Segunda División club Córdoba, on loan from Almería.

Brought up at Rio Ave, he made 134 Primeira Liga appearances for that club as well as Chaves, in addition to spells in Ukraine and Spain.

== Club career ==
=== Rio Ave ===
Born in Vila do Conde, Monte joined local Rio Ave FC's youth system in 2012, signing from S.L. Benfica to finish his development. On 30 January 2014, he and Silvério agreed to five-year professional contracts.

On 12 April 2014, while still a junior, Monte made his professional − and Primeira Liga − debut, playing the full 90 minutes in a 1−2 home loss against S.C. Olhanense. On 21 August the following year, he was sent off in a 1–0 win over S.C. Braga also at the Estádio dos Arcos.

Monte was in advanced negotiations with FC Porto in early February 2016, but the two clubs did not agree terms. In 2017–18, after the losses of Roderick Miranda and Marcelo to the back line, he played the majority of games for the first time; the following season ended for him in March due to surgery on his left ankle.

On 1 October 2020, Monte missed in a penalty shootout at home to AC Milan in the play-off round of the UEFA Europa League; his attempt would have won the game had it gone in, but the Italians won 9–8.

Monte cut ties with Rio Ave in September 2021, having totalled 139 appearances without scoring.

=== Dnipro ===
Shortly after leaving, Monte joined SC Dnipro-1 in the Ukrainian Premier League on a two-year deal. On 24 February 2022, after the Russian invasion of Ukraine, he was evacuated from the city of Dnipro; he drove into Romania and took a flight back to his home country.

On 7 March 2022, FIFA suspended the contracts of all foreign players and coaches affiliated with the Ukrainian Association of Football until 30 June, with the former being allowed to sign a contract with clubs in other countries until that date. Eight days later, Monte used that regulation to sign with UD Almería of the Spanish Segunda División until the end of the season. The Andalusian side won promotion as champions, though he was completely unused.

Monte returned to his country's top flight on 5 July 2022, signing for a year at newly promoted G.D. Chaves.

=== Málaga ===
On 23 August 2023, Monte went back to Spain, signing for Málaga CF in the Primera Federación. He helped to second-tier promotion in his first season, contributing 36 appearances in all competitions.

Monte scored three goals in the 2024–25 campaign, his first as a professional. The first arrived on 20 September 2024, when he closed the 2–2 away draw against Granada CF in injury time.

=== Almería return ===
On 21 July 2025, Monte returned to Almería on a three-year contract. On 1 September of the following year, however, he was loaned to fellow second division side Córdoba CF for the season.

== International career ==
Monte earned 13 caps for Portugal at under-19 level, starting with a 1–1 draw with Spain in Budapest on 10 October 2013. He played three under-20 matches in 2015, including a group finale victory over Colombia on their way to the quarter-finals of the FIFA World Cup in New Zealand.

== Career statistics ==
As of 15 June 2024

Club	Season	League			National cup (Note: Includes Taça de Portugal, Taça da Liga, Ukrainian Cup, Copa del Rey)		Continental		Other		Total	
Club	Season	Division	Apps	Goals	Apps	Goals	Apps	Goals	Apps	Goals	Apps	Goals
Rio Ave	2013–14	Primeira Liga	1	0	—		—		—		1	0
Rio Ave	2014–15	Primeira Liga	6	0	6	0	—		—		12	0
Rio Ave	2015–16	Primeira Liga	12	0	5	0	—		—		17	0
Rio Ave	2016–17	Primeira Liga	9	0	3	0	—		—		12	0
Rio Ave	2017–18	Primeira Liga	26	0	7	0	—		—		33	0
Rio Ave	2018–19	Primeira Liga	13	0	3	0	2 (Note: Appearances in UEFA Europa League)	0	—		18	0
Rio Ave	2019–20	Primeira Liga	20	0	5	0	—		—		25	0
Rio Ave	2020–21	Primeira Liga	16	0	2	0	1	0	2 (Note: Appearances in Primeira Liga relegation play-offs)	0	21	0
Rio Ave	2021–22	Liga Portugal 2	0	0	—		—		0	0	0	0
Rio Ave	Total		103	0	31	0	3	0	2	0	139	0
Dnipro-1	2021–22	Ukrainian Premier League	8	0	1	0	—		—		9	0
Dnipro-1	2023–24	Ukrainian Premier League	0	0	—		—		0	0	0	0
Dnipro-1	Total		8	0	1	0	—		0	0	9	0
Almería (loan)	2021–22	Segunda División	0	0	—		—		—		0	0
Chaves (loan)	2022–23	Primeira Liga	31	0	2	0	—		—		33	0
Málaga	2023–24	Primera Federación	32	0	1	0	—		3 (Note: Appearances in Primera Federación promotion play-offs)	0	36	0
Career Total			174	0	35	0	3	0	5	0	217	0
