= Javi Robles =

Spanish footballer

Personal information
- Full name: José Javier Robles Belmonte
- Date of birth: 3 October 2000 (age 26)
- Place of birth: Almería, Spain
- Height: 1.86 m (6 ft 1 in)
- Position: Midfielder

Team information
- Current team: SS Reyes
- Number: 14

Youth career
- 2005–2008: Natación Almería
- 2008–2010: Pavía
- 2010–2015: Almería
- 2015–2017: Real Madrid
- 2017–2019: Almería

Senior career*
Years	Team	Apps	(Gls)
2019–2021	Almería B	47	(6)
2021–2023	Almería	10	(0)
2022–2023	→ Fuenlabrada (loan)	15	(0)
2023	Pontevedra	10	(0)
2023–2024	Lleida Esportiu	14	(0)
2024–2025	Illescas	25	(0)
2025–	SS Reyes	26	(0)
- * Club domestic league appearances and goals as of 16 May 2026

José Javier "Javi" Robles Belmonte (born 3 October 2000) is a Spanish footballer who plays as a central midfielder for Segunda Federación club SS Reyes.

== Club career ==
Born in Almería, Andalusia, Robles joined Real Madrid's La Fábrica in 2015, from UD Almería. He returned to his previous club in 2017, and made his senior debut with the reserves on 12 May 2019, starting and being sent off in a 0–2 Segunda División B away loss against CD El Ejido.

Robles scored his first senior goal on 1 November 2019, netting the equalizer in a 1–1 home draw against CD Huétor Tájar in the Tercera División. He made his first-team debut on 16 August 2021, coming on as a late substitute for Lucas Robertone in a 3–1 Segunda División away win against FC Cartagena.

On 17 July 2022, Robles was loaned to Primera División RFEF side CF Fuenlabrada for the season. The following 31 January, his loan was cut short; he subsequently terminated his link with the Rojiblancos and signed for Pontevedra CF also in the third division.

== Honours ==
Almería

- Segunda División: 2021–22
