= Fernando Martínez (Spanish footballer) =

Spanish footballer

Fernando
Personal information
- Full name: Fernando Martínez Rubio
- Date of birth: 10 June 1990 (age 36)
- Place of birth: Murcia, Spain
- Height: 1.85 m (6 ft 1 in)
- Position: Goalkeeper

Team information
- Current team: Almería
- Number: 13

Youth career
- Valencia

Senior career*
Years	Team	Apps	(Gls)
2009–2010	Sangonera	4	(0)
2010–2012	Murcia B	66	(0)
2012–2016	Murcia	59	(0)
2012	→ UCAM Murcia (loan)	10	(0)
2016–2017	UCAM Murcia	12	(0)
2017–	Almería	136	(0)

International career
2008	Spain U19	2	(0)
- * Club domestic league appearances and goals as of 28 November 2025

Fernando Martínez Rubio (born 10 June 1990), known simply as Fernando, is a Spanish professional footballer who plays as a goalkeeper for, and captains, Segunda División club Almería.

== Club career ==
=== Early career ===
Born in Murcia, Fernando finished his development in Valencia CF's youth system. He made his senior debut with Sangonera Atlético CF, spending one season in the Segunda División B.

=== Murcia ===
Fernando joined Real Murcia CF in the summer of 2010, playing two years with the reserves in the Tercera División. In August 2012, he was loaned to neighbouring UCAM Murcia CF in the third division.

Fernando made his official debut for Murcia on 11 September 2013, in a 2–0 away loss against Hércules CF in the second round of the Copa del Rey. His Segunda División bow occurred on 24 November, as he replaced field player Daniel Toribio after Casto was sent off in the 70th minute, and kept a clean sheet in the 0–0 draw at AD Alcorcón.

=== UCAM Murcia ===
On 5 July 2016, Fernando returned to UCAM Murcia, newly promoted to the second tier. A backup to Biel Ribas, he featured in 12 league matches as his team suffered relegation.

=== Almería ===
On 5 July 2017, Fernando signed a two-year contract with fellow second-division club UD Almería. Second-choice to René, he renewed his contract with the Rojiblancos for a further two seasons on 22 May 2019.

Fernando became a regular starter under new manager Guti, and agreed to a further extension until 2022 on 27 April 2020. He only missed one game in 42 in the 2021–22 campaign, and Almería returned to La Liga after seven years as champions; in the process, he was awarded the Ricardo Zamora Trophy.

Fernando made his Spanish top-flight debut on 14 August 2022 at the age of 32, in a 2–1 home loss to Real Madrid. The following 19 January, he again renewed his link with the Andalusians, now until 2025.

On 2 July 2025, having spent the better part of two seasons as backup to Luís Maximiano, Fernando agreed to a one-year extension.

== Career statistics ==
As of match played 11 June 2025

Appearances and goals by club, season and competition
Club	Season	League			National cup		Continental		Other		Total	
Club	Season	Division	Apps	Goals	Apps	Goals	Apps	Goals	Apps	Goals	Apps	Goals
Sangonera	2009–10	Segunda División B	4	0	—		—		—		4	0
Murcia	2010–11	Segunda División B	0	0	0	0	—		0	0	0	0
Murcia	2011–12	Segunda División	0	0	0	0	—		—		0	0
Murcia	2013–14	Segunda División	2	0	1	0	—		0	0	3	0
Murcia	2014–15	Segunda División B	20	0	0	0	—		0	0	20	0
Murcia	2015–16	Segunda División B	37	0	1	0	—		2 (Note: Appearances in Segunda División B play-offs)	0	40	0
Murcia	Total		59	0	2	0	—		2	0	63	0
UCAM Murcia (loan)	2012–13	Segunda División B	10	0	—		—		—		10	0
UCAM Murcia	2016–17	Segunda División	12	0	2	0	—		—		14	0
Almería	2017–18	Segunda División	0	0	1	0	—		—		1	0
Almería	2018–19	Segunda División	4	0	4	0	—		—		8	0
Almería	2019–20	Segunda División	24	0	0	0	—		0	0	24	0
Almería	2020–21	Segunda División	11	0	3	0	—		1 (Note: Appearances in La Liga play-offs)	0	15	0
Almería	2021–22	Segunda División	41	0	1	0	—		—		42	0
Almería	2022–23	La Liga	37	0	0	0	—		—		37	0
Almería	2023–24	La Liga	4	0	0	0	—		—		4	0
Almería	2024–25	Segunda División	14	0	2	0	—		2	0	18	0
Almería	Total		135	0	11	0	—		3	0	149	0
Career total			220	0	15	0	0	0	5	0	240	0

== Honours ==
Almería

- Segunda División: 2021–22
