= Diamant Ramazani =

Belgian footballer

Personal information
- Date of birth: 18 February 1999 (age 27)
- Place of birth: Berchem-Sainte-Agathe, Belgium
- Height: 1.75 m (5 ft 9 in)
- Position: Right-back

Youth career
- 2003–2007: Lebbeke
- 2007–2011: Anderlecht
- 2011–2014: Lokeren
- 2014–2016: Thamesmead Town
- 2016–2020: Lokeren

Senior career*
Years	Team	Apps	(Gls)
2020	Lokeren	2	(0)
2020–2022	Lokeren-Temse	13	(0)
2022–2023	Almería B	18	(0)

International career^{‡}
2019–	Burundi	7	(0)
- * Club domestic league appearances and goals as of 28 May 2023 ‡ National team caps and goals as of 22:53, 26 February 2023 (UTC)

Diamant Ramazani (born 18 February 1999) is a professional footballer who plays as a right-back. Born in Belgium, he has represented the Burundi national team internationally.

== Club career ==
=== Lokeren ===
On 7 March 2018, Ramazani signed his first professional contract with Lokeren for three years.

=== Almería B ===
On 21 September 2022, he signed a one-year contract with Spanish club Almería B in Tercera Federación.

== International career ==
Ramazani was born in Belgium to Burundian parents. Ramazani debuted for the Burundi national team in a 1-1 2022 FIFA World Cup qualification tie with Tanzania on 4 September 2019.

== Personal life ==
His younger brother Largie Ramazani is also a footballer, a winger who plays for Premier League club Leeds United.
