= Samú Costa =

Portuguese footballer

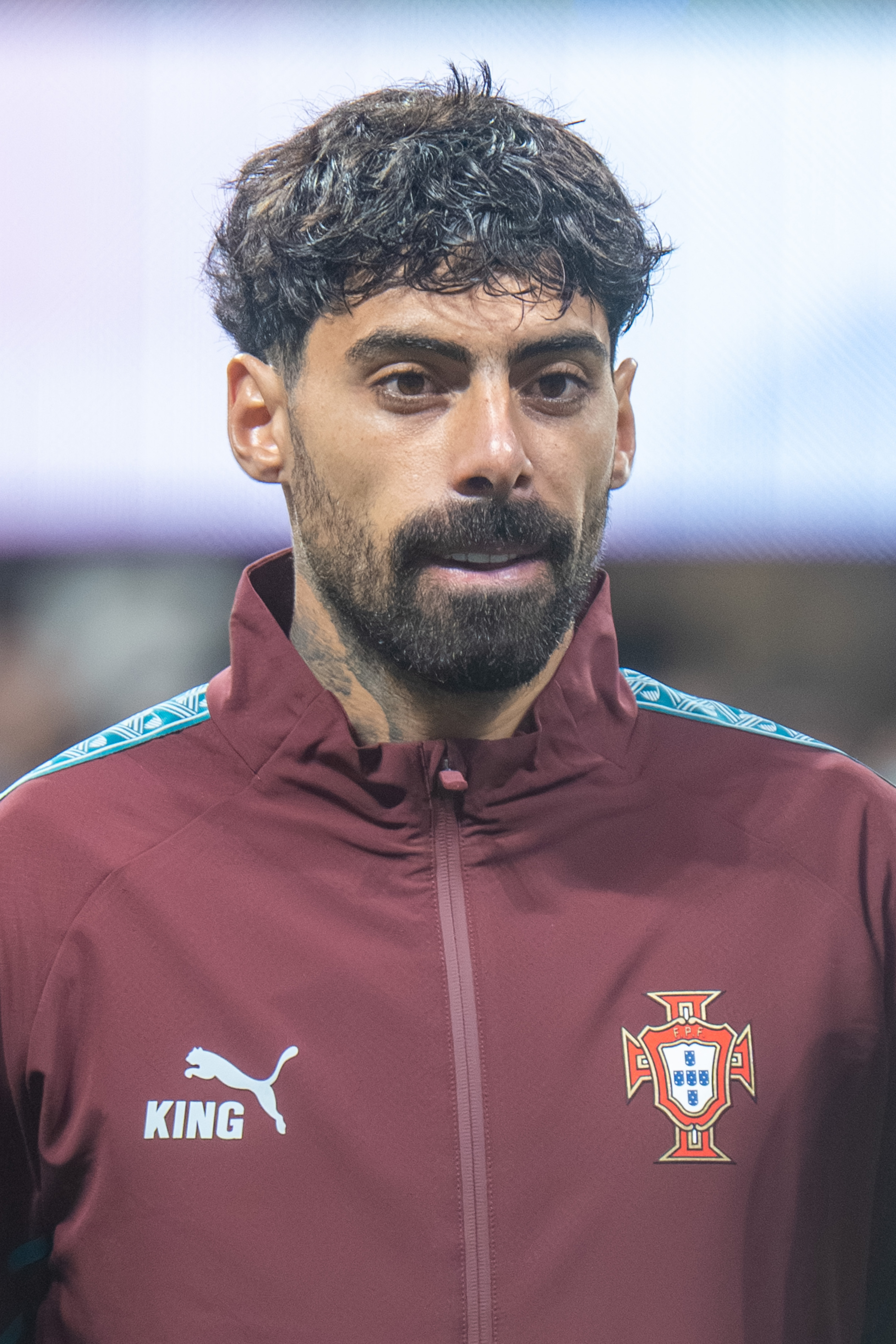
- Samú with Portugal in 2026

Personal information
- Full name: Samuel de Almeida Costa
- Date of birth: 27 November 2000 (age 25)
- Place of birth: Aveiro, Portugal
- Height: 1.85 m (6 ft 1 in)
- Position: Defensive midfielder

Team information
- Current team: Al-Nassr
- Number: 11

Youth career
- 2008–2013: Beira-Mar
- 2013–2015: Gafanha
- 2015–2016: Palmeiras Braga
- 2016–2019: Braga

Senior career*
Years	Team	Apps	(Gls)
2019–2020	Braga B	12	(1)
2020–2021	Braga	1	(0)
2020–2021	→ Almería (loan)	35	(2)
2021–2023	Almería	70	(1)
2023–2026	Mallorca	100	(8)
2026–	Al-Nassr	10	(3)

International career^{‡}
2019	Portugal U19	6	(0)
2019	Portugal U20	6	(1)
2022–2023	Portugal U21	7	(1)
2024–	Portugal	7	(0)
Medal record
Men's football
Representing Portugal
UEFA European Under-19 Championship
Runner-up	Armenia 2019
- * Club domestic league appearances and goals as of 20 November 2026 ‡ National team caps and goals as of 27 June 2026

Samuel "Samú" de Almeida Costa (born 27 November 2000) is a Portuguese professional footballer who plays as a defensive midfielder for Saudi Pro League club Al-Nassr and the Portugal national team.

== Club career ==
=== Braga ===
Born in Aveiro, Costa represented Beira-Mar, Gafanha, Palmeiras FC de Braga and Braga as a youth. He made his Campeonato de Portugal debut for the latter's B-team on 2 November 2019 in a game against Bragança.

On 25 July 2020, Costa played his first match for Braga, coming on as a substitute for Pedro Amador in the 46th minute in a match against Porto.

=== Almería ===
On 10 September 2020, Costa was loaned to Segunda División side UD Almería for the 2020–21 season. He made his debut abroad seventeen days later, starting in a 2–0 away win over CD Lugo.

Costa scored his first professional goal on 24 January 2021, netting the opener in a 2–2 home draw against CE Sabadell FC. On 11 June, after being regularly used, he was bought outright and signed a five-year contract.

Costa helped the Andalusians in their promotion to La Liga as champions, and made his top-tier debut on 14 August 2022, starting in a 2–1 home loss to Real Madrid. On 23 September, he further extended his link until 2029.

=== Mallorca ===
On 10 August 2023, Costa agreed to a five-year contract with RCD Mallorca also in the Spanish first division. He played for the club for three seasons, making 108 appearances and scoring eight goals in all competitions.

=== Al-Nassr ===
On 9 August 2026, Costa joined Saudi Pro League club Al-Nassr on his 1st match against Al-Fateh he scored his first goal in a 3-0 win.

== International career ==
On 12 October 2024, Costa debuted for Portugal national football team in a 2–1 victory against Poland during a UEFA Nations League match, coming as a substitute for Bernardo Silva.

On 19 May 2026, Costa was selected in the 26-man squad for the 2026 FIFA World Cup.

== Career statistics ==
=== Club ===
As of match played 20 October 2026

Appearances and goals by club, season and competition
Club	Season	League			National cup (Note: Includes Copa del Rey, King's Cup)		League cup		Continental		Other		Total	
Club	Season	Division	Apps	Goals	Apps	Goals	Apps	Goals	Apps	Goals	Apps	Goals	Apps	Goals
Braga B	2019–20	Campeonato de Portugal	12	1	—		—		—		—		12	1
Braga	2019–20	Primeira Liga	1	0	0	0	0	0	0	0	—		1	0
Almería (loan)	2020–21	Segunda División	35	2	3	0	—		—		2 (Note: Appearances in Segunda División promotion play-offs)	0	40	2
Almería	2021–22	Segunda División	38	0	2	0	—		—		—		40	0
Almería	2022–23	La Liga	32	1	1	0	—		—		—		33	1
Almería	Total		105	3	6	0	—		—		2	0	113	3
Mallorca	2023–24	La Liga	34	1	5	0	—		—		—		39	1
Mallorca	2024–25	La Liga	32	0	0	0	—		—		1 (Note: Appearance in Supercopa de España)	0	33	0
Mallorca	2025–26	La Liga	34	7	2	0	—		—		—		36	7
Mallorca	Total		100	8	7	0	—		—		1	0	108	8
Al-Nassr	2026–27	Saudi Pro League	8	3	1	0	—		2 (Note: Appearances in AFC Champions League Elite)	0	0	0	11	3
Career total			226	14	14	0	0	0	2	0	3	0	245	14

=== International ===
As of match played 27 June 2026

Appearances and goals by national team and year
National team	Year	Apps	Goals
Portugal	2024	2	0
Portugal	2025	0	0
Portugal	2026	5	0
Total		7	0

== Honours ==
=== Individual ===
- La Liga Goal of the Month: October 2025
