= Raúl Caballero (footballer, born 2001) =

Spanish footballer

Personal information
- Full name: Raúl Caballero Ramírez
- Date of birth: 16 January 2001 (age 25)
- Place of birth: Martos, Spain
- Height: 1.76 m (5 ft 9 in)
- Position: Forward

Team information
- Current team: Torrent
- Number: 9

Youth career
- 2014–2017: Jaén
- 2017–2019: Córdoba
- 2019–2020: Almería

Senior career*
Years	Team	Apps	(Gls)
2019	Córdoba B	1	(0)
2019–2022	Almería B	53	(13)
2021–2022	Almería	3	(0)
2022–2023	San Fernando	4	(1)
2023–2024	Estepona	27	(2)
2024	Numancia	12	(0)
2024–2025	Conquense	34	(6)
2025–	Torrent	33	(13)
- * Club domestic league appearances and goals as of 15 May 2026

Raúl Caballero Ramírez (born 16 January 2001) is a Spanish footballer who plays as a forward for Segunda Federación club Torrent.

== Club career ==
Born in Martos, Jaén, Andalusia, Caballero joined Córdoba CF's youth setup in 2017, from hometown side Real Jaén. He made his debut with the former's reserves on 7 January 2019, coming on as a second-half substitute in a 1–2 Tercera División home loss against Écija Balompié.

In the 2019 summer, Caballero moved to UD Almería and returned to the youth setup. He scored his first senior goal with the B-side on 22 November 2020, netting the third of a 4–0 home routing of Loja CD.

Caballero scored ten times for the B's during the 2020–21 season, and spent the 2021 pre-season with the main squad. He made his professional debut on 29 August, replacing Largie Ramazani late into a 1–2 away loss against SD Amorebieta in the Segunda División.

== Personal life ==
Caballero's older brother Antonio is also a footballer. A midfielder, he made his debut with Martos CD.

== Honours ==
Almería

- Segunda División: 2021–22
