= Umar Sadiq =

Nigerian footballer (born 1997)

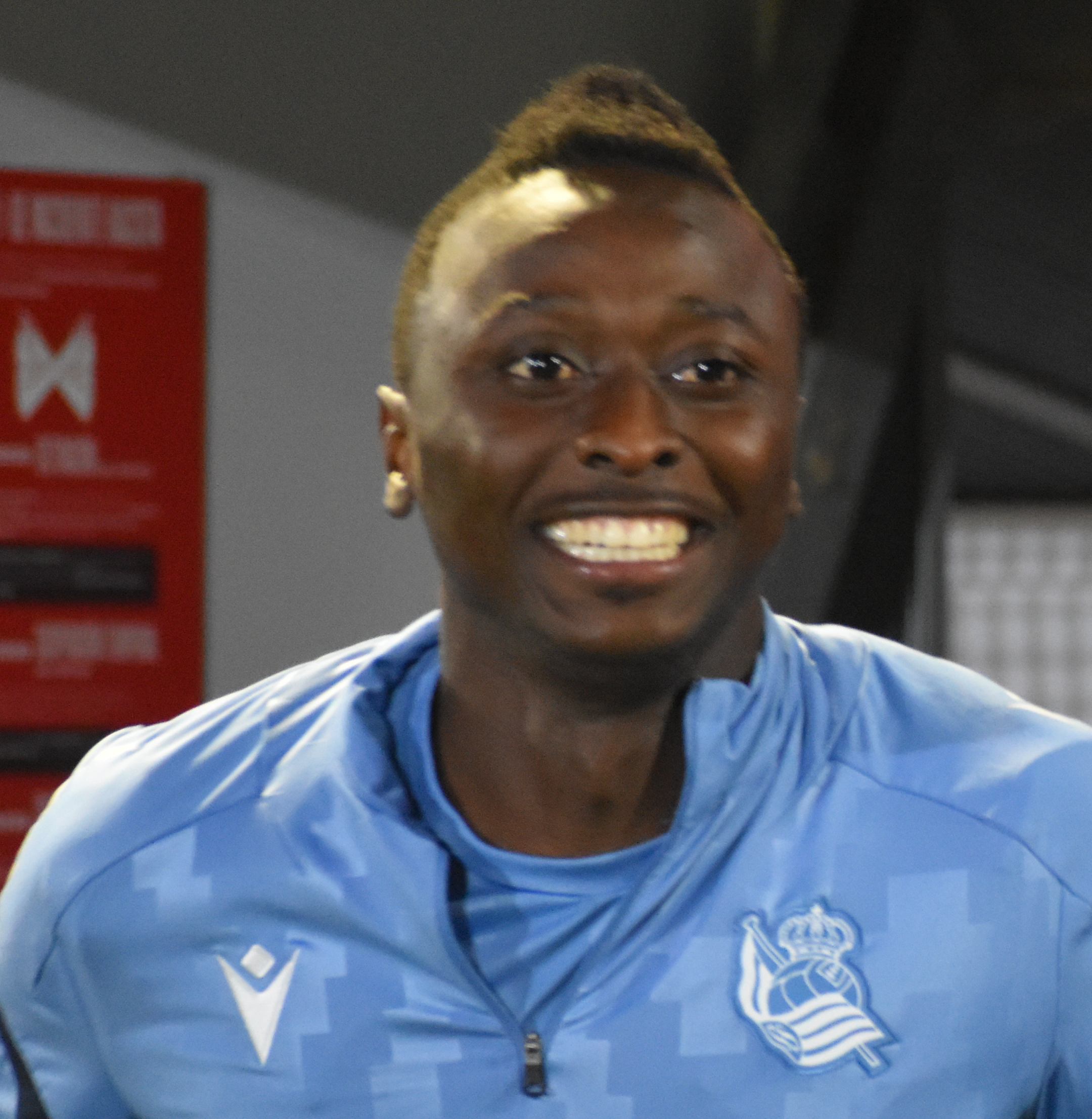
- Sadiq with Real Sociedad in 2025

Personal information
- Full name: Umar Sadiq Mesbah
- Date of birth: 2 February 1997 (age 29)
- Place of birth: Kaduna, Nigeria
- Height: 1.92 m (6 ft 4 in)
- Position: Striker

Team information
- Current team: Valencia
- Number: 6

Youth career
- Kuso Boys
- Future of Africa
- FCA
- 2014–2015: Spezia

Senior career*
Years	Team	Apps	(Gls)
2014–2016	Spezia	0	(0)
2014	→ Lavagnese (loan)	1	(0)
2015–2016	→ Roma (loan)	6	(2)
2016–2020	Roma	0	(0)
2016–2017	→ Bologna (loan)	7	(0)
2017	→ Torino (loan)	3	(0)
2018	→ NAC Breda (loan)	12	(5)
2018	→ Rangers (loan)	1	(0)
2019	→ Perugia (loan)	17	(3)
2019–2020	→ Partizan (loan)	24	(12)
2020	Partizan	10	(6)
2020–2022	Almería	79	(40)
2022–2026	Real Sociedad	40	(4)
2025	→ Valencia (loan)	16	(5)
2026–	Valencia	24	(6)

International career^{‡}
2016	Nigeria U23	6	(4)
2022–	Nigeria	12	(1)
Medal record
Bronze medal – third place	Olympic Games	2016
- * Club domestic league appearances and goals as of 4 November 2026 ‡ National team caps and goals as of 18 November 2024

Umar Sadiq Mesbah (born 2 February 1997) is a Nigerian professional footballer who plays as a striker for La Liga club Valencia and the Nigeria national team.

Sadiq formerly represented the Nigeria national under-23 team and was a member of the squad that won a bronze medal at the 2016 Summer Olympics.

== Club career ==
=== Early years ===
Born in Kaduna, Sadiq started playing football on the streets of his hometown at an early age. He later played for local team Kusa Boys, before joining the Future of Africa Football Academy and finally the Football College Abuja. In June 2013, Sadiq traveled with FCA to Croatia and participated at the Kvarnerska Rivijera youth tournament. He finished as the competition's top scorer and helped his team become the champions.

=== Spezia ===
Following his promising performances in Croatia, Sadiq was acquired by Italian club Spezia. He failed to make any first-team appearances, but played regularly for the youth setup. In the 2014–15 season, Sadiq became the Campionato Primavera top scorer, tallying an impressive 26 goals in 24 games.

==== Loan to Lavagnese ====
Shortly upon joining Spezia, Sadiq was loaned to Serie D side Lavagnese, making his senior debut in the final round of the 2013–14 season.

==== Loan to Roma ====
In July 2015, Sadiq joined Roma on a one-year loan. He was transferred alongside his teammate and compatriot Nura Abdullahi for €250,000 each with a buyout option of €1.25 million per player. Having bagged eight goals in his first three Primavera matches for Roma, Sadiq made his Serie A debut on 21 November, replacing Juan Iturbe after 88 minutes in a 2–2 away draw against Bologna. He scored his first goal on 20 December, netting only seven minutes after coming on as an 82nd-minute substitute for Mohamed Salah, helping his team to a 2–0 home win over Genoa. On 6 January 2016, Sadiq bagged his second goal in his first start for Roma, opening the scoring in the 7th minute of an eventual 3–3 away draw against Chievo. He finished the season with two goals in six Serie A appearances.

=== Roma ===
On 21 June 2016, it was announced that Roma exercised the option and signed Sadiq, as well as Nura, permanently until 30 June 2020. He traveled with the first team to the United States for the 2017 International Champions Cup, scoring in his only appearance against Paris Saint-Germain, as Roma lost after penalties.

==== Loan to Bologna ====
On 31 August 2016, Sadiq was sent on loan to Bologna until the end of the season with a purchase option. He appeared in seven Serie A games, before returning to Roma.

==== Loan to Torino ====
On 16 August 2017, it was announced that Sadiq would be joining Torino on loan until 30 June 2018. The deal included an option to make the move permanent with a buyback clause in favour of Roma.

==== Loan to NAC Breda ====
In January 2018, Sadiq moved on a six-month loan to Dutch side NAC Breda with an extension option. He helped the club narrowly avoid relegation, contributing with five goals in 12 Eredivisie appearances.

==== Loan to Rangers ====
In July 2018, Sadiq joined Scottish Premiership side Rangers on a season-long loan. After just four first-team appearances in all competitions, his loan spell was terminated by the end of the year.

==== Loan to Perugia ====
In January 2019, Sadiq joined Serie B side Perugia for the remainder of the season. He scored three times in 17 appearances, helping his team to an eight-place finish with a chance to win promotion to Serie A via the playoffs. However, Perugia lost in the preliminary round to Verona after extra time.

==== Loan to Partizan ====
In early July 2019, Sadiq completed his loan move to Serbian club Partizan that included an option to buy. He made his official debut in a 1–0 away league win against Inđija on 21 July. On 4 August, Sadiq netted his first goal for the club in a 4–0 home league victory over Mačva Šabac. He subsequently scored the opener in an eventual 3–1 home win versus Turkish club Yeni Malatyaspor in the first leg of the Europa League third qualifying round. Sadiq played his first Eternal derby on 22 September in a 2–0 win over bitter rivals Red Star. Sadiq spent 64 minutes on the field when he was replaced by Seydouba Soumah. On 3 October, he netted a brace to give his team a 2–1 away victory against Astana in Europa League's Group L. He scored his first senior hat-trick in a 6–2 home league win over Javor Ivanjica on 22 November.

=== Almería ===
On 5 October 2020, Sadiq joined Spanish side Almería in the Segunda División on a five-year contract.

=== Real Sociedad ===
On 1 September 2022, Sadiq signed a contract with Real Sociedad until the end of the 2027–28 season. Only two days later Sadiq scored first goal on his debut in a 1–1 home draw against Atlético Madrid. On 8 September, Sadiq played 46 minutes at Old Trafford in a 0–1 victory over Manchester United. Three days later, during Real Sociedad's La Liga fixture against Getafe, Sadiq suffered an Anterior cruciate ligament injury and was later ruled out of the season after undergoing surgery.

At the start of the 2023–24 La Liga campaign, Sadiq returned to the pitch as Real Sociedad held Girona to a 1–1 draw. The Nigerian international came on as a substitute for Mikel Oyarzabal in the 74th minute. Sadiq came off the bench in the 72nd minute, again replacing Oyarzabal, against Inter Milan for his UEFA Champions League debut. On 26 November 2023, Sadiq scored his first goal of the season in a 2–1 win over Sevilla.

==== Loan to Valencia ====
On 4 January 2025, Valencia announced that they had reached an agreement with Real Sociedad to sign Sadiq on loan until 30 June 2025.

=== Valencia ===
On 8 January 2026, Sadiq re-joined Valencia on a permanent deal until June 2028.

== International career ==
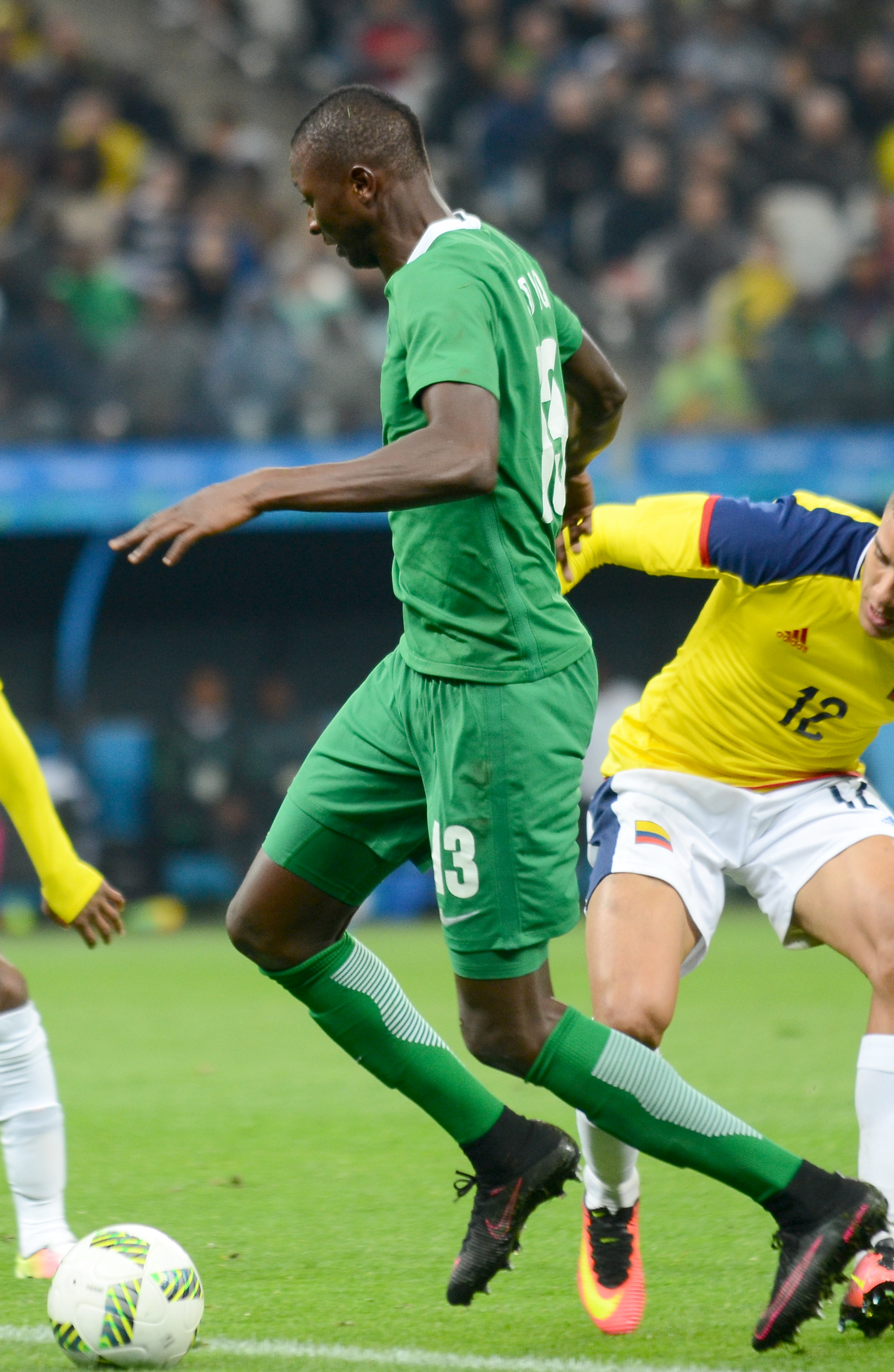
Sadiq in action for Nigeria against Colombia at the 2016 Olympics

In July 2016, Sadiq was named in Nigeria's final 18-man squad for the 2016 Summer Olympics. He appeared in all six of his team's games and scored four goals in the process, including a brace in the third-place victory over Honduras.

After two successful seasons at Partizan and a move to the rising Almería, Sadiq received a call-up to the Nigeria national team for the 2021 African Cup of Nations qualifying matches against Benin and Lesotho on 27 and 30 March 2021 respectively.

On 29 December 2023, Sadiq was named in the Nigerian squad for the 2023 Africa Cup of Nations in Ivory Coast. However, he sustained an injury in early January 2024 and was replaced by Paul Onuachu.

== Career statistics ==
=== Club ===
As of match played 23 May 2026

Appearances and goals by club, season and competition
Club	Season	League			National cup (Note: Includes Serbian Cup, Copa del Rey)		League cup (Note: Includes Scottish League Cup)		Continental		Other		Total	
Club	Season	Division	Apps	Goals	Apps	Goals	Apps	Goals	Apps	Goals	Apps	Goals	Apps	Goals
Spezia	2013–14	Serie B	0	0	0	0	—		—		0	0	0	0
Spezia	2014–15	Serie B	0	0	0	0	—		—		0	0	0	0
Spezia	2015–16	Serie B	0	0	0	0	—		—		0	0	0	0
Spezia	Total		0	0	0	0	0	0	0	0	0	0	0	0
Lavagnese (loan)	2013–14	Serie D	1	0	0	0	—		—		0	0	1	0
Roma (loan)	2015–16	Serie A	6	2	0	0	—		0	0	—		6	2
Roma	2016–17	Serie A	0	0	0	0	—		0	0	—		0	0
Roma	2017–18	Serie A	0	0	0	0	—		0	0	—		0	0
Roma	2018–19	Serie A	0	0	0	0	—		0	0	—		0	0
Roma	2019–20	Serie A	0	0	0	0	—		0	0	—		0	0
Roma	Total		6	2	0	0	0	0	0	0	0	0	6	2
Bologna (loan)	2016–17	Serie A	7	0	0	0	—		—		—		7	0
Torino (loan)	2017–18	Serie A	3	0	0	0	—		—		—		3	0
NAC Breda (loan)	2017–18	Eredivisie	12	5	0	0	—		—		—		12	5
Rangers (loan)	2018–19	Scottish Premiership	1	0	0	0	2	0	1 (Note: Appearances in UEFA Europa League)	0	—		4	0
Perugia (loan)	2018–19	Serie B	17	3	0	0	—		—		1 (Note: Appearances in Serie B promotion play-offs)	0	18	3
Partizan (loan)	2019–20	Serbian SuperLiga	24	12	3	0	—		12	5	—		39	17
Partizan	2020–21	Serbian SuperLiga	10	6	0	0	—		3	0	—		13	6
Almería	2020–21	Segunda División	40	20	3	2	—		—		—		43	22
Almería	2021–22	Segunda División	36	18	2	1	—		—		—		38	19
Almería	2022–23	La Liga	3	2	—		—		—		—		3	2
Almería	Total		79	40	5	3	0	0	0	0	0	0	84	43
Real Sociedad	2022–23	La Liga	2	1	0	0	—		1	0	—		3	1
Real Sociedad	2023–24	La Liga	26	3	6	0	—		4 (Note: Appearances in UEFA Champions League)	0	—		36	3
Real Sociedad	2024–25	La Liga	7	0	1	0	—		3	0	—		11	0
Real Sociedad	2025–26	La Liga	5	0	2	1	—		—		—		7	1
Real Sociedad	Total		40	4	9	1	0	0	8	0	0	0	57	5
Valencia (loan)	2024–25	La Liga	16	5	3	1	—		—		—		19	6
Valencia	2025–26	La Liga	20	4	2	2	—		—		—		22	6
Career total			236	81	22	7	2	0	24	5	1	0	285	93

=== International ===
As of match played 18 November 2024

Appearances and goals by national team and year
National team	Year	Apps	Goals
Nigeria	2022	7	1
Nigeria	2023	3	0
Nigeria	2024	2	0
Total		12	1

Scores and results list Nigeria's goal tally first, score column indicates score after each Sadiq goal.

List of international goals scored by Umar Sadiq
No.	Date	Venue	Opponent	Score	Result	Competition
1	19 January 2022	Roumdé Adjia Stadium, Garoua, Cameroon	Guinea-Bissau	1–0	2–0	2021 Africa Cup Of Nations

== Honours ==
Roma Primavera

- Campionato Nazionale Primavera: 2015–16

Almería

- Segunda División: 2021–22

Nigeria U23

- Olympic Games bronze medal: 2016

Individual

- La Liga Goal of the Month: March 2025
