= Lucas Robertone =

Argentine footballer

Personal information
- Full name: Lucas Gastón Robertone
- Date of birth: 18 March 1997 (age 29)
- Place of birth: Concordia, Argentina
- Height: 1.69 m (5 ft 7 in)
- Position: Central midfielder

Team information
- Current team: Vélez Sarsfield (on loan from Almería)
- Number: 8

Youth career
- 2011–2016: Vélez Sarsfield

Senior career*
Years	Team	Apps	(Gls)
2016–2020	Vélez Sarsfield	63	(11)
2020–	Almería	145	(9)
2026–	→ Vélez Sarsfield (loan)	15	(1)
- * Club domestic league appearances and goals as of 16:53, 16 June 2026 (UTC)

Lucas Gastón Robertone (born 18 March 1997) is an Argentine professional footballer who plays as a central midfielder for Vélez Sarsfield, on loan from Segunda División club Almería.

== Career ==
=== Vélez Sarsfield ===
Born in Concordia, Entre Ríos, Robertone joined Vélez Sarsfield's youth setup in 2011, aged 14. He made his first team debut on 16 August 2016, starting in a 1–1 away draw (3–4 penalty loss) against Juventud Unida de Gualeguaychú, for the season's Copa Argentina.

Robertone made his Primera División debut on 27 August 2016, coming on as a late substitute for Gonzalo Díaz in a 2–0 away loss against Gimnasia y Esgrima La Plata. After being rarely used in his first season, he started to feature more regularly, and scored his first senior goal on 24 February 2018, netting the game's only in a 1–0 home win against River Plate.

On 21 April 2018, Robertone scored a brace in a 4–2 away defeat of Temperley. On 13 November, he renewed his contract until 2021.

=== Almería ===
On 1 October 2020, Robertone signed a five-year contract with Spanish Segunda División side UD Almería, who paid a rumoured fee of €3.4 million for 50% of his federative rights; the club is also obliged to buy another 30% if certain variables are reached. He immediately became a regular starter, helping the club to achieve promotion to La Liga in 2022, as champions.

==== Return to Vélez Sarsfield (loan) ====
On 16 January 2026, after spending the first half of the campaign nearly without playing, Robertone returned to Vélez on a one-year loan deal.

== Honours ==
Almería

- Segunda División: 2021–22
