= UD Pavía =

Association football club in Spain

Pavía
- Full name: Unión Deportiva Pavía
- Founded: 1955
- Ground: Tito Pedro, Almería, Spain
- Chairman: Joaquín García
- Manager: Domingo Jesús Ais Escribano
- League: Primera Andaluza Almería
- 2024–25: Primera Andaluza Almería, 4th of 16
- Website: http://www.udpavia.com/
Home colours

Unión Deportiva Pavía is a football team based in Almería. Founded in July 1955, the team plays in Primera Andaluza Almería.

The club's home ground is Complejo Deportivo Tito Pedro.

== Season to season ==
Season	Tier	Division	Place	Copa del Rey
1955–1961	—	Regional	—	
1961–62	5	1ª Reg.	1st	
1962–63	5	1ª Reg.		
1963–64	5	1ª Reg.	4th	
1964–65	5	1ª Reg.		
1965–66	5	1ª Reg.	4th	
1966–67	5	1ª Reg.	6th	
1967–68	5	1ª Reg.		
1968–69	5	1ª Reg.		
1969–70	5	1ª Reg.	15th	
1970–71	5	1ª Reg.	17th	
1971–72	DNP			
1972–73	DNP			
1973–74	5	1ª Reg.	11th	
1974–75	5	1ª Reg.	18th	
1975–76	6	1ª Reg.	21st	
1976–77	DNP			
1977–78	DNP			
1978–79	6	1ª Reg.	5th	
1979–80	6	1ª Reg.	5th	

Season	Tier	Division	Place	Copa del Rey
1980–81	5	Reg. Pref.	12th	
1981–82	5	Reg. Pref.	6th	
1982–83	6	1ª Reg.	1st	
1983–84	5	Reg. Pref.	4th	
1984–85	6	1ª Reg.	4th	
1985–86	6	1ª Reg.	1st	
1986–87	5	Reg. Pref.	4th	
1987–88	5	Reg. Pref.	3rd	
1988–89	5	Reg. Pref.	12th	
1989–90	DNP			
1990–91	5	Reg. Pref.	11th	
1991–92	5	Reg. Pref.	14th	
1992–93	5	Reg. Pref.	15th	
1993–94	5	Reg. Pref.	6th	
1994–95	5	Reg. Pref.	4th	
1995–96	5	Reg. Pref.	5th	
1996–97	5	Reg. Pref.	8th	
1997–98	5	Reg. Pref.	13th	
1998–99	5	Reg. Pref.	18th	
1999–2000	6	1ª Reg.	4th	

Season	Tier	Division	Place	Copa del Rey
2000–01	5	Reg. Pref.	5th	
2001–02	5	Reg. Pref.	12th	
2002–03	5	Reg. Pref.	5th	
2003–04	5	Reg. Pref.	12th	
2004–05	6	Reg. Pref.	7th	
2005–06	6	Reg. Pref.	11th	
2006–07	6	Reg. Pref.	15th	
2007–08	6	Reg. Pref.	11th	
2008–09	6	Reg. Pref.	1st	
2009–10	5	1ª And.	10th	
2010–11	5	1ª And.	11th	
2011–12	5	1ª And.	6th	
2012–13	5	1ª And.	10th	
2013–14	5	1ª And.	5th	
2014–15	5	1ª And.	5th	
2015–16	5	1ª And.	5th	
2016–17	5	Div. Hon.	14th	
2017–18	5	Div. Hon.	16th	
2018–19	6	1ª And.	1st	
2019–20	6	1ª And.	3rd	

Season	Tier	Division	Place	Copa del Rey
2020–21	6	1ª And.	2nd	
2021–22	7	1ª And.	2nd	
2022–23	6	Div. Hon.	16th	
2023–24	7	1ª And.	7th	
2024–25	7	1ª And.	4th	
2025–26	7	1ª And.		
