= Largie Ramazani =

Belgian footballer (born 2001)

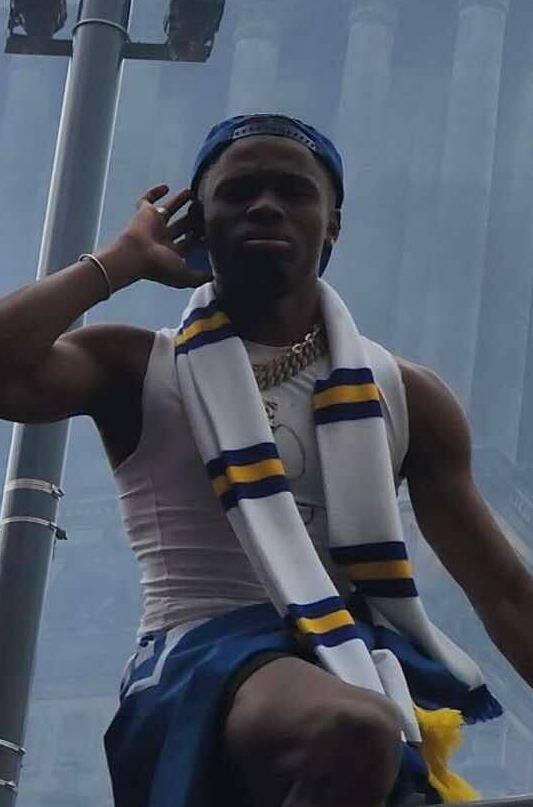
- Ramazani in 2025

Personal information
- Full name: Largie Ramazani
- Date of birth: 27 February 2001 (age 25)
- Place of birth: Berchem-Sainte-Agathe, Belgium
- Height: 1.67 m (5 ft 6 in)
- Position: Wide midfielder

Team information
- Current team: Burnley (on loan from Leeds United)
- Number: 19

Youth career
- Anderlecht
- 2013–2017: Charlton Athletic
- 2017–2020: Manchester United

Senior career*
Years	Team	Apps	(Gls)
2019–2020	Manchester United	0	(0)
2020–2024	Almería	116	(19)
2024–	Leeds United	29	(6)
2025–2026	→ Valencia (loan)	27	(6)
2026–	→ Burnley (loan)	12	(4)

International career
2017–2018	Belgium U17	13	(2)
2018–2019	Belgium U18	5	(0)
2020	Belgium U19	1	(1)
2022–2023	Belgium U21	8	(3)
- * Club domestic league appearances and goals as of 09:41, 8 November 2026 (UTC)

Largie Ramazani (born 27 February 2001) is a Belgian professional footballer who plays as a left midfielder for EFL Championship club Burnley on loan from Premier League club Leeds United.

== Club career ==
=== Early career ===
Born in Berchem-Sainte-Agathe, Brussels, Ramazani moved to London at the age of 12, and joined Charlton Athletic's youth setup after failed trials at Fulham and Chelsea. On 3 July 2017, aged 16, he signed a four-year deal with Manchester United.

=== Manchester United ===
After impressing with the under-18s, Ramazani signed his first professional contract on 21 March 2018. He then progressed through the club's youth setup, playing for the under-21 and under-23 squads.

Ramazani made his senior debut for United on 28 November 2019, coming on as a late substitute for James Garner in a 2–1 UEFA Europa League away loss against FC Astana. He was released from the club the following June, after reportedly having rejected a new deal.

=== Almería ===
On 24 August 2020, free agent Ramazani signed a five-year contract with Spanish Segunda División club UD Almería. On 14 August 2022, he scored his first La Liga goal for Almería after promotion, in a 2–1 defeat against Real Madrid.

On 1 October 2023, Ramazani provided a hat-trick of assists to Luis Suarez's hat-trick in a 3–3 draw against Granada CF.

=== Leeds United ===
On 22 August 2024, Ramazani signed a four-year contract with EFL Championship club Leeds United for an undisclosed fee. On 28 April 2025, Ramazani scored his first brace with Leeds, netting two goals after coming off of the bench in a 4–0 win vs. Bristol City. On 3 May 2025, Ramazani won the Championship title with Leeds following a 2–1 victory over Plymouth Argyle at Home Park.

=== Valencia (loan) ===
On 28 August 2025 he joined La Liga club Valencia on loan for the season.

=== Burnley (loan) ===
On 1 September 2026, Ramazani joined EFL Championship club Burnley on loan for the remainder of the 2026-27 season.

== International career ==
Ramazani is of Burundian descent, being available to play for Burundi and Belgium. He represented the latter at under-17, under-18 and under-19 levels.

== Personal life ==
Ramazani has Burundian parents. His older brother Diamant is also a footballer. A right back, he notably represented Lokeren.

== Career statistics ==
As of match played 7 November 2026

Appearances and goals by club, season and competition
Club	Season	League			National cup (Note: Includes FA Cup, Copa del Rey)		League cup (Note: Includes EFL Cup)		Continental		Other		Total	
Club	Season	Division	Apps	Goals	Apps	Goals	Apps	Goals	Apps	Goals	Apps	Goals	Apps	Goals
Manchester United U23	2019–20	—			—		—		—		3 (Note: Appearances in EFL Trophy)	1	3	1
Manchester United	2019–20	Premier League	0	0	0	0	0	0	1 (Note: Appearance in UEFA Europa League)	0	—		1	0
Almería	2020–21	Segunda División	23	4	4	1	—		—		2 (Note: Appearances in Segunda División promotion play-offs)	0	29	5
Almería	2021–22	Segunda División	30	8	3	1	—		—		—		33	9
Almería	2022–23	La Liga	33	3	1	0	—		—		—		34	3
Almería	2023–24	La Liga	29	3	2	1	—		—		—		31	4
Almería	2024–25	Segunda División	1	1	—		—		—		—		1	1
Almería	Total		116	19	10	3	—		—		2	0	128	22
Leeds United	2024–25	Championship	29	6	2	1	0	0	—		—		31	7
Leeds United	2025–26	Premier League	0	0	—		0	0	—		—		0	0
Leeds United	Total		29	6	2	1	0	0	—		—		31	7
Valencia (loan)	2025–26	La Liga	27	6	4	0	—		—		—		31	6
Burnley (loan)	2026–27	Championship	12	4	0	0	—		—		—		12	4
Career total			184	35	16	4	0	0	1	0	5	1	206	40

== Honours ==
Almería

- Segunda División: 2021–22

Leeds United

- EFL Championship: 2024–25
