= 2022–23 UD Almería season =

UD Almería
2022–23 season
- Owner: Turki Al-Sheikh
- President: Turki Al-Sheikh
- Head coach: Rubi
- Stadium: Power Horse Stadium
- La Liga: 17th
- Copa del Rey: First round
- Top goalscorer: League: El Bilal Touré (7); All: El Bilal Touré (7)
- Biggest win: Almería 3–0 Mallorca
- Biggest defeat: Athletic Bilbao 4–0 Almería; Girona 6–2 Almería
Home colours	Away colours	Third colours

The 2022–23 season was the 34th season in the history of UD Almería and their first season back in the top flight since 2015. The club participated in La Liga and the Copa del Rey.

== Players ==
As of 24 March 2023.

Note: Flags indicate national team as defined under FIFA eligibility rules; some limited exceptions apply. Players may hold more than one non-FIFA nationality.

No.	Pos.	Nation	Player
1	GK	ESP	Diego Mariño
2	DF	BRA	Kaiky
3	MF	ESP	Gonzalo Melero
4	MF	ESP	Íñigo Eguaras
5	MF	ARG	Lucas Robertone
6	MF	ESP	César de la Hoz (captain)
7	MF	BEL	Largie Ramazani
8	MF	ESP	Francisco Portillo
9	FW	MLI	El Bilal Touré
10	MF	ESP	Adri Embarba
11	FW	POR	Dyego Sousa
12	FW	BRA	Léo Baptistão
13	GK	ESP	Fernando Martínez

No.	Pos.	Nation	Player
14	MF	BRA	Lázaro
15	DF	ESP	Sergio Akieme
16	FW	COL	Luis Suárez (on loan from Marseille)
17	MF	ESP	Alejandro Pozo
18	MF	ESP	Arnau Puigmal
19	DF	BRA	Rodrigo Ely
20	DF	ESP	Álex Centelles
21	DF	ESP	Chumi
22	DF	SRB	Srđan Babić (vice-captain)
23	MF	POR	Samú Costa
24	DF	GBS	Houboulang Mendes
25	GK	ESP	Diego Fuoli

=== Reserve team ===
Note: Flags indicate national team as defined under FIFA eligibility rules; some limited exceptions apply. Players may hold more than one non-FIFA nationality.

No.	Pos.	Nation	Player
26	MF	SVK	Martin Šviderský
28	MF	POR	Gui Guedes

No.	Pos.	Nation	Player
33	FW	ESP	Carlos Rojas
—	FW	SRB	Marko Milovanović

=== Out on loan ===
Note: Flags indicate national team as defined under FIFA eligibility rules; some limited exceptions apply. Players may hold more than one non-FIFA nationality.

No.	Pos.	Nation	Player
—	DF	ESP	Iván Martos (at Cartagena until 30 June 2023)
—	DF	SRB	Nikola Maraš (at Alavés until 30 June 2023)
—	DF	ESP	Arnau Solà (at Murcia until 30 June 2023)
—	MF	ESP	Dani Albiar (at Cartagena B until 30 June 2023)
—	MF	ESP	Javi Robles (at Fuenlabrada until 30 June 2023)

No.	Pos.	Nation	Player
—	FW	ENG	Arvin Appiah (at Málaga until 30 June 2023)
—	FW	URU	Cristian Olivera (at Boston River until 30 June 2023)
—	FW	ESP	Jordi Escobar (at Betis Deportivo until 30 June 2023)
—	FW	URU	Juan Manuel Gutiérrez (at Nacional until 30 June 2023)

== Transfers ==
=== In ===
Date	Player	From	Type	Fee	Ref
5 June 2022	(Serbia) Srđan Babić	(Serbia) Red Star Belgrade	Buyout clause	Undisclosed	
6 June 2022	(Spain) Alejandro Pozo	Sevilla	Buyout clause	Undisclosed	
23 June 2022	(Portugal) Gui Guedes	(Portugal) Vitória de Guimarães	Transfer	Undisclosed	
30 June 2022	(Serbia) Dragan Rosić	Albacete	Loan return		
6 July 2022	(France) Houboulang Mendes	(France) Lorient	Transfer	Undisclosed	
7 July 2022	(Slovakia) Martin Šviderský	(England) Manchester United	Transfer	Free	
11 July 2022	(Brazil) Kaiky	(Brazil) Santos	Transfer	€7m	
11 July 2022	(Serbia) Marko Milovanović	(Serbia) Partizan	Transfer	Undisclosed	
10 August 2022	(Spain) Fernando Pacheco	Alavés	Transfer	Undisclosed	
11 August 2022	(Brazil) Léo Baptistão	(Brazil) Santos	Transfer	Undisclosed	
24 August 2022	(Spain) Adri Embarba	Espanyol	Transfer	Undisclosed	
1 September 2022	(Brazil) Lázaro	(Brazil) Flamengo	Transfer	Undisclosed	
1 September 2022	(Spain) Gonzalo Melero	Levante	Transfer	Undisclosed	
1 September 2022	(Mali) El Bilal Touré	(France) Reims	Transfer	Undisclosed	
5 December 2022	(Colombia) Luis Suárez	(France) Marseille	Loan		
30 December 2022	(England) Arvin Appiah	Tenerife	Loan return		
25 January 2023	(Spain) Diego Mariño	Sporting Gijón	Transfer	Undisclosed	

=== Out ===
Date	Player	To	Type	Fee	Ref
1 July 2022	(Spain) Aitor Buñuel	Released			
1 July 2022	(Georgia (country)) Giorgi Makaridze	Released			
1 July 2022	(Portugal) Nélson Monte	(Ukraine) Dnipro-1	Loan return		
17 July 2022	(Spain) Javi Robles	Fuenlabrada	Loan		
19 July 2022	(Portugal) Daniel Carriço	Released			
22 July 2022	(Spain) Juan Villar	Huesca	Transfer	Free	
11 August 2022	(Serbia) Nikola Maraš	Alavés	Loan		
24 August 2022	(Spain) José Carlos Lazo	Espanyol	Transfer	Undisclosed	
30 August 2022	(Serbia) Dragan Rosić	Released			
1 September 2022	(England) Arvin Appiah	Tenerife	Loan		
1 September 2022	(Nigeria) Umar Sadiq	Real Sociedad	Transfer	Undisclosed	
1 September 2022	(Spain) Curro Sánchez	Burgos	Transfer	Free	
9 January 2023	(England) Arvin Appiah	Málaga	Loan		
19 January 2023	(Spain) Iván Martos	Cartagena	Loan		
31 January 2023	(Spain) Javi Robles	Released			
1 February 2023	(Spain) Fernando Pacheco	Espanyol	Transfer	Undisclosed	
3 February 2023	(Portugal) Gui Guedes	Lugo	Loan		

== Pre-season and friendlies ==
Win Draw Loss Fixtures

17 July 2022 Friendly	Almería	1–0	Vélez	Almería, Spain
19:30 CEST (UTC+1)				Stadium: Power Horse Stadium

23 July 2022 Friendly	Almería	1–2	Córdoba	Jerez de la Frontera, Spain
20:00 CEST (UTC+1)				Stadium: Campo Hotel Barceló Montecastillo

24 July 2022 Friendly	San Fernando	2–3	Almería	San Fernando, Spain
19:30 CEST (UTC+1)				Stadium: Estadio Iberoamericano

30 July 2022 Friendly	Granada	3–2	Almería	Jerez de la Frontera, Spain
19:00 CEST (UTC+1)				Stadium: Campo Hotel Barceló Montecastillo

5 August 2022 Friendly	Almería	1–0	Cartagena	Almería, Spain
19:30 CEST (UTC+1)				Stadium: Power Horse Stadium

3 December 2022 Friendly	Sturm Graz	1–0	Almería	Benahavís, Spain
16:00 CET (UTC+1)	Emegha 60'	Report		Stadium: Campo La Quinta; Referee: Enrique Pareja Nieto

4 December 2022 Friendly	Hearts	Abandoned	Almería	Coín, Spain
12:00 CET (UTC+1)	Cochrane (red card) 39'		Dyego Sousa (penalty missed) 17', 28'; Ely (red card) 39'	Stadium: Estadio de la Fuensanta
Note: The match was abandoned just before half-time due to an altercation with Almería leading 1–0.

9 December 2022 Friendly	Al-Nassr	1–1	Almería	Riyadh, Saudi Arabia
13:30 CET (UTC+1)		Report		Stadium: Prince Faisal bin Fahd Stadium

16 December 2022 Friendly	Almería	1–1	Torino	San Pedro del Pinatar, Spain
17:00 CET (UTC+1)				Stadium: Pinatar Arena

22 December 2022 Friendly	Almería	2–0	Lazio	Almería, Spain
18:30 CET (UTC+1)	Ramazani (yellow card) 24'; De la Hoz (yellow card) 25'; Touré 35'; Ramazani 46'			Stadium: Power Horse Stadium; Referee: José María Sánchez Martínez (Spain)

== Competitions ==
=== Overall record ===
Competition	First match	Last match	Starting round	Final position	Record							
Competition	First match	Last match	Starting round	Final position	Pld	W	D	L	GF	GA	GD	Win %
La Liga	14 August 2022	4 June 2023	Matchday 1	17th	38	11	8	19	49	65	−16	28.95
Copa del Rey	13 November 2022		First round	First round	1	0	0	1	0	2	−2	0.00
Total					39	11	8	20	49	67	−18	28.21

Source: Soccerway

=== La Liga ===
==== League table ====
Pos	Team	Pld	W	D	L	GF	GA	GD	Pts	Qualification or relegation
15	Getafe	38	10	12	16	34	45	−11	42 (Note: Head-to-head points: Cádiz 8, Getafe 5, Valencia 3.)	
16	Valencia	38	11	9	18	42	45	−3	42	
17	Almería	38	11	8	19	49	65	−16	41	
18	Valladolid (R)	38	11	7	20	33	63	−30	40	Relegation to Segunda División
19	Espanyol (R)	38	8	13	17	52	69	−17	37	Relegation to Segunda División

Source: LaLiga Santander
Rules for classification: 1) Points; 2) Head-to-head points; 3) Head-to-head goal difference; 4) Goal difference; 5) Goals scored; 6) Fair-play points (Note: Head-to-head record is used only after all the matches between the teams in question have been played)
(R) Relegated

==== Results summary ====
Overall								Home						Away					
Pld	W	D	L	GF	GA	GD	Pts	W	D	L	GF	GA	GD	W	D	L	GF	GA	GD
38	11	8	19	49	65	−16	41	10	3	6	29	22	+7	1	5	13	20	43	−23

Source: La Liga

==== Results by round ====
Round	1	2	3	4	5	6	7	8	9	10	11	12	13	14	15	16	17	18	19	20	21	22	23	24	25	26	27	28	29	30	31	32	33	34	35	36	37	38
Ground	H	A	H	A	H	A	A	H	A	H	A	H	A	H	A	H	H	A	H	A	H	A	H	H	A	H	A	H	A	H	A	A	H	A	H	A	H	A
Result	L	D	W	L	L	L	L	W	L	W	L	W	L	W	D	L	D	D	W	L	L	L	W	L	L	D	D	W	L	L	W	L	W	L	W	L	D	D
Position	15	12	10	13	14	16	18	15	18	13	15	13	15	14	13	14	13	14	11	14	15	17	15	18	19	19	19	16	17	17	15	16	14	15	14	15	16	17

Source: La Liga
A = Away; H = Home; W = Win; D = Draw; L = Loss

==== Matches ====
The league fixtures were announced on 23 June 2022.

14 August 2022 1	Almería	1–2	Real Madrid	Almería
22:00 CEST (UTC+2)	Ramazani 6'; Sadiq (yellow card) 40'; Curro (yellow card) 66'; Puigmal (yellow card) 86'	Report	Camavinga (yellow card) 40'; Vázquez 61'; Alaba 75'	Stadium: Power Horse Stadium; Attendance: 6,103; Referee: Juan Martínez Munuera

22 August 2022 2	Elche	1–1	Almería	Elche
20:00 CEST (UTC+2)	Collado 30'; Gumbau (yellow card) 52'	Report	Sadiq 23'; Centelles (red card) 32'; Eguaras (yellow card) 54'; Akieme (yellow card) 55'; Baptistão (yellow card) 86'; Kaiky (yellow card) 86'	Stadium: Martínez Valero; Attendance: 23,361; Referee: Isidro Díaz de Mera Escuderos

27 August 2022 3	Almería	2–1	Sevilla	Almería
22:00 CEST (UTC+2)	Eguaras (yellow card) 33'; Ramazani 42'; Sadiq 55'; Kaiky (yellow card) 71'; De la Hoz (yellow card) 78'; Baptistão (yellow card) 84'; Costa (yellow card) 90+1'	Report	Lamela (yellow card) 12'; Rekik (yellow card) 15'; Torres 30'; Mir (yellow card) 45'; Navas (yellow card) 49'; Carmona (yellow card) 70'; Isco (yellow card) 78'; Delaney (yellow card) 80'; Telles (yellow card) 83'	Stadium: Power Horse Stadium; Attendance: 13,788; Referee: Jesús Gil Manzano

5 September 2022 4	Valladolid	1–0	Almería	Valladolid
21:00 CEST (UTC+2)	J. Sánchez (yellow card) 90+2'; Wiessman 90+3'	Report	Akieme (yellow card) 14'; De la Hoz (yellow card) 41'; Embarba (yellow card) 77'; Kaiky (yellow card) 80'; Costa (yellow card) 90+1'; Milovanović (yellow card) 90+2'	Stadium: José Zorrilla; Attendance: 20,260; Referee: Pablo González Fuertes

12 September 2022 5	Almería	0–1	Osasuna	Almería
21:00 CEST (UTC+2)		Report	D. García (yellow card) 5'; Ávila 28'; Gómez (yellow card) 81'	Stadium: Power Horse Stadium; Attendance: 12,397; Referee: Javier Iglesias Villanueva

17 September 2022 6	Mallorca	1–0	Almería	Palma
14:00 CEST (UTC+2)	Ruiz de Galarreta (yellow card) 5'; Maffeo 25'; Costa (yellow card) 52'; Lee (yellow card) 90+5'	Report	Robertone (yellow card) 36'; Chumi (yellow card) 65'; Ramazani (yellow card) 78'; Ely (yellow card) 90'; Puigmal (yellow card) 90+5'; Sousa (yellow card) 90+6'	Stadium: Visit Mallorca Stadium; Attendance: 12,687; Referee: Juan Martínez Munuera

30 September 2022 7	Athletic Bilbao	4–0	Almería	Bilbao
21:00 CEST (UTC+2)	I. Williams 10'; Sancet 17'; Yeray (yellow card) 37'; N. Williams 62'; Vesga 84' (pen.)	Report	Robertone (yellow card) 40'; Kaiky (yellow card) 57'; Puigmal (yellow card) 82'	Stadium: San Mamés; Attendance: 42,110; Referee: Juan Luis Pulido Santana

8 October 2022 8	Almería	3–1	Rayo Vallecano	Almería
14:00 CEST (UTC+2)	Robertone 8'; Babić 17'; Touré 39'; Costa (yellow card) 66'; Embarba (yellow card) 70' (yellow-red card) 87'	Report	Salvi (yellow card) 45+1'; Valentín (yellow card) 57'; Catena 81'	Stadium: Power Horse Stadium; Attendance: 10,783; Referee: Pablo González Fuertes

16 October 2022 9	Real Betis	3–1	Almería	Seville
21:00 CEST (UTC+2)	Carvalho 23', 71'; Canales (yellow card) 63'; Iglesias 66'	Report	Melero (yellow card) 6'; Touré 52'	Stadium: Benito Villamarín; Attendance: 46,112; Referee: Alejandro Muñiz Ruiz

20 October 2022 10	Almería	3–2	Girona	Almería
19:00 CEST (UTC+2)	Baptistão 13'; Touré 17'; Embarba 38'; Ramazani (yellow card) 84'	Report	Herrera (yellow card) 5'; Bueno (yellow card) 36'; Riquelme 47'; Stuani (penalty missed) 78', 83' (pen.); Espinosa (yellow card) 90+2'	Stadium: Power Horse Stadium; Attendance: 11,194; Referee: Guillermo Cuadra Fernández

23 October 2022 11	Villarreal	2–1	Almería	Valencia
18:30 CEST (UTC+2)	Moreno (yellow card) 7'; Baena (yellow card) 23' (yellow-red card) 56', (goal) 56'; Torres (yellow card) 57'; Jackson 90+4'	Report	Melero 31'; Akieme (yellow card) 61'	Stadium: Ciutat de València (Note: Villarreal are playing their home matches at Estadi Ciutat de València, Valencia, instead of their regular stadium, Estadio de la Cerámica, Villarreal, due to ongoing stadium renovations.); Attendance: 13,816; Referee: Ricardo De Burgos Bengoetxea

29 October 2022 12	Almería	3–1	Celta Vigo	Almería
14:00 CEST (UTC+2)	Embarba (yellow card) 22'; De la Hoz (yellow card) 27', (goal) 60'; Lázaro 52'; Melero (yellow card) 84'; Ely (yellow card) 90+2'; Eguaras 90+6'	Report	Veiga 25', (red card) 32'	Stadium: Power Horse Stadium; Attendance: 11,080; Referee: Carlos del Cerro Grande

5 November 2022 13	Barcelona	2–0	Almería	Barcelona
21:00 CET (UTC+1)	Lewandowski (penalty missed) 7'; Torres (yellow card) 9'; Dembélé (yellow card) 42', (goal) 48'; De Jong 62'	Report	Kaiky (yellow card) 6'	Stadium: Camp Nou; Attendance: 92,605; Referee: Pablo González Fuertes

9 November 2022 14	Almería	1–0	Getafe	Almería
19:00 CEST (UTC+2)	Ely (yellow card) 8' (yellow-red card) 87'; Baptistão 26', (yellow card) 35'; De la Hoz (yellow card) 53'; Robertone (yellow card) 72'; Fernando (yellow card) 86'; Babić (yellow card) 90+6'; Ramazani (yellow card) 90+6'	Report	Alderete (yellow card) 4'; Aleñá (yellow card) 27'; Munir (yellow card) 76'; Iglesias (yellow card) 90+6'	Stadium: Power Horse Stadium; Attendance: 11,454; Referee: Alejandro Muñiz Ruiz

30 December 2022 15	Cádiz	1–1	Almería	Cádiz
19:15 CET (UTC+1)	Fali (yellow card) 24'; José Mari (yellow card) 81'; Pérez 83'	Report	Melero 40'	Stadium: Nuevo Mirandilla; Attendance: 17,345; Referee: Juan Martínez Munuera

8 January 2023 16	Almería	0–2	Real Sociedad	Almería
14:00 CEST (UTC+2)	Babić (yellow card) 90+2'	Report	Silva 47'; Sørloth 53'	Stadium: Power Horse Stadium; Attendance: 12,020; Referee: Javier Alberola Rojas

15 January 2023 17	Almería	1–1	Atlético Madrid	Almería
16:15 CET (UTC+1)	Baptistão (yellow card) 17'; Touré 37'; Embarba (yellow card) 67'; Mendes (yellow card) 85'; Ely (yellow card) 90+3'	Report	Correa 18'; Kondogbia (yellow card) 40'; Reguilón (yellow card) 85' (yellow-red card) 89'; Saúl (yellow card) 90+2'	Stadium: Estadio de los Juegos Mediterráneos; Attendance: 14,128; Referee: José María Sánchez Martínez

23 January 2023 18	Valencia	2–2	Almería	Valencia
21:00 CET (UTC+1)	Cavani (yellow card) 45'; Kluivert 48'; Gayà 65'; Almeida (yellow card) 84'	Report	Ramazani (penalty missed) 44'; Chumi 54'; Portillo 74'; Melero (yellow card) 80'	Stadium: Mestalla; Attendance: 33,507; Referee: Jesús Gil Manzano

27 January 2023 19	Almería	3–1	Espanyol	Almería
21:00 CET (UTC+1)	Suárez 21'; Robertone (yellow card) 41'; Baptistão 61'; Portillo 77', (yellow card) 78'; Eguaras (yellow card) 90+7'	Report	Gil (yellow card) 44'; Souza (yellow card) 55'; Puado (yellow card) 57'; Joselu 90+3'	Stadium: Estadio de los Juegos Mediterráneos; Attendance: 11,629; Referee: Javier Iglesias Villanueva

6 February 2023 20	Rayo Vallecano	2–0	Almería	Madrid
21:00 CET (UTC+1)	Balliu (yellow card) 17'; Trejo (yellow card) 25'; Ely 54' (o.g.); Catena (yellow card) 57'; Á. García 63'	Report	Baptistão (yellow card) 13'; Akieme (yellow card) 31'; Robertone (yellow card) 45+1'	Stadium: Vallecas; Attendance: 11,783; Referee: César Soto Grado

11 February 2023 21	Almería	2–3	Real Betis	Almería
16:15 CET (UTC+1)	Suárez 27'; Eguaras (yellow card) 30'; Babić (yellow card) 38'; Costa 62'	Report	Rodri 6'; Canales 42'; González (yellow card) 49'; Guardado 70'; Rodríguez (yellow card) 89'	Stadium: Power Horse Stadium; Attendance: 14,310; Referee: Javier Alberola Rojas

17 February 2023 22	Girona	6–2	Almería	Girona
21:00 CET (UTC+1)	Castellanos 8'; Tsyhankov 34'; Riquelme 36'; Hernández 43'; B. García (yellow card) 59'; Martín 77'; Stuani 79'	Report	Ramazani 66'; Touré 81'; Suárez (yellow card) 90'	Stadium: Montilivi; Attendance: 8,879; Referee: Valentín Pizarro Gómez

26 February 2023 23	Almería	1–0	Barcelona	Almería
18:30 CET (UTC+1)	Touré 24'; Robertone (yellow card) 47'; Chumi (yellow card) 53'; Fernando (yellow card) 87'	Report	García (yellow card) 35'; Raphinha (yellow card) 54'; Gavi (yellow card) 57'	Stadium: Power Horse Stadium; Attendance: 15,279; Referee: Miguel Ángel Ortiz Arias

4 March 2023 24	Almería	0–2	Villarreal	Almería
16:15 CET (UTC+1)	De la Hoz (yellow card) 14'; Chumi (yellow card) 55'; Suárez (yellow card) 90+3'	Report	Foyth (yellow card) 56'; Albiol (yellow card) 67'; Gerard 76', (yellow card) 80'; Morales 88'; Lo Celso (yellow card) 90+3'	Stadium: Power Horse Stadium; Attendance: 13,311; Referee: Pablo González Fuertes

12 March 2023 25	Sevilla	2–1	Almería	Seville
16:15 CET (UTC+1)	Badé (yellow card) 32'; Ocampos 45+2' (pen.); Gudelj (yellow card) 71'; Lamela 73', (yellow card) 73'	Report	Akieme 2', (yellow card) 12'; Chumi (yellow card) 72'; Ely (yellow card) 83'; Baptistão (yellow card) 88'	Stadium: Ramón Sánchez Pizjuán; Attendance: 37,848; Referee: Ricardo de Burgos Bengoetxea

18 March 2023 26	Almería	1–1	Cádiz	Almería
14:00 CET (UTC+1)	Eguaras (yellow card) 28'; Melero 90+6' (pen.)	Report	Sobrino (yellow card) 38'; Martí 49'; Guardiola (yellow card) 52'; Ramos (yellow card) 73'; Mbaye (yellow card) 90+5'	Stadium: Power Horse Stadium; Attendance: 12,183; Referee: Carlos del Cerro Grande

2 April 2023 27	Celta Vigo	2–2	Almería	Vigo
14:00 CEST (UTC+2)	Seferovic 10'; Pérez 42', (yellow card) 45'; Aspas (yellow card) 82'; Veiga (yellow card) 83'	Report	Babić 7'; Puigmal (yellow card) 31', (goal) 32'; Fernando (yellow card) 62'; Costa (yellow card) 74'; Suárez (yellow card) 82'; Baptistão (yellow card) 83'	Stadium: Abanca-Balaídos; Attendance: 14,011; Referee: Alejandro Hernández Hernández

9 April 2023 28	Almería	2–1	Valencia	Almería
18:30 CEST (UTC+2)	Chumi (yellow card) 20'; Suárez (yellow card) 23'; Robertone (yellow card) 42'; Melero 49'; Babić 58'	Report	Foulquier (yellow card) 7'; Castillejo 61'; Pérez (yellow card) 86'	Stadium: Power Horse Stadium; Attendance: 14,039; Referee: José María Sánchez Martínez

16 April 2023 29	Atlético Madrid	2–1	Almería	Madrid
18:30 CEST (UTC+2)	Griezmann 5', 43'; Llorente (yellow card) 77'; Kondogbia (yellow card) 89'; Barrios (yellow card) 90+4'	Report	Babić (yellow card) 28'; Baptistão 37'; Ely (yellow card) 49'; Ramazani (yellow card) 90+4'	Stadium: Cívitas Metropolitano; Attendance: 59,204; Referee: Isidro Díaz de Mera Escuderos

22 April 2023 30	Almería	1–2	Athletic Bilbao	Almería
16:15 CEST (UTC+2)	Ely (yellow card) 68'; Centelles 90+2'; Pozo (yellow card) 90+4'	Report	N. Williams 9'; Sancet (yellow card) 21'; De Marcos 56'; Zarraga (yellow card) 65'; Berenguer (yellow card) 90'; Vesga (yellow card) 90+4'	Stadium: Power Horse Stadium; Attendance: 13,271; Referee: Valentín Pizarro Gómez

26 April 2023 31	Getafe	1–2	Almería	Getafe
19:30 CEST (UTC+2)	Alderete (yellow card) 11'; Djené (red card) 45+3'; Mayoral 71'; Iglesias (yellow card) 76'	Report	Suárez 7', 58'; Melero (yellow card) 26'; Babić (yellow card) 88'	Stadium: Coliseum Alfonso Pérez; Attendance: 10,260; Referee: Javier Alberola Rojas

29 April 2023 32	Real Madrid	4–2	Almería	Madrid
18:30 CEST (UTC+2)	Benzema 5', 17', 42' (pen.); Vinícius (yellow card) 37'; Rodrygo 47'; Camavinga (yellow card) 74'	Report	Lázaro 45+1', (yellow card) 66'; Robertone 61'; Mendes (yellow card) 67'	Stadium: Santiago Bernabéu; Attendance: 58,036; Referee: Guillermo Cuadra Fernández

2 May 2023 33	Almería	2–1	Elche	Almería
19:30 CEST (UTC+2)	Baptistão 35'; Embarba 52'; Ely (yellow card) 59'; De la Hoz (yellow card) 77'	Report	Nwankwo (yellow card) 20'; Clerc (yellow card) 50'; Ponce 90'	Stadium: Power Horse Stadium; Attendance: 13,352; Referee: Alejandro José Hernández Hernández

13 May 2023 34	Osasuna	3–1	Almería	Pamplona
16:15 CEST (UTC+2)	Budimir 46'; Ezzalzouli 51'; Gómez 81'	Report	Lázaro 90+2'	Stadium: El Sadar; Attendance: 19,747; Referee: Antonio Mateu Lahoz

20 May 2023 35	Almería	3–0	Mallorca	Almería
18:30 CEST (UTC+2)	Ely (yellow card) 7'; Lázaro 12', 42', 58'	Report	Lee (yellow card) 67'; Hadžikadunić (yellow card) 83'	Stadium: Power Horse Stadium; Attendance: 12,791; Referee: Carlos del Cerro Grande

23 May 2023 36	Real Sociedad	1–0	Almería	San Sebastián
19:30 CEST (UTC+2)	Kubo 45+4'	Report	Suárez (red card) 36'; Eguaras (yellow card) 88'	Stadium: Reale Arena; Attendance: 31,574; Referee: Pablo González Fuertes

28 May 2023 37	Almería	0–0	Valladolid	Almería
19:00 CEST (UTC+2)		Report	Monchu (yellow card) 70'; Plata (yellow card) 89'; Hongla (yellow card) 90+2'; Kenedy (yellow card) 90+6'	Stadium: Power Horse Stadium; Attendance: 14,608; Referee: Javier Alberola Rojas

4 June 2023 38	Espanyol	3–3	Almería	Cornellà de Llobregat
21:00 CEST (UTC+2)	Puado 13'; Oliván (yellow card) 30'; Montes (yellow card) 41'; Pierre-Gabriel 49'; Koleosho 73'	Report	Touré 10'; Pozo (yellow card) 30'; Costa (yellow card) 45'; Embarba 58', 87' (pen.); Ramazani (yellow card) 83'; Melero (yellow card) 90+3'	Stadium: RCDE Stadium; Attendance: 14,213; Referee: César Soto Grado

=== Copa del Rey ===
13 November 2022 First round	Arenteiro	2–0	Almería	O Carballiño
21:00 CET (UTC+1)	Escobar 4'; Mella 79'	Report	Costa (yellow card) 43'; Chumi (yellow card) 53'; Guedes (yellow card) 58'; Touré (red card) 90'	Stadium: Espiñedo; Referee: Juan Luis Pulido Santana
