= 2020–21 UD Almería season =

UD Almería
2020–21 season
- Owner: Turki Al-Sheikh
- President: Turki Al-Sheikh
- Head coach: José Manuel Gomes
- Stadium: Juegos Mediterráneos
- Segunda División: 4th
- Play-offs: Semi-finals
- Copa del Rey: Quarter-finals
- Top goalscorer: League: Umar Sadiq (20); All: Umar Sadiq (22)
Home colours	Away colours

The 2020–21 UD Almería season was the club's 31st season in existence and the club's sixth consecutive season in the second division of Spanish football. In addition to the domestic league, Almería participated in this season's edition of the Copa del Rey. The season covered the period from 17 August 2020 to 30 June 2021.

== Squad ==
As of 6 June 2021

No.	Name	Pos.	Nat.	Place of birth	Date of birth (age)	Club caps	Club goals	Int. caps	Int. goals	Signed from	Date signed	Fee	Contract End
Goalkeepers
1	Giorgi Makaridze	GK	(Georgia (country))	Tbilisi (Soviet Union)	31 March 1990 (aged 31)	34	0	15	0	Vitória Setúbal (Portugal)	12 September 2020	Free	30 June 2022
13	Fernando (c)	GK	(Spain) (Region of Murcia)	Murcia	10 June 1990 (aged 30)	48	0	–	–	UCAM Murcia	5 July 2017	Free	30 June 2021
30	Curro Harillo	GK	(Spain) (Andalusia)	Ronda	5 May 1997 (aged 24)	0	0	–	–	Almería B	1 April 2021	Free	30 June 2021
39	Lluis Tarrés	GK	(Spain) (Catalonia)	Blanes	16 March 2001 (aged 20)	1	0	–	–	Almería B	12 August 2020	Free	—N/a
Defenders
2	Aitor Buñuel	RB	(Spain) (Navarre)	Tafalla	10 February 1998 (aged 23)	20	0	–	–	Racing Santander	15 September 2020	Free	30 June 2022
12	Álex Centelles	LB	(Spain) (Valencian Community)	Valencia	30 August 1999 (aged 21)	15	0	–	–	Valencia	2 October 2020	Free	30 June 2022
15	Sergio Akieme	LB	(Equatorial Guinea)	Madrid (Spain)	16 December 1997 (aged 23)	40	2	–	–	Barcelona	19 September 2020	Loan	30 June 2021
18	Nikola Maraš	CB	(Serbia)	Belgrade (Socialist Federal Republic of Yugoslavia)	19 December 1995 (aged 25)	71	4	2	0	Chaves (Portugal)	22 August 2020	Undisc.	30 June 2024
20	Iván Balliu	RB	(Albania)	Caldes (Spain)	1 January 1992 (aged 29)	67	1	2	0	Metz (France)	12 August 2019	Free	30 June 2021
21	Chumi	CB	(Spain) (Galicia (Spain))	A Laracha	2 March 1999 (aged 22)	16	1	–	–	Barcelona B	10 September 2020	Free	30 June 2022
24	Jorge Cuenca	CB	(Spain) (Community of Madrid)	Madrid	17 November 1999 (aged 21)	37	3	–	–	Villarreal	22 September 2020	Loan	30 June 2021
25	Ivanildo Fernandes	CB	(Portugal)	Amadora	26 March 1996 (aged 25)	17	0	–	–	Sporting (Portugal)	31 December 2020	Loan	30 June 2021
Midfielders
5	Manu Morlanes	CM	(Spain) (Aragon)	Zaragoza	12 January 1999 (aged 22)	38	1	–	–	Villarreal	7 September 2020	Loan	30 June 2021
6	César de la Hoz	CM	(Spain) (Cantabria)	Orejo	30 March 1992 (aged 29)	103	3	–	–	Betis	4 July 2018	Free	30 June 2022
8	Radosav Petrović	CM	(Serbia)	Ub (Socialist Federal Republic of Yugoslavia)	8 March 1989 (aged 32)	59	1	44	2	Sporting CP (Portugal)	19 August 2019	Undisc.	30 June 2022
10	Ager Aketxe	AM	(Spain) (Basque Country (autonomous community))	Bilbao	30 December 1993 (aged 27)	29	6	–	–	Deportivo La Coruña	7 September 2020	Free	30 June 2022
11	Brian Rodríguez	RW	(Uruguay)	Tranqueras	20 May 2000 (aged 21)	16	0	9	3	Los Angeles FC (United States)	1 February 2021	Loan	30 June 2021
14	Lucas Robertone	CM	(Argentina)	Concordia	18 March 1997 (aged 24)	31	4	–	–	Vélez Sarsfield (Argentina)	1 October 2020	€3.4M	30 June 2025
16	José Carlos Lazo	LW	(Spain) (Andalusia)	Sanlúcar	16 February 1996 (aged 25)	79	14	–	–	Getafe	20 August 2019	€ 4M	30 June 2024
17	José Corpas	RW	(Spain) (Andalusia)	Baños de la Encina	7 July 1991 (aged 29)	125	19	–	–	Marbella	3 July 2018	Free	30 June 2022
19	João Carvalho	AM/LW	(Portugal)	Castanheira de Pera	9 March 1997 (aged 24)	36	0	–	–	Nottingham Forest (England)	29 September 2020	Loan	30 June 2021
22	Samú Costa	CM	(Portugal)	Aveiro	27 November 2000 (aged 20)	40	2	–	–	Braga (Portugal)	25 July 2020	Loan	30 June 2021
23	Fran Villalba	AM	(Spain) (Valencian Community)	Valencia	11 May 1998 (aged 23)	53	5	–	–	Birmingham (England)	27 August 2020	Loan	30 June 2021
27	Dani Albiar	AM/ST	(Spain) (Region of Murcia)	Cartagena	8 January 2000 (aged 21)	4	0	–	–	Almería B	18 December 2019	Free	30 June 2021
32	Largie Ramazani	LW/RW	(Belgium)	Sint-Agatha-Berchem	27 July 2001 (aged 19)	29	5	–	–	Manchester United (England)	24 August 2020	Free	30 June 2025
Forwards
3	Jordi Escobar	ST	(Spain) (Catalonia)	Sant Cebrià	10 February 2002 (aged 19)	2	0	–	–	Valencia Mestalla	5 October 2020	Undisc.	30 June 2024
4	Guilherme Schettine	ST	(Brazil)	Gama	10 October 1995 (aged 25)	7	0	–	–	Braga (Portugal)	1 February 2021	Loan	30 June 2021
7	Juan Villar	ST/RW	(Spain) (Andalusia)	Cortegana	19 May 1988 (aged 33)	32	3	–	–	Osasuna	9 July 2019	€400K	30 June 2023
9	Umar Sadiq	ST	(Nigeria)	Kaduna	2 February 1997 (aged 24)	43	22	–	–	Partizan (Serbia)	5 October 2020	€5M	30 June 2025
34	Juan Manuel Gutiérrez	ST/LW	(Uruguay)	Atlántida	2 February 1997 (aged 24)	0	0	–	–	Danubio (Uruguay)	13 September 2020	€3M	30 June 2025

== Transfers ==
=== In ===
No.	Pos.	Nat.	Name	Age	EU	Moving from	Type	Transfer window	Ends	Transfer fee	Source
—	GK	(Spain)	René Román	36	EU	Ponferradina	Loan return	Summer	2021	Free	
—	GK	(Serbia)	Dragan Rosić	23	EU	Celta B	Loan return	Summer	2024	Free	
—	DF	(France)	Mathieu Peybernes	29	EU	Lugo	Loan return	Summer	2022	Free	
—	MF	(Spain)	Chema	22	EU	Albacete	Loan return	Summer	2021	Free	
—	MF	(Spain)	Mario Abenza	24	EU	Sanluqueño	Loan return	Summer	2021	Free	
—	MF	(France)	Yanis Rahmani	25	EU	Lugo	Loan return	Summer	2021	Free	
18	DF	(Serbia)	Nikola Maraš	24	EU	Chaves (Portugal)	Transfer	Summer	2024	Undisclosed	UD Almería
—	MF	(Belgium)	Largie Ramazani	19	EU	Manchester United (England)	Transfer	Summer	2025	Free	UD Almería
10	MF	(Spain)	Fran Villalba	22	EU	Birmingham City (England)	Loan	Summer	2021	Free	UD Almería

Total spending: ▼€0

=== Out ===
No.	Pos.	Nat.	Name	Age	EU	Moving to	Type	Transfer window	Transfer fee	Source
1	GK	(Spain)	Antonio Sivera	24	EU	Alavés	Loan return	Summer	Free	
2	DF	(Spain)	Francis Guerrero	24	EU	Betis	Loan return	Summer	Free	
7	MF	(France)	Enzo Fernández	25	EU	Aves (Portugal)	Loan return	Summer	Free	
10	MF	(Spain)	Fran Villalba	22	EU	Birmingham City (England)	Loan return	Summer	Free	
11	FW	(Spain)	Juan Muñoz	24	EU	Leganés	Loan return	Summer	Free	
14	MF	(Spain)	Wilfrid Kaptoum	24	EU	Betis	Loan return	Summer	Free	
19	MF	(Croatia)	Ante Ćorić	23	EU	Roma (Italy)	Loan return	Summer	Free	
22	DF	(Nigeria)	Valentine Ozornwafor	21	EU	Galatasaray (Turkey)	Loan return	Summer	Free	
24	DF	(Spain)	David Costas	25	EU	Celta	Loan return	Summer	Free	
36	FW	(Spain)	Iván Barbero	21	EU	Osasuna	Loan return	Summer	Free	
30	GK	(Spain)	Jero Lario	25	EU	Logroñés	Loan	Summer	Free	UD Almería

Total gaining: ▲€0

Balance

Total: ▼€1,000,000

== Pre-season and friendlies ==
Win Draw Loss Fixtures

2 September 2020 Friendly	Real Betis	2–0	Almería	Marbella, Spain
19:30 CEST (UTC+2)	Bartra 28'; Ruibal 90+2'	Report		Stadium: Estadio Municipal de Marbella; Attendance: 0 Referee: Alejandro Ruiz Aguilera

5 September 2020 Friendly	Espanyol	4–0	Almería	San Pedro de Alcántara, Spain
10:00 CEST (UTC+2)	De Tomás 43'; Wu Lei 55'; Darder 62'; Campuzano 67'	Report		Stadium: Marbella Football Center; Attendance: 0 Referee: Juan Peña Varela

9 September 2020 Friendly	Cádiz	1–1	Almería	San Pedro de Alcántara, Spain
19:30 CEST (UTC+2)	Negredo 44' (pen.)	Report	Albiar 54'	Stadium: Marbella Football Center; Attendance: 0 Referee: Alejandro Ruiz Aguilera

== Competitions ==
=== Overview ===
Competition	First match	Last match	Starting round	Final position	Record							
Competition	First match	Last match	Starting round	Final position	Pld	W	D	L	GF	GA	GD	Win %
Segunda División	13 September 2020	30 May 2021	Matchday 1	4th	42	21	10	11	61	40	+21	50.00
Segunda División promotion play-offs	2 June 2021	5 June 2021	Semi-finals	Semi-finals	2	0	1	1	0	3	−3	0.00
Copa del Rey	16 December 2020	2 February 2021	First round	Quarter-finals	5	3	1	1	11	3	+8	60.00
Total					49	24	12	13	72	46	+26	48.98

Last updated: 5 June 2021
Source: Soccerway

=== Segunda División ===
==== League table ====
Pos	Team	Pld	W	D	L	GF	GA	GD	Pts	Promotion, qualification or relegation
2	Mallorca (P)	42	24	10	8	54	28	+26	82 (Note: Head-to-head points: Espanyol: 4, Mallorca: 1)	Promotion to La Liga
3	Leganés	42	21	10	11	51	32	+19	73 (Note: Head-to-head points: Leganés: 4, Almería: 1)	Qualification for promotion play-offs
4	Almería	42	21	10	11	61	40	+21	73	Qualification for promotion play-offs
5	Girona	42	20	11	11	47	36	+11	71	Qualification for promotion play-offs
6	Rayo Vallecano (O, P)	42	19	10	13	52	40	+12	67	Qualification for promotion play-offs

Source: LaLiga
Rules for classification: 1) points; 2) head-to-head points; 3) head-to-head goal difference; 4) goal difference; 5) number of goals scored
(O) Play-off winners; (P) Promoted

==== Results summary ====
Overall								Home						Away					
Pld	W	D	L	GF	GA	GD	Pts	W	D	L	GF	GA	GD	W	D	L	GF	GA	GD
42	21	10	11	61	40	+21	73	10	8	3	34	18	+16	11	2	8	27	22	+5

Last updated: 30 May 2021.
Source: La Liga

==== Results by round ====
Round	1	2	3	4	5	6	7	8	9	10	11	12	13	14	15	16	17	18	19	20	21	22	23	24	25	26	27	28	29	30	31	32	33	34	35	36	37	38	39	40	41	42
Ground	A	H	A	A	H	H	A	H	A	A	H	A	H	A	H	A	H	H	A	H	H	H	A	H	A	A	H	A	H	A	H	A	H	A	H	A	H	A	H	A	H	A
Result	W	L	L	L	D	W	W	D	W	W	W	W	W	W	L	W	W	W	L	W	D	W	D	W	L	L	L	W	D	L	D	W	L	L	D	D	D	W	D	L	W	W
Position	12	17	12	15	18	21	20	18	14	9	5	5	5	3	3	3	3	3	3	3	3	3	3	3	3	3	3	2	2	3	3	3	3	3	3	3	3	3	3	4	4	4

Updated to match(es) played on 30 May 2021. Source: La Liga
A = Away; H = Home; W = Win; D = Draw; L = Loss

==== Matches ====
The league fixtures were announced on 31 August 2020.

27 September 2020 3	Lugo	0–2	Almería	Lugo
12:00 CEST (UTC+2)		Report	Akieme 8', (yellow card) 50' (yellow-red card) 58'; Aketxe 12'; Costa (yellow card) 26'; Lazo (yellow card) 71'	Stadium: Estadio Anxo Carro; Attendance: 0 (Note: The match was played behind closed doors due to the COVID-19 pandemic in Spain.); Referee: Aitor Gorostegui Fernández Ortega

4 October 2020 4	Almería	0–1	Sporting Gijón	Almería
18:15 CEST (UTC+2)		Report	Pablo García (yellow card) 39'; Díaz (yellow card) 49'; López (yellow card) 56'; Čumić (yellow card) 67'; Đurđević 74'; Manu García (yellow card) 76'; Milovanov (yellow card) 81'	Stadium: Estadio de los Juegos Mediterráneos; Attendance: 0 Referee: Rubén Ávalos Barrera

10 October 2020 5	UD Logroñés	1–0	Almería	Logroño
16:00 CEST (UTC+2)	Andy 78'	Report	Balliu (yellow card) 31'; Villalba (yellow card) 45+3'; Costa (yellow card) 62'	Stadium: Estadio Las Gaunas; Attendance: 0 Referee: Oliver De La Fuente Ramos

17 October 2020 6	Las Palmas	2–0	Almería	Las Palmas
18:15 CEST (UTC+2)	Araujo 7', 76'; Lemos (yellow card) 14'; Pejiño (yellow card) 28'; Iemello (yellow card) 90+3'	Report	Carvalho (yellow card) 55'; Aketxe (yellow card) 62'; Balliu (yellow card) 65'	Stadium: Estadio Gran Canaria; Attendance: 0 Referee: Iñaki Bikandi Garrido

21 October 2020 7	Almería	1–1	Cartagena	Almería
21:30 CEST (UTC+2)	Maraš (yellow card) 14'; De la Hoz (yellow card) 35'; Balliu (yellow card) 61'; Sadiq 65'	Report	Castro 17'; Forniés (yellow card) 62'	Stadium: Estadio de los Juegos Mediterráneos; Attendance: 0 Referee: David Gálvez Rascón

24 October 2020 8	Almería	3–0	Fuenlabrada	Almería
20:30 CEST (UTC+2)	Morlanes (yellow card) 2'; Corpas 42', 64', 76' (pen.)	Report	Ciss (yellow card) 22' (yellow-red card) 74'; Antonio Cristian (yellow card) 54'; Diéguez (yellow card) 69'; Sotillos (yellow card) 90+1'	Stadium: Estadio de los Juegos Mediterráneos; Attendance: 0 Referee: Saúl Ais Reig

28 October 2020 9	Castellón	1–2	Almería	Castellón de la Plana
19:00 CET (UTC+1)	Jorge Fernández 61'; Gálvez (yellow card) 90'; Mateu (red card) 90'	Report	Corpas 43'; Villalba 47'; Costa (yellow card) 50'; Lazo (yellow card) 81'; Sadiq (yellow card) 90+5'; Petrović (yellow card) 90+5'	Stadium: Nou Estadi Castàlia; Attendance: 0 Referee: Eduardo Prieto Iglesias

1 November 2020 10	Almería	0–0	Girona	Almería
21:00 CET (UTC+1)	Costa (yellow card) 35'; Ramazani (yellow card) 90+6'	Report	Ramalho (red card) 28'; Juan Carlos (yellow card) 70'; Cristóforo (red card) 78'; Monchu (red card) 82'; Bustos (yellow card) 90+6'	Stadium: Estadio de los Juegos Mediterráneos; Attendance: 0 Referee: Dámaso Arcediano Monescillo

5 November 2020 1	Sabadell	1–2	Almería	Sabadell
19:00 CET (UTC+1)	Édgar Hernández (yellow card) 17'; Undabarrena (yellow card) 34'; Stoichkov 39'; Grego (yellow card) 53'; Coch (yellow card) 60'; Pena (yellow card) 85'	Report	Aketxe 13' (pen.); Centelles (yellow card) 22'; Peybernes (yellow card) 39' (yellow-red card) 41'; De la Hoz (yellow card) 57'; Balliu (yellow card) 65'; Ramazani (yellow card) 70' (goal) 90+3'; Buñuel (yellow card) 73'	Stadium: Nova Creu Alta; Attendance: 0 Referee: Iosu Galech Apezteguía

8 November 2020 11	Rayo Vallecano	0–1	Almería	Madrid
16:00 CET (UTC+1)	Advíncula (red card) 27'; Andrés Martín (yellow card) 55'; Velázquez (yellow card) 74'; Comesaña (yellow card) 82'	Report	Akieme (yellow card) 50'; Villalba (yellow card) 60'; Sadiq (yellow card) 61' (yellow-red card) 79'; Cuenca 90+5'	Stadium: Vallecas; Attendance: 0 Referee: Javier Iglesias Villanueva

14 November 2020 12	Almería	2–1	Mirandés	Almería
16:15 CET (UTC+1)	Villalba 17'; Sadiq 45+1'; Petrović (yellow card) 90'	Report	Martínez 42', (yellow card) 66'; Gómez (yellow card) 57'; Muñoz (yellow card) 80'; Vivian (yellow card) 89'	Stadium: Estadio de los Juegos Mediterráneos; Attendance: 0 Referee: Rafael Sánchez López

23 November 2020 13	Albacete	1–2	Almería	Albacete
21:00 CET (UTC+1)	Gorosito (yellow card) 15'; Boyomo (yellow card) 53'; Azamoum (yellow card) 70'; Álvaro Jiménez 78' (pen.), (yellow card) 83'; Nadal (yellow card) 90+6'	Report	Corpas 16' (pen.); Cuenca (yellow card) 26', (goal) 84'; Morlanes (yellow card) 34'; Makaridze (yellow card) 77'; Costa (yellow card) 82'; Balliu (yellow card) 87'; Akieme (yellow card) 90+1'; Ramazani (yellow card) 90+2'	Stadium: Carlos Belmonte; Attendance: 0 Referee: Juan Luis Pulido Santana

26 November 2020 14	Almería	2–0	Tenerife	Almería
21:30 CET (UTC+1)	Robertone (yellow card) 31'; Lazo 51' (pen.); Corpas (yellow card) 71'; Sadiq 75' (pen.)	Report	Folch (yellow card) 40'; Wilson (yellow card) 48'; Santana (yellow card) 49'	Stadium: Estadio de los Juegos Mediterráneos; Attendance: 0 Referee: Álvaro Moreno Aragón

30 November 2020 15	Oviedo	1–2	Almería	Oviedo
21:00 CET (UTC+1)	Blanco 65'; Arribas (yellow card) 74'; Nieto (yellow card) 74'; Sánchez (yellow card) 86'	Report	Corpas 27' (pen.), 79'; Costa (yellow card) 57'; Akieme (yellow card) 90+2'; Lazo (yellow card) 90+4'	Stadium: Carlos Tartiere; Attendance: 0 Referee: David Gálvez Rascón

3 December 2020 16	Almería	0–1	Mallorca	Almería
19:00 CET (UTC+1)	Chumi (yellow card) 5'; Sadiq (yellow card) 21'; De la Hoz (yellow card) 25'; Centelles (yellow card) 51'; Corpas (yellow card) 90+6'	Report	Sánchez (yellow card) 36'; Mohammed (yellow card) 39'; De Galarreta (yellow card) 87'; Prats 90+1'	Stadium: Estadio de los Juegos Mediterráneos; Attendance: 0 Referee: Alejandro Muñiz Ruiz

6 December 2020 17	Alcorcón	0–1	Almería	Alcorcón
14:00 CET (UTC+1)		Report	Corpas (yellow card) 46'; Sadiq 59'; Costa (yellow card) 72'; Makaridze (yellow card) 83'	Stadium: Santo Domingo; Attendance: 0 Referee: José Antonio López Toca

9 December 2020 2	Almería	1–0	Zaragoza	Almería
19:00 CET (UTC+1)	Sadiq 59' (yellow card) 70'; Centelles (yellow card) 64'; Buñuel (yellow card) 90+1'	Report	Azón (yellow card) 36'; Chavarría (yellow card) 42'; Francés (yellow card) 77'	Stadium: Estadio de los Juegos Mediterráneos; Attendance: 0 Referee: Aitor Gorostegui Fernández Ortega

13 December 2020 18	Almería	3–1	Málaga	Almería
16:00 CET (UTC+1)	Sadiq 11'; Aketxe (yellow card) 15'; Maraš (yellow card) 22' (goal) 78'; Corpas (yellow card) 60'; Ramazani (yellow card) 70', (goal) 90+3'; Balliu (yellow card) 85'; Petrović (yellow card) 88'; Cuenca (yellow card) 90+2'	Report	Muñoz 45+3'; Mejías (yellow card) 60'; Chavarría (yellow card) 80'	Stadium: Estadio de los Juegos Mediterráneos; Attendance: 0 Referee: Daniel Jesús Trujillo Suárez

20 December 2020 19	Espanyol	2–1	Almería	Cornellà de Llobregat
16:00 CET (UTC+1)	De Tomás 9', 84' (pen.); Darder (yellow card) 25'	Report	Balliu (yellow card) 43'; Corpas 51' (pen.), (yellow card) 83'	Stadium: RCDE Stadium; Attendance: 0 Referee: Miguel Ángel Ortiz Arias

3 January 2021 20	Almería	3–1	Ponferradina	Almería
20:30 CET (UTC+1)	Sadiq 2', 21', 29'; Maraš (yellow card) 45'; Akieme (red card) 76'; Petrović (yellow card) 83'	Report	Morán (yellow card) 58'; Sánchez 82'	Stadium: Estadio de los Juegos Mediterráneos; Attendance: 0 Referee: Eduardo Prieto Iglesias

24 January 2021 22	Almería	2–2	Sabadell	Almería
14:00 CET (UTC+1)	Fernandes (yellow card) 23'; Costa 38', (yellow card) 90+4'; Sadiq 76'	Report	Cornud (yellow card) 36'; Rubio 66'; Juan Hernández 84'	Stadium: Estadio de los Juegos Mediterráneos; Attendance: 0 Referee: Daniel Ocón Arráiz

30 January 2021 23	Almería	3–1	Castellón	Almería
21:00 CET (UTC+1)	Corpas 26'; Sadiq 78'; Cuenca 80'	Report	Jamelli 61'; Gálvez (yellow card) 87'	Stadium: Estadio de los Juegos Mediterráneos; Attendance: 0 Referee: Iñaki Vicandi Garrido

6 February 2021 24	Fuenlabrada	1–1	Almería	Fuenlabrada
20:30 CET (UTC+1)	Pulido (yellow card) 28'; Cristóbal (yellow card) 65'; Nteka 83'	Report	Balliu (yellow card) 24'; Sadiq (yellow card) 30' (yellow-red card) 53'; Costa (yellow card) 87'; Villalba 89'	Stadium: Fernando Torres; Attendance: 0 Referee: Gorka Sagues Oscoz

14 February 2021 25	Almería	3–1	Las Palmas	Almería
16:00 CET (UTC+1)	Fernandes (yellow card) 20'; Costa (yellow card) 26'; Juan Villar (yellow card) 28', (goal) 45+2' (pen.), 48'; Robertone (yellow card) 43'; Akieme 54'	Report	Mújica 53'; Castellano (yellow card) 72'	Stadium: Estadio de los Juegos Mediterráneos; Attendance: 0 Referee: Jon Ander González Esteban

17 February 2021 21	Leganés	2–1	Almería	Leganés
19:00 CET (UTC+1)	Bastón 48'; Omeruo 90+5'	Report	Sadiq 8'; Centelles (yellow card) 35'; Ramazani (yellow card) 41'; Petrović (yellow card) 52'	Stadium: Butarque; Attendance: 0 Referee: Javier Iglesias Villanueva

21 February 2021 26	Mallorca	2–0	Almería	Palma de Mallorca
16:00 CET (UTC+1)	De Galarreta (yellow card) 31'; Prats 44' (pen.); Sevilla 69', (yellow card) 80'; Oliván (yellow card) 90+2'; Mohammed (yellow card) 90+4'	Report	Maraš (yellow card) 43'; Makaridze (yellow card) 44'; Balliu (yellow card) 45+1'; Costa (yellow card) 50'; Villar (yellow card) 63'	Stadium: Visit Mallorca Stadium; Attendance: 0 Referee: Miguel Ángel Ortiz Arias

27 February 2021 27	Almería	4–1	Lugo	Almería
18:15 CET (UTC+1)	Sadiq 11'; Fernandes (yellow card) 41'; Lazo 48'; Corpas 69', 75'; Balliu (yellow card) 85'	Report	Barreiro 41' (pen.)	Stadium: Estadio de los Juegos Mediterráneos; Attendance: 0 Referee: Dámaso Arcediano Monescillo

7 March 2021 28	Girona	0–1	Almería	Girona
21:00 CET (UTC+1)	Terrats (yellow card) 49'; Espinosa (red card) 90+4'	Report	Costa (yellow card) 27'; Morlanes (yellow card) 50'; Sadiq 72'; Villar (yellow card) 90+4'; Maraš (yellow card) 90+7'	Stadium: Estadi Municipal de Montilivi; Attendance: 0 Referee: Javier Iglesias Villanueva

15 March 2021 29	Almería	0–0	Alcorcón	Almeria
19:00 CET (UTC+1)	Balliu (yellow card) 56'; Villar (yellow card) 90'; Sadiq (yellow card) 90+1'	Report	José León (yellow card) 77'; Castro (yellow card) 90+1'	Stadium: Estadio de los Juegos Mediterráneos; Attendance: 0 Referee: Oliver De La Fuente

21 March 2021 30	Ponferradina	2–1	Almería	Ponferrada
14:00 CET (UTC+1)	Yuri (yellow card) 32' (goal) 60'; Amo (yellow card) 46'; Morán (yellow card) 75'; Delgado 90'	Report	Villalba (yellow card) 16'; Cuenca (yellow card) 39'; Costa 41'; Carvalho (yellow card) 48'; Makaridze (yellow card) 83'; Schettine (yellow card) 84'	Stadium: El Toralín; Attendance: 0 Referee: Iosu Galech Apezteguia

27 March 2021 31	Almería	1–1	Leganés	Almeria
18:15 CET (UTC+1)	Fernandes (yellow card) 2'; Morlanes (yellow card) 90+1', (goal) 90+2'; Maraš (yellow card) 90+8'	Report	Pérez (red card) 16'; Sergio González (yellow card) 45+1'; Omeruo (yellow card) 73'; Riesgo (yellow card) 90+1'; Muñoz 90+10' (pen.)	Stadium: Estadio de los Juegos Mediterráneos; Attendance: 0 Referee: José Antonio López Toca

30 March 2021 32	Málaga	0–3	Almería	Málaga
19:30 CET (UTC+1)	Mejías (yellow card) 36'	Report	Robertone 12'; Lazo 29'; Makaridze (yellow card) 73'; Sadiq 77'	Stadium: Estadio La Rosaleda; Attendance: 0 Referee: Rubén Ávalos Barrera

2 April 2021 33	Almería	0–1	Rayo Vallecano	Almeria
21:00 CET (UTC+1)	Robertone (yellow card) 31'; Morlanes (yellow card) 33'; Fernandes (yellow card) 54' (yellow-red card) 70'; Corpas (yellow card) 56'; Balliu (yellow card) 59'	Report	Catena (yellow card) 26'; Antoñín (yellow card) 44'; Valentín (yellow card) 49'; Á. García (yellow card) 86'; Bebé 89'	Stadium: Estadio de los Juegos Mediterráneos; Attendance: 0 Referee: Alejandro Muñíz Ruiz

11 April 2021 34	Zaragoza	2–1	Almería	Zaragoza
16:00 CET (UTC+1)	Adrián 10'; Carlos Nieto (yellow card) 18'; Azón 80'; Chavarría (yellow card) 84'	Report	Costa (yellow card) 17'; Robertone (yellow card) 32', (goal) 34'; Balliu (yellow card) 57'; Petrović (yellow card) 59'; Corpas (yellow card) 84' (yellow-red card) 90+4'	Stadium: Estadio La Romareda; Attendance: 0 Referee: Miguel Ángel Ortiz Arias

19 April 2021 35	Almería	1–1	Espanyol	Almería
21:00 CEST (UTC+2)	Sadiq 50'; Makaridze (yellow card) 71'	Report	Dimata 58'; De Tomás (penalty missed) 69'; Darder (yellow card) 74'	Stadium: Estadio de los Juegos Mediterráneos; Attendance: 0 Referee: David Gálvez Rascón

25 April 2021 36	Mirandés	1–1	Almería	Miranda de Ebro
16:00 CEST (UTC+2)	Berrocal 12', (yellow card) 48'; Martínez (yellow card) 35'	Report	Robertone (yellow card) 21'; Corpas 37' (pen.); Costa (yellow card) 41'; Fernandes (yellow card) 53'; Cuenca (yellow card) 78'; Akieme (yellow card) 90+4'	Stadium: Estadio Municipal de Anduva; Attendance: 0 Referee: Francisco José Hernández Maeso

1 May 2021 37	Almería	2–2	Oviedo	Almería
18:15 CEST (UTC+2)	Corpas (penalty missed) 17'; Sadiq 22' (pen.), 30'	Report	Obeng 54'; Grippo 83'	Stadium: Estadio de los Juegos Mediterráneos; Attendance: 0 Referee: Saúl Ais Reig

7 May 2021 38	Tenerife	0–1	Almería	Santa Cruz de Tenerife
21:00 CEST (UTC+2)	Alberto (red card) 41'; Moore (yellow card) 73'; Pomares (yellow card) 80'; González (yellow card) 84'	Report	Robertone (yellow card) 53'; Maraš (yellow card) 59'; Ramazani 69'	Stadium: Heliodoro Rodríguez López; Attendance: 0 Referee: Álvaro Moreno Aragón

15 May 2021 39	Almería	1–1	Albacete	Almería
21:00 CEST (UTC+2)	Lazo 28', (yellow card) 43'; Akieme (yellow card) 90'	Report	Ortuño 19'; Jiménez (yellow card) 23'; Peña (red card) 69'; Noguerol (yellow card) 70'; Kecojević (yellow card) 72'; Isaac (yellow card) 90+3'; Bernabé (yellow card) 90+5'; Torres (yellow card) 90+7'	Stadium: Estadio de los Juegos Mediterráneos; Attendance: 0 Referee: Miguel Ángel Ortiz Arias

18 May 2021 40	Cartagena	3–2	Almería	Cartagena
19:00 CEST (UTC+2)	Delmás (yellow card) 21'; José Ángel (yellow card) 25'; Castro 41', 47'; Navas (yellow card) 66'; De Blasis 82' (pen.), (yellow card) 83'; Elady (yellow card) 90+3'	Report	Costa (yellow card) 36'; Sadiq 45+1'; Ramazani 54' (pen.), (yellow card) 76'; Makaridze (yellow card) 81'	Stadium: Cartagonova; Attendance: 0 Referee: Javier Iglesias Villanueva

24 May 2021 41	Almería	2–1	UD Logroñés	Almería
21:00 CEST (UTC+2)	Sadiq 2', (penalty missed) 45'; Chumi 27'	Report	López (yellow card) 44'; Acevedo 68'; Sierra (yellow card) 70'	Stadium: Estadio de los Juegos Mediterráneos; Attendance: 0 Referee: Francisco José Hernández Maeso

30 May 2021 42	Sporting Gijón	0–2	Almería	Gijón
21:00 CEST (UTC+2)		Report	Aketxe 56', 71'	Stadium: El Molinón; Attendance: 0 Referee: Eduardo Prieto Iglesias

==== Promotion play-offs ====
2 June 2021 SF First leg	Girona	3–0	Almería	Girona
21:00 CEST (UTC+2)	Bárcenas 3'; Couto 5'; Juanpe (yellow card) 52'; Franquesa (yellow card) 54'; Sylla 65'	Report	Balliu (yellow card) 27'; Ramazani (yellow card) 30'; Makaridze (yellow card) 85'	Stadium: Montilivi; Attendance: 0 Referee: Alejandro Muñiz Ruiz

5 June 2021 SF Second leg	Almería	0–0 (0–3 agg.)	Girona	Almería
21:00 CEST (UTC+2)	Fernandes (yellow card) 39'; Buñuel (yellow card) 43'; Robertone (yellow card) 52'; Costa (yellow card) 56'	Report	Kebe (yellow card) 67'; Sylla (yellow card) 89'	Stadium: Estadio de los Juegos Mediterráneos; Attendance: 0 Referee: Miguel Ángel Ortiz Arias

=== Copa del Rey ===
16 December 2020 First round	L'Hospitalet	1–4	Almería	L'Hospitalet de Llobregat
18:00 CET (UTC+1)	Carmona 46'	Report	Appiah 26'; Diego 39' (o.g.); Ramazani 89'; Aketxe 90+2'	Stadium: Estadi Municipal de Futbol de L'Hospitalet; Referee: José Antonio López Toca

6 January 2021 Second round	Numancia	1–2	Almería	Soria
21:00 CET (UTC+1)	Moha (yellow card) 20'; Menudo 58' (pen.); San Emeterio (yellow card) 83'; Cotán (yellow card) 90+3'	Report	Petrović (yellow card) 38'; Robertone 44', 90+1'; De la Hoz (yellow card) 45+1'; Ramazani (yellow card) 54'; Chumi (yellow card) 68'	Stadium: Los Pajaritos; Referee: Iosu Galech Apezteguía

16 January 2021 Round of 32	Almería	5–0	Alavés	Almería
12:00 CET (UTC+1)	Sadiq 8', 45+1', (yellow card) 70'; Costa (yellow card) 37'; Corpas (yellow card) 42'; Aketxe 45'; Battaglia 52' (o.g.); Villar 81' (pen.)	Report	Pina (red card) 35'	Stadium: Juegos Mediterráneos; Referee: Javier Alberola Rojas

27 January 2021 Round of 16	Almería	0–0 (a.e.t.) (5–4 p)	Osasuna	Almería
21:00 CET (UTC+1)	Fernandes (yellow card) 116'	Report	D. García (yellow card) 68'; Vidal (yellow card) 72'; Oier (yellow card) 119'	Stadium: Juegos Mediterráneos; Referee: Santiago Jaime Latre
	Penalties
	Akieme (penalty scored); Corpas (penalty missed); Sadiq (penalty scored); Ramazani (penalty scored); De la Hoz (penalty scored); Carvalho (penalty scored)		(penalty scored) Torres; (penalty scored) Moncayola; (penalty scored) Calleri; (penalty missed) Sánchez; (penalty scored) Barja; (penalty missed) D. García

2 February 2021 Quarter-finals	Almería	0–1	Sevilla	Almería
21:00 CET (UTC+1)	Corpas (yellow card) 69'; Chumi (yellow card) 81'	Report	Ocampos 67'	Stadium: Juegos Mediterráneos; Referee: Xavier Estrada Fernández

== Player statistics ==
=== Appearances and goals ===
As of 6 June 2021

No.	Pos	Nat	Player	Total		Segunda División		Copa del Rey		Play-offs	
No.	Pos	Nat	Player	Apps	Goals	Apps	Goals	Apps	Goals	Apps	Goals
Goalkeepers
1	GK	(Spain) ESP	Giorgi Makaridze	34	0	32	0	1	0	1	0
13	GK	(Spain) ESP	Fernando	14	0	10+1	0	2	0	1	0
30	GK	(Spain) ESP	Curro Harillo	0	0	0	0	0	0	0	0
39	GK	(Spain) ESP	Lluis Tarrés	1	0	0	0	1	0	0	0
Defenders
2	DF	(Spain) ESP	Aitor Buñuel	19	0	12+3	0	3	0	1	0
12	DF	(Spain) ESP	Álex Centelles	15	0	11+2	0	1	0	1	0
15	DF	(Equatorial Guinea) GEQ	Sergio Akieme	39	2	31+3	2	3	0	1+1	0
18	DF	(Serbia) SRB	Nikola Maraš	31	1	28+2	1	0	0	1	0
20	DF	(Albania) ALB	Iván Balliu	35	0	30+2	0	1	0	1+1	0
21	DF	(Spain) ESP	Chumi	15	1	9+1	1	3	0	2	0
24	DF	(Spain) ESP	Jorge Cuenca	36	3	30+5	3	1	0	0	0
25	DF	(Portugal) POR	Ivanildo Fernandes	17	0	12+2	0	0+2	0	1	0
Midfielders
5	MF	(Spain) ESP	Manu Morlanes	38	1	30+5	1	1	0	2	0
6	MF	(Spain) ESP	César de la Hoz	25	0	12+9	0	3	0	1	0
8	MF	(Serbia) SRB	Radosav Petrović	30	0	10+17	0	2+1	0	0	0
10	MF	(Spain) ESP	Ager Aketxe	29	6	20+5	4	1+1	2	1+1	0
11	MF	(Uruguay) URU	Brian Rodríguez	16	0	5+11	0	0	0	0	0
14	MF	(Argentina) ARG	Lucas Robertone	30	4	14+11	2	3+1	2	0+1	0
16	MF	(Spain) ESP	José Carlos Lazo	41	4	22+14	4	1+2	0	1+1	0
17	MF	(Spain) ESP	José Corpas	44	12	24+15	12	1+2	0	0+2	0
19	MF	(Portugal) POR	João Carvalho	35	0	19+13	0	1+1	0	1	0
22	MF	(Portugal) POR	Samu Costa	39	2	32+3	2	1+1	0	1+1	0
23	MF	(Spain) ESP	Fran Villalba	34	3	17+13	3	2+2	0	0	0
27	MF	(Spain) ESP	Dani Albiar	1	0	0	0	0+1	0	0	0
32	MF	(Belgium) BEL	Largie Ramazani	28	5	7+16	4	2+1	1	2	0
Forwards
3	FW	(Spain) ESP	Jordi Escobar	2	0	0	0	2	0	0	0
4	FW	(Brazil) BRA	Guilherme Schettine	7	0	0+7	0	0	0	0	0
7	FW	(Spain) ESP	Juan Villar	31	3	7+18	2	1+3	1	1+1	0
9	FW	(Nigeria) NGR	Umar Sadiq	42	22	33+5	20	1+1	2	2	0
34	FW	(Uruguay) URU	Juan Manuel Gutiérrez	0	0	0	0	0	0	0	0
Players on loan to other clubs
4	DF	(France) FRA	Mathieu Peybernes	6	0	3+1	0	2	0	0	0
25	GK	(Serbia) SRB	Dragan Rosić	0	0	0	0	0	0	0	0
26	MF	(Spain) ESP	Francisco Callejón	0	0	0	0	0	0	0	0
30	GK	(Spain) ESP	Jero Lario	0	0	0	0	0	0	0	0
31	FW	(England) ENG	Arvin Appiah	4	1	0+1	0	2+1	1	0	0
—	DF	(Spain) ESP	Iván Martos	0	0	0	0	0	0	0	0
—	DF	(Brazil) BRA	Jonathan	0	0	0	0	0	0	0	0
—	DF	(Spain) ESP	Juan Ibiza	0	0	0	0	0	0	0	0
—	MF	(Spain) ESP	Sergio Aguza	0	0	0	0	0	0	0	0
—	MF	(Argentina) ARG	Valentín Vada	0	0	0	0	0	0	0	0
—	MF	(France) FRA	Yanis Rahmani	0	0	0	0	0	0	0	0
—	FW	(Spain) ESP	Rubén Enri	0	0	0	0	0	0	0	0
Players who left the club midway through the season
11	FW	(Uruguay) URU	Cristian Olivera	4	0	0+3	0	1	0	0	0
26	FW	(Portugal) POR	Pedro Mendes	10	0	2+8	0	0	0	0	0

=== Top scorers ===
Place	Position	Nation	Number	Name	Segunda División	Copa del Rey	Play-offs	Total
1	FW	(Nigeria)	9	Umar Sadiq	20	2	0	22
2	MF	(Spain)	17	José Corpas	12	0	0	9
3	MF	(Spain)	10	Ager Aketxe	4	2	0	6
4	MF	(Belgium)	32	Largie Ramazani	4	1	0	5
5	MF	(Spain)	16	José Carlos Lazo	4	0	0	4
5	MF	(Argentina)	14	Lucas Robertone	2	2	0	4
6	DF	(Spain)	24	Jorge Cuenca	3	0	0	3
6	MF	(Spain)	23	Fran Villalba	3	0	0	3
6	FW	(Spain)	7	Juan Villar	2	1	0	3
7	DF	(Equatorial Guinea)	15	Sergio Akieme	2	0	0	2
7	MF	(Portugal)	22	Samú Costa	2	0	0	2
8	MF	(Spain)	5	Manu Morlanes	1	0	0	1
8	DF	(Serbia)	18	Nikola Maraš	1	0	0	1
8	DF	(Spain)	21	Chumi	1	0	0	1
8	FW	(England)	31	Arvin Appiah	0	1	0	1
				Own goals	0	2	0	2
				TOTALS	61	11	0	72

=== Disciplinary record ===
Number	Nation	Position	Name	Segunda División			Copa del Rey			Play-offs			Total		
Number	Nation	Position	Name	Yellow card	(yellow card) (yellow-red card)	Red card	Yellow card	(yellow card) (yellow-red card)	Red card	Yellow card	(yellow card) (yellow-red card)	Red card	Yellow card	(yellow card) (yellow-red card)	Red card
22	(Portugal)	MF	Samú Costa	15	0	0	1	0	0	1	0	0	17	0	0
20	(Albania)	DF	Iván Balliu	13	0	0	0	0	0	1	0	0	14	0	0
9	(Nigeria)	FW	Umar Sadiq	7	2	0	1	0	0	0	0	0	8	2	0
17	(Spain)	MF	José Corpas	7	1	0	1	0	0	0	0	0	8	1	0
25	(Portugal)	DF	Ivanildo Fernandes	6	1	0	1	0	0	1	0	0	8	1	0
1	(Georgia (country))	GK	Giorgi Makaridze	7	0	0	0	0	0	1	0	0	8	0	0
32	(Belgium)	MF	Largie Ramazani	6	0	0	1	0	0	1	0	0	8	0	0
18	(Serbia)	DF	Nikola Maraš	7	0	0	0	0	0	0	0	0	7	0	0
8	(Serbia)	MF	Radosav Petrović	6	0	0	1	0	0	0	0	0	7	0	0
14	(Argentina)	MF	Lucas Robertone	6	0	0	0	0	0	1	0	0	7	0	0
15	(Equatorial Guinea)	DF	Sergio Akieme	6	1	1	0	0	0	0	0	0	6	1	1
5	(Spain)	MF	Manu Morlanes	5	0	0	0	0	0	0	0	0	5	0	0
7	(Spain)	FW	Juan Villar	4	0	0	0	0	0	0	0	0	4	0	0
12	(Spain)	DF	Álex Centelles	4	0	0	0	0	0	0	0	0	4	0	0
16	(Spain)	MF	José Carlos Lazo	4	0	0	0	0	0	0	0	0	4	0	0
24	(Spain)	DF	Jorge Cuenca	4	0	0	0	0	0	0	0	0	4	0	0
2	(Spain)	DF	Aitor Buñuel	3	0	0	0	0	0	1	0	0	4	0	0
6	(Spain)	MF	César de la Hoz	3	0	0	1	0	0	0	0	0	4	0	0
23	(Spain)	MF	Fran Villalba	3	0	0	0	0	0	0	0	0	3	0	0
10	(Spain)	MF	Ager Aketxe	2	0	0	0	0	0	0	0	0	2	0	0
19	(Portugal)	MF	João Carvalho	2	0	0	0	0	0	0	0	0	2	0	0
21	(Spain)	DF	Chumi	1	0	0	1	0	0	0	0	0	2	0	0
4	(France)	DF	Mathieu Peybernes	1	1	0	0	0	0	0	0	0	1	1	0
4	(Brazil)	FW	Guilherme Schettine	1	0	0	0	0	0	0	0	0	1	0	0
11	(Uruguay)	MF	Cristian Olivera	0	0	0	1	0	0	0	0	0	1	0	0
			TOTALS	124	6	1	9	0	0	7	0	0	140	6	1
