= Fran Villalba =

Spanish footballer (born 1998)

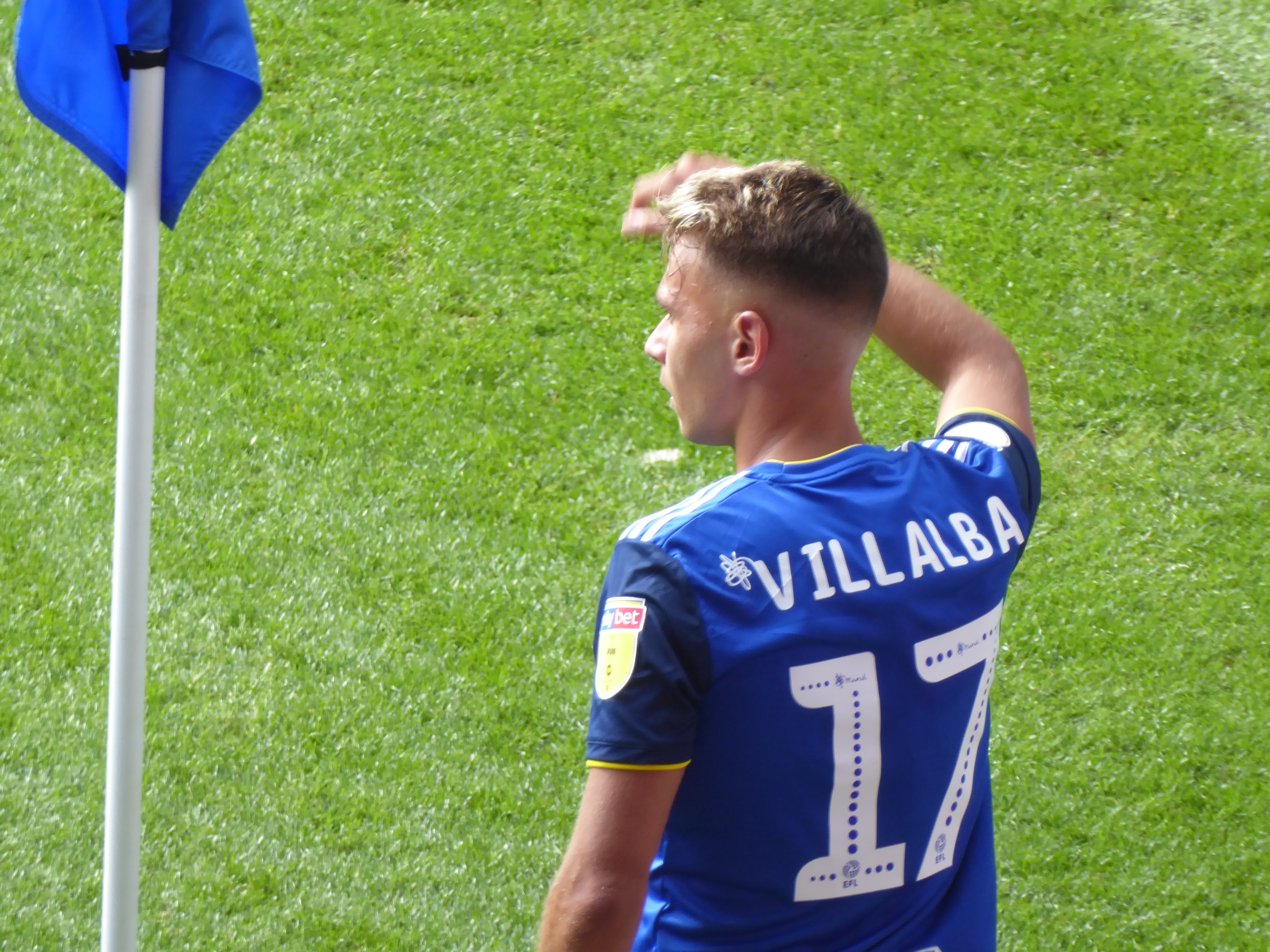
- Villalba with Birmingham City in 2019

Personal information
- Full name: Francisco José Villalba Rodrigo
- Date of birth: 11 May 1998 (age 28)
- Place of birth: Valencia, Spain
- Height: 1.68 m (5 ft 6 in)
- Position: Midfielder

Team information
- Current team: Santos Laguna
- Number: 21

Youth career
- 2011–2016: Valencia

Senior career*
Years	Team	Apps	(Gls)
2015–2018	Valencia B	80	(8)
2015–2019	Valencia	1	(0)
2018–2019	→ Numancia (loan)	39	(4)
2019–2022	Birmingham City	17	(1)
2020–2021	→ Almería (loan)	46	(5)
2021–2022	→ Sporting Gijón (loan)	38	(4)
2022–2024	Sporting Gijón	31	(0)
2022–2023	→ Málaga (loan)	34	(1)
2024–	Santos Laguna	67	(6)

International career
2014	Spain U16	2	(1)
2014–2015	Spain U17	17	(3)
2016	Spain U18	2	(0)
2016	Spain U19	2	(0)
- * Club domestic league appearances and goals as of 00:48, 27 September 2026 (UTC)

Francisco José Villalba Rodrigo (born 11 May 1998) is a Spanish footballer who plays as a midfielder for Liga MX club Santos Laguna.

He began his career with Valencia and spent a season on loan to Numancia before moving to England in 2019 to join Birmingham City. He returned to Spain in January 2020 and spent the next 18 months on loan to Almería, before joining Sporting Gijón on loan for the 2021–22 season. After the loan was made permanent, he spent the 2022–23 season on loan to Málaga and 2023–24 with his parent club. He then signed for Santos Laguna. In international football, he has represented Spain from under-16 to under-19 level.

== Club career ==
=== Valencia ===
Born in the neighbourhood of El Cabanyal, Valencia, Villalba was a Valencia CF youth graduate. On 1 August 2014, after being linked to Liverpool, he signed a new four-year deal with Los Che.

On 1 February 2015, aged only 16, Villalba made his senior debut with Valencia's reserve team, coming on as a second-half substitute in a 1–2 away loss against CD Olímpic de Xàtiva in the Segunda División B championship. He appeared in two further matches during the campaign, both from the bench.

On 26 June 2015 Villalba was called up to the main squad by manager Nuno Espírito Santo for the pre-season. He made his professional debut on 16 December, as a half-time substitute for André Gomes in a 2–0 Copa del Rey home win against Barakaldo. Villalba made his La Liga debut on 31 December 2015, coming on in the 84th minute of a 1–0 away loss against Villarreal.

On 12 July 2018 he joined Segunda División club Numancia on a season-long loan. Villalba scored his first professional goal on 16 September 2018, the equaliser in a 1–1 draw away to Sporting de Gijón, and later in the match was sent off for the first time ever.

=== Birmingham City ===
On 7 August 2019, Villalba signed a three-year contract with Birmingham City of the English Championship. He made his debut three days later in the starting eleven for a 1–1 draw with Bristol City, came close to scoring from distance, and was the Birmingham Mail's man of the match. Although he did not readily adapt to the quicker, more physical style of the English game, he was part of the starting eleven for the first four months of the season, apart from a spell out with a groin injury. He scored his first goal in a young Birmingham team that beat Middlesbrough 2–1 on 6 October – another shot was "somehow kept out ... at point blank range" – but according to the Mail, "what earned him his 76th-minute standing ovation was the tireless pressing and harrying that characterised his second period." However, with considerable competition in attacking midfield from Dan Crowley and new arrival Jérémie Bela as well as the emergence of the 16-year-old Jude Bellingham, Villalba dropped down the pecking order and out of the matchday squad. The last of his 17 appearances came in a 3–0 defeat away to Hull City on 21 December.

Villalba's contract was extended for a further year in January 2020, and he joined Almería on 27 January 2020 on loan to the end of the 2019–20 Segunda División season; the deal included an option to purchase. He scored once from five first-team appearances before football in Spain was suspended because of the COVID-19 pandemic, and once from four matches after the resumption, before his loan spell was extended to cover the remainder of the season. He finished with 18 appearances as Almería failed to secure automatic promotion and then lost to Girona in the play-off semi-final.

Villalba's loan was extended to the end of the 2020–21 season in a deal that retained the option to purchase. He made 30 league appearances as Almería again reached the play-offs and again lost to Girona in the semi-final, and the club chose not to retain his services.

=== Sporting Gijon ===
He joined another Segunda División club, Sporting Gijón, on 3 August 2021 on loan for the 2021–22 season. His first goal, from a shot that looped up off a defender and over the goalkeeper, opened the scoring in a 2–1 defeat of Leganés on 10 September that extended Sporting's unbeaten start to the season to five matches. By the end of January 2022, he had 28 appearances, mainly as a starter, four goals and four assists, and the club confirmed that it had taken up its option to purchase. Villalba signed a four-year contract to come into force on 1 July, after the expiry of his loan.

Villalba's transfer to Sporting Gijón for an undisclosed fee was finally confirmed on 24 June 2022, but on 16 August, he moved to Segunda División rivals Málaga on loan for the season. The deal included an obligation to purchase if Málaga were promoted. He supplied one goal and two assists from his 34 league appearances, and returned to his parent club at the end of the season after Málaga were relegated.

He found favour with new head coach Miguel Ángel Ramírez, and although an injury in pre-season prevented him establishing himself in the starting eleven, prompting suggestions of a possible departure on loan, although the player stated he wanted to stay. He did stay, managed 31 league appearances (14 starts), and helped his team reach the play-offs, in which they lost to Espanyol in the semi-final.

Although his priority was to become part of Sporting's squad under new coach Rubén Albés, the club had other ideas, which included reducing the wage bill. It proposed a move to a club with which it shared ownership, Santos Laguna of the Mexican top-flight Liga MX. After some days of thought, he agreed, and the transfer was completed on 8 July 2024. He made his debut on 13 July as a second-half substitute in a 1–1 draw at home to Pumas UNAM.

== Career statistics ==
As of match played on 15 March 2025

Appearances and goals by club, season and competition
Club	Season	League			National cup (Note: Includes Copa del Rey, FA Cup)		Other		Total	
Club	Season	Division	Apps	Goals	Apps	Goals	Apps	Goals	Apps	Goals
Valencia Mestalla	2014–15	Segunda División B	3	0	—		—		3	0
Valencia Mestalla	2015–16	Segunda División B	21	0	—		—		21	0
Valencia Mestalla	2016–17	Segunda División B	22	2	—		1 (Note: Appearance in Segunda División B play-offs)	0	23	2
Valencia Mestalla	2017–18	Segunda División B	34	6	—		—		34	6
Valencia Mestalla	Total		80	8	—		—		81	8
Valencia	2015–16	La Liga	1	0	3	0	0	0	4	0
Numancia (loan)	2018–19	Segunda División	39	4	1	0	—		40	4
Birmingham City	2019–20	Championship	17	1	0	0	—		17	1
Almería (loan)	2019–20	Segunda División	16	2	—		2 (Note: Appearances in Segunda División play-offs)	0	18	2
Almería (loan)	2020–21	Segunda División	30	3	5	0	—		35	3
Almería (loan)	Total		46	5	5	0	2	0	53	5
Sporting Gijón (loan)	2021–22	Segunda División	38	4	4	0	—		42	4
Sporting Gijón	2022–23	Segunda División	0	0	0	0	—		0	0
Sporting Gijón	2023–24	Segunda División	31	0	2	0	2	0	35	0
Sporting Gijón	Total		69	4	6	0	2	0	77	4
Málaga (loan)	2022–23	Segunda División	34	1	1	0	—		35	1
Santos Laguna	2024–25	Liga MX	20	1	0	0	3 (Note: Appearances in Leagues Cup)	0	23	1
Career total			306	24	16	0	8	0	330	24
