= Chumi =

Spanish footballer

Personal information
- Full name: Juan Brandáriz Movilla
- Date of birth: 2 March 1999 (age 27)
- Place of birth: A Laracha, Spain
- Height: 1.85 m (6 ft 1 in)
- Positions: Centre-back; right-back

Team information
- Current team: Almería
- Number: 21

Youth career
- Laracha
- Montañeros
- Deportivo La Coruña
- 2014–2018: Barcelona

Senior career*
| Years | Team | Apps | (Gls) |
| 2018–2020 | Barcelona B | 44 | (0) |
| 2018 | Barcelona | 0 | (0) |
| 2020– | Almería | 121 | (3) |

International career
| 2014–2015 | Spain U16 | 7 | (1) |
| 2015–2016 | Spain U17 | 12 | (1) |
| 2016 | Spain U20 | 2 | (0) |
- * Club domestic league appearances and goals as of 3 June 2026

Juan Brandáriz Movilla (born 2 March 1999), commonly known as Chumi, is a Spanish professional footballer who plays as a centre-back or right-back for Segunda Division club Almería.

== Club career ==
=== Barcelona ===
Born in A Laracha, A Coruña, Galicia, Chumi joined FC Barcelona's youth setup in 2014, from Deportivo La Coruña. In June 2018, after finishing his graduation, he was promoted to the reserves in Segunda División B.

Chumi made his senior debut on 1 September 2018, starting in a 0–1 home loss against SD Ejea. His maiden appearance for the first team came on 1 November, when he started in the 1–0 away victory over Cultural y Deportiva Leonesa for the Copa del Rey.

On 8 November 2018, Chumi renewed his contract with Barça until 2020, with a €100 million release clause. On 30 June 2020, he left the club as his contract expired.

=== Almería ===
On 10 September 2020, free agent Chumi agreed to a two-year contract with UD Almería in Segunda División. On 1 March 2022, after becoming a regular starter, he renewed his link until 2025.

On 14 July 2025, Chumi agreed to a new deal with the Rojiblancos until 2028.

== Career statistics ==
As of 25 May 2024

| Club | Season | League | | | Copa del Rey | | Europe | | Other | | Total | |
| Club | Season | Division | Apps | Goals | Apps | Goals | Apps | Goals | Apps | Goals | Apps | Goals |
|---|---|---|---|---|---|---|---|---|---|---|---|---|
| Barcelona B | 2018–19 | Segunda División B | 28 | 0 | — | | | | | | 28 | 0 |
| Barcelona B | 2019–20 | Segunda División B | 16 | 0 | — | | | | | | 16 | 0 |
| Barcelona B | Total | | 44 | 0 | — | | — | | — | | 44 | 0 |
| Barcelona | 2018–19 | La Liga | 0 | 0 | 3 | 0 | 0 | 0 | 0 | 0 | 3 | 0 |
| Barcelona | 2019–20 | La Liga | 0 | 0 | 0 | 0 | 0 | 0 | 0 | 0 | 0 | 0 |
| Barcelona | Total | | 0 | 0 | 3 | 0 | 0 | 0 | 0 | 0 | 3 | 0 |
| Almería | 2020–21 | Segunda División | 10 | 1 | 4 | 0 | — | | 2 | 0 | 16 | 1 |
| Almería | 2021–22 | Segunda División | 25 | 1 | 2 | 0 | — | | — | | 27 | 1 |
| Almería | 2022–23 | La Liga | 21 | 1 | 1 | 0 | — | | — | | 22 | 1 |
| Almería | 2023–24 | La Liga | 31 | 0 | 2 | 0 | — | | — | | 33 | 0 |
| Almería | Total | | 87 | 3 | 9 | 0 | — | | — | | 96 | 3 |
| Career total | | | 131 | 3 | 12 | 0 | 0 | 0 | 2 | 0 | 145 | 3 |

== Honours ==
=== Club ===
Barcelona

- UEFA Youth League: 2017–18

=== Spain U17 ===
- UEFA European Under-17 Championship runner-up: 2016
