= César de la Hoz =

Spanish footballer

Personal information
- Full name: César de la Hoz López
- Date of birth: 30 March 1992 (age 34)
- Place of birth: Orejo, Spain
- Height: 1.79 m (5 ft 10 in)
- Position: Midfielder

Youth career
- Racing Santander

Senior career*
| Years | Team | Apps | (Gls) |
| 2011–2013 | Racing B | 66 | (2) |
| 2012–2013 | Racing Santander | 2 | (0) |
| 2013–2014 | Barakaldo | 25 | (2) |
| 2014–2018 | Betis B | 92 | (4) |
| 2017–2018 | → Albacete (loan) | 33 | (4) |
| 2018–2023 | Almería | 160 | (4) |
| 2023–2025 | Valladolid | 23 | (0) |
| 2025 | Oviedo | 12 | (0) |
- * Club domestic league appearances and goals as of 2 June 2025

César de la Hoz López (born 30 March 1992) is a Spanish footballer who plays mainly as a midfielder.

== Club career ==
=== Early career ===
Born in Orejo, Marina de Cudeyo, Cantabria, de la Hoz was a product of Racing de Santander's youth system, and made his senior debut with the reserves in the 2011–12 season, in Tercera División. On 19 August 2012 he made his professional debut, starting in a 0–1 home defeat against UD Las Palmas, in the Segunda División championship.

On 13 July 2013, de la Hoz joined Barakaldo CF in Segunda División B. After appearing regularly he moved to fellow league team Real Betis B on 10 July 2014.

On 30 August 2017, de la Hoz was loaned to Albacete Balompié in the second division, for one year. He scored his first professional goals on 15 October, netting a brace in a 2–1 home defeat of Sevilla Atlético.

=== Almería ===
On 4 July 2018, de la Hoz signed a two-year deal with UD Almería, still in the second tier. On 6 October 2021, after establishing himself as a starter and one of the team captains, he renewed his contract until 2023; the Andalusians achieved promotion to La Liga as champions at the end of that season.

de la Hoz made his top tier debut at the age of 30 on 27 August 2022, replacing Íñigo Eguaras at half-time in a 2–1 home win over Sevilla FC. He scored his first goal in the category on 29 October, netting his team's second in a 3–1 success over RC Celta de Vigo also at the Power Horse Stadium.

On 14 June 2023, de la Hoz and teammate Francisco Portillo both left the Rojiblancos as their contracts were due to expire.

=== Valladolid ===
On 21 July 2023, de la Hoz signed a two-year contract with Real Valladolid, freshly relegated to the second division. Valladolid returned to La Liga after one season with de la Hoz's help, but he only had bench appearances in the first half of the 2024–25 La Liga season.

=== Oviedo ===
On 16 January 2025, de la Hoz joined Real Oviedo on an 18-month contract. On 12 July, after helping the club in their top tier promotion, the club exercised a clause that allowed him to leave by mutual consent.

== Honours ==
Almería

- Segunda División: 2021–22
