= Gui Guedes =

Portuguese footballer

Personal information
- Full name: Guilherme Borges Guedes
- Date of birth: 17 April 2002 (age 24)
- Place of birth: Santa Marta de Penaguião, Portugal
- Height: 1.85 m (6 ft 1 in)
- Position: Midfielder

Team information
- Current team: Almería
- Number: 8

Youth career
- 2010–2012: Santa Marta
- 2012–2021: Vitória Guimarães

Senior career*
Years	Team	Apps	(Gls)
2021–2022	Vitória Guimarães B	18	(2)
2021–2022	Vitória Guimarães	5	(0)
2022–2023	Almería B	2	(0)
2022–	Almería	35	(2)
2023	→ Lugo (loan)	13	(0)
2023–2024	→ Porto B (loan)	26	(1)

International career^{‡}
2019–2020	Portugal U18	3	(1)
2021–2022	Portugal U20	8	(1)
- * Club domestic league appearances and goals as of 3 June 2026 ‡ National team caps and goals as of 3 September 2023

Guilherme "Gui" Borges Guedes (born 17 April 2002) is a Portuguese professional footballer who plays as a midfielder for Spanish club UD Almería.

== Club career ==
A youth product of Santa Marta and Vitória Guimarães, Guedes signed his professional contract with Vitória on 1 May 2019. He made his professional debut with Vitória Guimarães in a 4–1 Taça da Liga win over Leixões on 26 July 2021.

On 23 June 2022, Guedes moved abroad and signed a six-year deal with UD Almería, recently promoted to La Liga. Initially assigned to the reserves, he made his first team debut on 13 November, starting in a 2–0 away loss against CD Arenteiro, for the season's Copa del Rey.

On 3 February 2023, Guedes was loaned to Segunda División side CD Lugo for the remainder of the campaign. On 1 September, he returned to his home country after agreeing to a one-year loan deal with FC Porto B.
