= Iván Balliu =

Albanian footballer (born 1992)

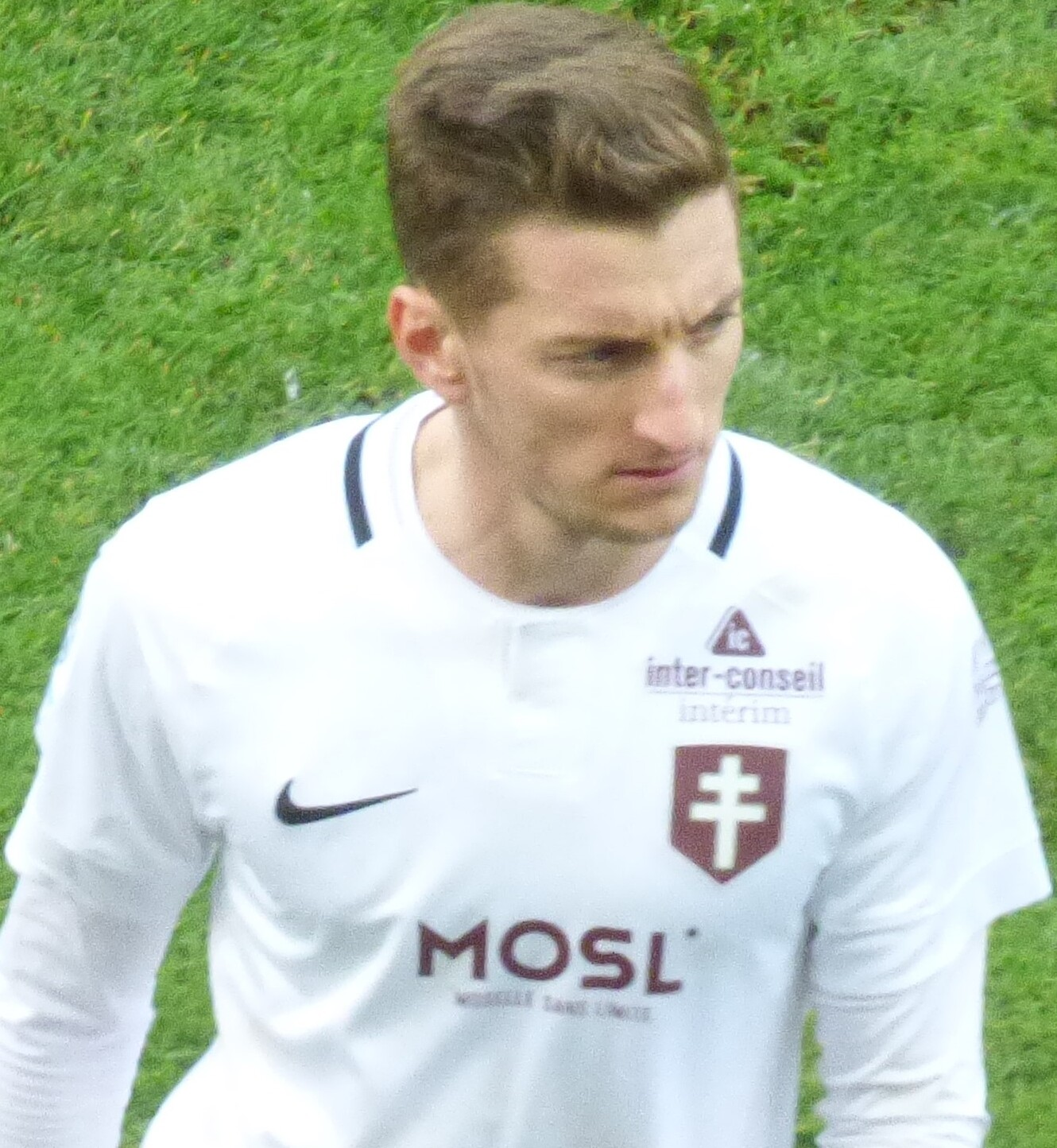
- Balliu with Metz in 2019

Personal information
- Full name: Iván Balliu Campeny
- Date of birth: 1 January 1992 (age 34)
- Place of birth: Caldes de Malavella, Spain
- Height: 1.72 m (5 ft 8 in)
- Position: Right-back

Team information
- Current team: Rayo Vallecano
- Number: 20

Youth career
- 1996–2001: UE Caldes
- 2001–2004: Girona
- 2004–2011: Barcelona

Senior career*
Years	Team	Apps	(Gls)
2011–2013	Barcelona B	53	(0)
2013–2015	Arouca	58	(0)
2015–2019	Metz	104	(1)
2019–2021	Almería	62	(1)
2021–	Rayo Vallecano	151	(1)

International career
2008	Spain U16	3	(1)
2008	Spain U17	3	(0)
2017–2026	Albania	24	(0)
- * Club domestic league appearances and goals as of 16:02, 24 October 2026 (UTC)

Iván Balliu Campeny (born 1 January 1992) is a professional footballer who plays as a right-back for La Liga club Rayo Vallecano.

After starting out at Barcelona B, he went on to compete professionally in Spain, Portugal and France. In La Liga, he appeared for Rayo Vallecano.

Balliu represented his native Spain at youth level before declaring for Albania, for which he qualified via his father. He was first included in an Albanian senior squad in 2017, making his debut in October of that year and being selected for Euro 2024.

== Club career ==
=== Barcelona ===
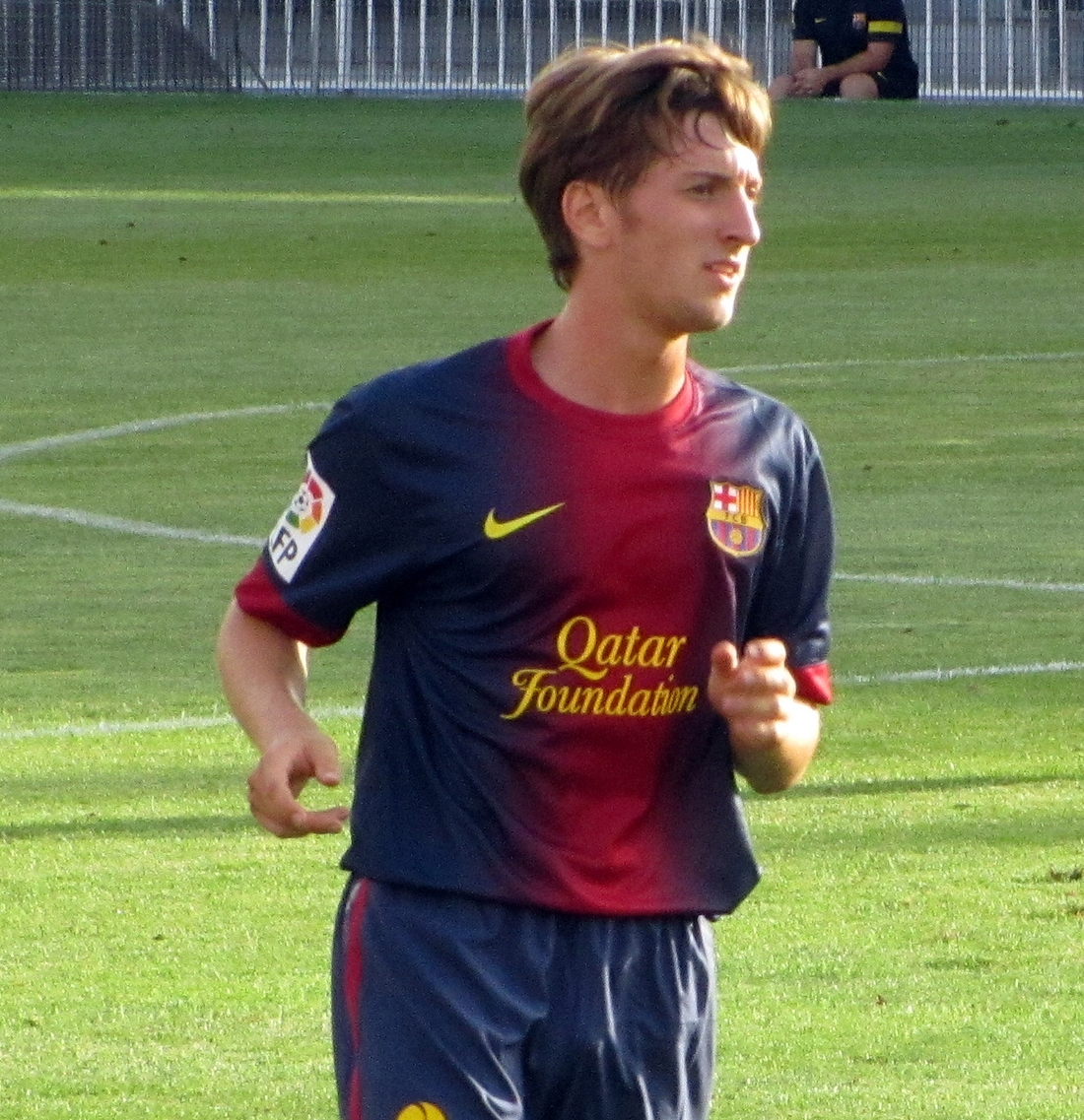
Balliu playing for Barcelona B in 2012

Born in Caldes de Malavella, Girona, Catalonia to an Albanian father and a Spanish mother, Balliu began playing football at the age of 4 with Unió Esportiva Caldes, joining Girona five years later and completing his development at Barcelona's La Masia. He made his senior debut in the 2010–11 season, playing two Segunda División games with the latter's reserves and starting against Girona in a 2–0 away win. In that year, he was also captain of the treble-winning Juvenil A team.

On 30 May 2013, Balliu's contract expired and he was told that he would be released.

=== Arouca ===
On 21 July 2013, Balliu signed with Arouca in Portugal for two seasons. He made his Primeira Liga debut on 1 September, in a 1–0 home victory over Rio Ave (90 minutes played).

=== Metz ===
Balliu joined French club Metz on 17 July 2015, on a two-year deal. He scored his first goal as a professional on 16 October, helping the hosts come from behind in the 2–2 home draw with Clermont.

After contributing 24 appearances in his first season to help his team to return to Ligue 1 after a one-year absence, Balliu's first match in the competition occurred on 13 August 2016, in a 3–2 home win over Lille.

=== Almería ===
On 12 August 2019, Balliu agreed to a two-year contract with Almería of the Spanish second division. He scored his first goal in his country of birth on 7 March 2020, helping the hosts defeat Deportivo de La Coruña 4–0.

=== Rayo Vallecano ===
Balliu moved to newly promoted Rayo Vallecano on 14 July 2021, on a two-year deal. He made his La Liga debut on 15 August at the age of 29, playing the entire 3–0 defeat at Sevilla. His first goal came the following 9 January, when he closed the 1–1 home draw against Real Betis.

Balliu made his debut in European competition in the 2025–26 campaign, aged 33. He started both legs of the 5–0 aggregate win over Belarusian club Neman Grodno in the play-off round of the UEFA Conference League.

== International career ==
Of Albanian descent on his father's side, Balliu was eligible to represent Albania, speaking of his interest in an interview on 24 October 2016. On 22 August 2017, he received Albanian citizenship, thus becoming eligible to play for the national team. He was called up for the first time shortly after when newly appointed coach Christian Panucci picked him for 2018 FIFA World Cup qualifiers against Liechtenstein and Macedonia on 2 and 5 September, and his first match occurred also during that stage when he featured the first half of the 3–0 loss to Spain in Alicante on 6 October.

Balliu soon faced strong competition for a place in the squad, mostly from established right-back Elseid Hysaj. Later on, he had to fight for position with emerging defensive options such as Mario Mitaj.

Following his transfer to Almería, Balliu began being regularly overlooked by new manager Edoardo Reja despite having two solid seasons in the second tier. On 10 June 2022, in a 2022–23 UEFA Nations League B fixture against Israel, he won a penalty after being fouled late in the first half which Armando Broja converted for the opening goal, but the hosts were eventually beaten 2–1 at the Arena Kombëtare.

Balliu was selected by coach Sylvinho for the UEFA Euro 2024 finals. In a group-stage exit, his only appearance of the tournament was a 1–0 defeat against his native Spain in Düsseldorf.

After declining call-ups for the Nations League C in September and October 2026, Balliu retired from international football with 24 caps to his credit.

== Personal life ==
Balliu's father, Salvador, served as mayor of Caldes de Malavella between 2011 and 2025. The former married Marta Soler on 17 June 2017.

== Career statistics ==
=== Club ===
As of match played 24 October 2026

Appearances and goals by club, season and competition
Club	Season	League			National cup		League cup		Continental		Other		Total	
Club	Season	Division	Apps	Goals	Apps	Goals	Apps	Goals	Apps	Goals	Apps	Goals	Apps	Goals
Barcelona B	2010–11	Segunda División	2	0	—		—		—		—		2	0
Barcelona B	2011–12	Segunda División	20 (Note: Although some statistical databases list 21 appearances, the Liga de Fútbol Profesional's official 2011–12 season report records 20 (19 starts and one substitute appearance), which is followed here.)	0	—		—		—		—		20	0
Barcelona B	2012–13	Segunda División	31	0	—		—		—		—		31	0
Barcelona B	Total		53	0	—		—		—		—		53	0
Arouca	2013–14	Primeira Liga	26	0	3	0	2	0	—		—		31	0
Arouca	2014–15	Primeira Liga	32	0	1	0	3	0	—		—		36	0
Arouca	Total		58	0	4	0	5	0	—		—		67	0
Metz	2015–16	Ligue 2	24	1	1	0	2	0	—		—		27	1
Metz	2016–17	Ligue 1	27	0	—		3	0	—		—		30	0
Metz	2017–18	Ligue 1	25	0	3	0	—		—		—		28	0
Metz	2018–19	Ligue 2	28	0	3	1	2	0	—		—		33	1
Metz	Total		104	1	7	1	7	0	—		—		118	2
Almería	2019–20	Segunda División	30	1	0	0	—		—		2 (Note: Appearances in La Liga play-offs)	0	32	1
Almería	2020–21	Segunda División	32	0	1	0	—		—		2	0	35	0
Almería	Total		62	1	1	0	—		—		4	0	67	1
Rayo Vallecano	2021–22	La Liga	35	1	5	0	—		—		—		40	1
Rayo Vallecano	2022–23	La Liga	37	0	0	0	—		—		—		37	0
Rayo Vallecano	2023–24	La Liga	33	0	0	0	—		—		—		33	0
Rayo Vallecano	2024–25	La Liga	25	0	4	0	—		—		—		29	0
Rayo Vallecano	2025–26	La Liga	14	0	3	0	—		10 (Note: Appearances in UEFA Conference League)	0	—		27	0
Rayo Vallecano	2026–27	La Liga	7	0	0	0	—		—		—		7	0
Rayo Vallecano	Total		151	1	12	0	—		10	0	—		173	1
Career total			428	3	24	1	12	0	10	0	4	0	478	4

=== International ===
Appearances and goals by national team and year
National team	Year	Apps	Goals
Albania	2017	1	0
Albania	2019	1	0
Albania	2021	1	0
Albania	2022	5	0
Albania	2023	3	0
Albania	2024	6	0
Albania	2025	6	0
Albania	2026	1	0
Total		24	0

== Honours ==
Metz

- Ligue 2: 2018–19

Rayo Vallecano

- UEFA Conference League runner-up: 2025–26
