= Giorgi Makaridze =

Georgian footballer

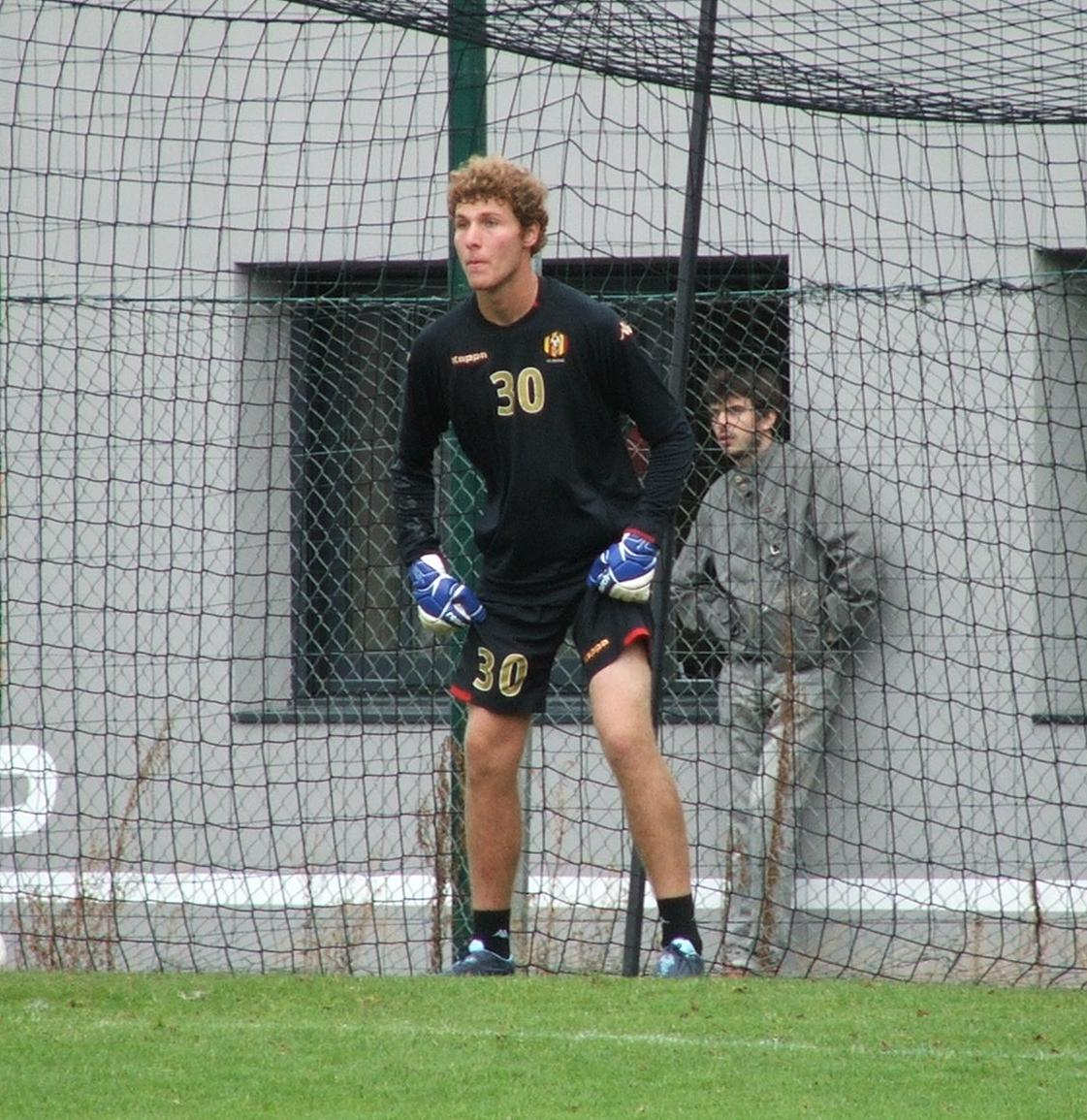
- Makaridze playing for Le Mans in 2009

Personal information
- Date of birth: 31 March 1990 (age 36)
- Place of birth: Tbilisi, USSR
- Height: 1.94 m (6 ft 4 in)
- Position: Goalkeeper

Team information
- Current team: Iberia 1999
- Number: 31

Youth career
- 2003–2006: Dinamo Tbilisi

Senior career*
Years	Team	Apps	(Gls)
2006–2008	Dinamo Tbilisi-2	9	(0)
2009–2013	Le Mans	34	(0)
2014	Doxa Katokopia	0	(0)
2014–2016	Feirense	54	(1)
2016–2018	Moreirense	33	(0)
2018–2019	Rio Ave	0	(0)
2019–2020	Vitória Setúbal	43	(0)
2020–2022	Almería	34	(0)
2022–2023	Ponferradina	7	(0)
2023	Marítimo	6	(0)
2024	Covilhã	12	(0)
2024–	Iberia 1999	56	(0)

International career
2006	Georgia U17		
2007–2011	Georgia U21		
2007–2020	Georgia	17	(0)
- * Club domestic league appearances and goals as of 17 August 2026

Giorgi Makaridze (Georgian: გიორგი მაკარიძე, romanized: giorgi mak'aridze, pronounced [ɡioɾɡi makʼaɾidze]; born 31 March 1990) is a Georgian professional footballer who plays as a goalkeeper for Erovnuli Liga club Iberia 1999.

He previously played for Dinamo Tbilisi, Le Mans, Doxa Katokopia, Feirense, Moreirense, F.C Rio Ave and Almería.

Makaridze is the two-time winner of the Erovnuli Liga with Iberia 1999. He was named Goalkeeper of the Year and included in Team of the Season.

== Club career ==
Born in Tbilisi, Makaridze began his career in the Dinamo Tbilisi academy, afterwards moving to Le Mans UC72 on 10 January 2009 for €800,000 on a four-year contract worth €85,000.

In April 2014, he left Le Mans for Doxa Katokopia, but would never play a single game for the Cypriot club, leaving them for Feirense in Portugal, who were in Segunda Division Portugal at the time, playing 54 games. After getting promoted to the Primeira Liga, Makaridze joined Moreirense, playing 33 games and winning the 2017 Taça da Liga with them. In 2018, there was a rumor that Makaridze would join Benfica, but this move would never materialise, and instead he signed with Rio Ave. He would later agree to mutually terminate his contract with them, joining Vitoria FC in January of the same season.

On 12 September 2020, Makaridze moved away from the Portuguese league to sign a two-year contract with Segunda División side UD Almería. He was released by the club on 3 June 2022 as his contract was due to expire, and joined SD Ponferradina on 4 July.

On 9 January 2023, after being mainly a backup to Amir Abedzadeh, Makaridze left Ponfe.

On 11 January 2023, Makaridze signed a year-and-a-half contract with Marítimo in Portugal. On 27 July 2023, Marítimo announced that Makaridze's contract had been terminated by mutual agreement.

On 8 February 2024, Makaridze joined Portuguese Liga 3 side Sporting da Covilhã.

In July 2024, Makaridze returned to Georgia to sign for the reigning cup holders Iberia 1999. In the next two seasons, he twice became the league champion. Individually, he was selected as Erovnuli Liga Goalkeeper of the Year and named in Team of the Year.

== International career ==
Makaridze was a member of Georgia U17 team and played 10 games there. He also participated in Georgia U19 (eight appearances) and Georgia U21 (nine appearances). At the age of 17, Makaridze established himself as a great prospect and starter for the Georgia national team along with other teenagers, such as Levan Kenia and Levan Mchedlidze.

== Career statistics ==
As of 14 January 2018

Appearances and goals by club, season and competition
Club	Season	League			National cup (Note: Includes Coupe de France, Taça de Portugal)		Continental		Other		Total	
Club	Season	Division	Apps	Goals	Apps	Goals	Apps	Goals	Apps	Goals	Apps	Goals
Le Mans	2009–10	Ligue 1	2	0	0	0	—		1 (Note: Appearance(s) in Coupe de la Ligue)	0	3	0
Le Mans	2010–11	Ligue 2	0	0	5	0	—		0	0	5	0
Le Mans	2011–12	Ligue 2	27	0	2	0	—		3	0	32	0
Le Mans	2012–13	Ligue 2	5	0	2	0	—		0	0	7	0
Le Mans	Total		34	0	9	0	—		4	0	47	0
Doxa Katokopias	2013–14	Cypriot First Division	0	0	0	0	—		—		0	0
Feirense	2014–15	Segunda Liga	18	0	1	0	—		—		19	0
Feirense	2015–16	LigaPro	36	1	3	0	—		2 (Note: Appearances in Taça da Liga)	0	41	1
Feirense	Total		54	1	4	0	—		2	0	60	1
Moreirense	2016–17	Primeira Liga	33	0	1	0	—		3	0	37	0
Moreirense	2017–18	LigaPro	0	0	0	0	—		0	0	0	0
Moreirense	Total		33	0	1	0	—		3	0	37	0
Career total			121	1	14	0	0	0	9	0	144	1

== Honours ==
Moreirense

- Taça da Liga: 2016–17

Almería

- Segunda División: 2021–22

Individual

- Segunda Liga Best Goalkeeper: 2015–16
