= Dani Albiar =

Spanish footballer

Personal information
- Full name: Daniel Albiar Serrano
- Date of birth: 8 January 2000 (age 26)
- Place of birth: Cartagena, Spain
- Height: 1.73 m (5 ft 8 in)
- Position: Attacking midfielder

Team information
- Current team: Lorca Deportiva

Youth career
- Santa Ana
- 2013–2018: Almería

Senior career*
Years	Team	Apps	(Gls)
2017–2021	Almería B	71	(7)
2019–2023	Almería	1	(0)
2021–2022	→ Alcoyano (loan)	0	(0)
2022–2023	→ Cartagena B (loan)	50	(5)
2023–2024	Cartagena B	27	(1)
2024–	Lorca Deportiva	6	(1)
- * Club domestic league appearances and goals as of 13 October 2024

Daniel "Dani" Albiar Serrano (born 8 January 2000) is a Spanish footballer who plays as an attacking midfielder for Lorca Deportiva.

== Club career ==
Born in Cartagena, Region of Murcia, Albiar joined UD Almería's youth setup in 2013, at the age of 13. He made his senior debut with the reserves on 22 October 2017, coming on as a second-half substitute for Sergio Pérez and scoring the equalizer in a 1–1 Tercera División home draw against CD Huétor Vega.

Albiar made his first team debut for the Rojiblancos on 19 December 2019, replacing José Romera in the extra time in a 2–3 away loss against UD Tamaraceite, for the season's Copa del Rey. His Segunda División debut occurred the following 26 January, after coming on for fellow youth graduate Iván Martos in a 0–2 home loss against Elche CF.

On 31 August 2021, Albiar moved to Primera División RFEF side CD Alcoyano on a one-year loan deal. The following 4 January, after making no appearances for the side, he moved to FC Cartagena's reserves in Tercera División RFEF, also in a temporary deal.

Albiar scored an extra-time winner in Cartagena B's promotion match against CD Quintanar del Rey on 22 May 2022, and had his loan was extended for the 2022–23 season on 11 July. On 31 August 2023, he terminated his contract with the Andalusians and signed a permanent link with the Efesé.
