= 2015–16 Real Betis season =

Real Betis
2015–16 season
- President: Juan Carlos Ollero
- Head coach: Gus Poyet
- Stadium: Benito Villamarín
- La Liga: 10th
- Copa del Rey: Round of 16
- Top goalscorer: League: Rubén Castro (19); All: Rubén Castro (19)
Home colours	Away colours	Third colours

The 2015–16 Real Betis season was the club's 107th season in its history. It spent the season participating in La Liga, the top-flight of Spanish football, after playing one season in the Segunda División in 2014–15.

== Players ==
=== Current squad ===
As of 29 January 2016

Note: Flags indicate national team as defined under FIFA eligibility rules; some limited exceptions apply. Players may hold more than one non-FIFA nationality.

No.	Pos.	Nation	Player
1	GK	ESP	Dani Giménez
2	DF	ESP	Francisco Molinero
3	DF	EGY	Amro Tarek
4	DF	ESP	Bruno
5	MF	ALG	Foued Kadir
7	MF	ESP	Joaquín
9	FW	NED	Ricky van Wolfswinkel (on loan from Norwich City)
10	MF	ESP	Dani Ceballos
11	MF	PER	Juan Manuel Vargas
12	DF	ITA	Cristiano Piccini
13	GK	ESP	Antonio Adán
14	MF	ESP	Xavi Torres (vice-captain)
15	MF	FRA	Didier Digard
16	MF	ESP	Álvaro Cejudo

No.	Pos.	Nation	Player
17	DF	GER	Heiko Westermann
18	MF	SEN	Alfred N'Diaye
19	FW	ESP	Jorge Molina (captain)
20	DF	ARG	Germán Pezzella
21	MF	ESP	Álvaro Vadillo
22	MF	ESP	Francisco Portillo
23	MF	NED	Rafael van der Vaart
24	FW	ESP	Rubén Castro
25	MF	BRA	Petros
33	DF	ESP	Francisco Varela
41	GK	ESP	Pedro López
52	MF	ESP	Fabián
—	FW	BRA	Leandro Damião
—	MF	BEL	Charly Musonda (on loan from Chelsea)

=== Out on loan ===
Note: Flags indicate national team as defined under FIFA eligibility rules; some limited exceptions apply. Players may hold more than one non-FIFA nationality.

No.	Pos.	Nation	Player
—	DF	ESP	Álex Martínez (at Elche)
—	DF	ESP	José Caro (at Elche)
—	MF	ESP	Dani Pacheco (at Alavés)

No.	Pos.	Nation	Player
—	MF	CHI	Lorenzo Reyes (at Almería)
—	FW	ESP	Álex Alegría (at Numancia)
—	FW	URU	Braian Rodríguez (at Grêmio)

== Competitions ==
=== Overall ===
Competition	Started round	Final position / round	First match	Last match
La Liga	–			
Copa del Rey	Round of 32			

Updated to match played 6 August 2015
Source: Competitions

=== Overview ===
Competition	Record							
Competition	Pld	W	D	L	GF	GA	GD	Win %
La Liga	35	10	11	14	31	48	−17	28.57
Copa del Rey	4	1	1	2	5	9	−4	25.00
Total	39	11	12	16	36	57	−21	28.21

Last updated: 25 April 2016
Source: Competitions

=== La Liga ===
==== League table ====
Pos	Team	Pld	W	D	L	GF	GA	GD	Pts
8	Málaga	38	12	12	14	38	35	+3	48 (Note: Málaga finished ahead of Real Sociedad on head-to-head record; Málaga 3–1 Real Sociedad, Real Sociedad 1–1 Málaga.)
9	Real Sociedad	38	13	9	16	45	48	−3	48
10	Real Betis	38	11	12	15	34	52	−18	45
11	Las Palmas	38	12	8	18	45	53	−8	44 (Note: Las Palmas finished ahead of Valencia on head-to-head record; Valencia 1–1 Las Palmas, Las Palmas 2–1 Valencia.)
12	Valencia	38	11	11	16	46	48	−2	44

Source: La Liga, Soccerway
Rules for classification: 1) Points; 2) Head-to-head points; 3) Head-to-head goal difference; 4) Goal difference; 5) Goals scored; 6) Fair-play points; 7) Play-off.

==== Results summary ====
Overall								Home						Away					
Pld	W	D	L	GF	GA	GD	Pts	W	D	L	GF	GA	GD	W	D	L	GF	GA	GD
38	11	12	15	33	51	−18	45	6	6	7	17	23	−6	5	6	8	16	28	−12

Last updated: 15 May 2016.

==== Result round by round ====
Round	1	2	3	4	5	6	7	8	9	10	11	12	13	14	15	16	17	18	19	20	21	22	23	24	25	26	27	28	29	30	31	32	33	34	35	36	37	38
Ground	H	A	H	A	H	A	A	H	A	H	A	H	A	H	A	H	A	H	A	A	H	A	H	A	H	H	A	H	A	A	A	H	A	H	A	H	A	H
Result	D	L	W	D	L	W	W	L	D	L	W	L	W	D	L	D	L	L	L	D	D	L	W	D	D	D	W	W	L	L	L	W	D	W	L	L	D	W
Position	7	18	9	11	14	10	8	10	10	13	11	12	11	11	11	12	12	14	15	15	14	15	12	14	13	13	13	10	11	13	14	13	14	13	13	13	14	10

A = Away; H = Home; W = Win; D = Draw; L = Loss

==== Matches ====
Win Draw Loss

23 August 2015 1	Real Betis	1–1	Villarreal	Seville
22:30 CEST	Bruno (yellow card) 26'; Cejudo (yellow card) 35'; Pezzella (yellow card) 50'; Castro 87'	Report	Soldado 31'; Castillejo (yellow card) 49'; Bruno (red card) 90+2'	Stadium: Benito Villamarín; Attendance: 37,996; Referee: Iñaki Vicandi Garrido

29 August 2015 2	Real Madrid	5–0	Real Betis	Madrid
22:30 CEST	Bale 2', 89'; Kroos (yellow card) 24'; Rodríguez 39', 50'; Benzema 47'; Varane (yellow card) 60'; Casemiro (yellow card) 86'	Report	Vargas (yellow card) 29'; Molinero (yellow card) 38'; Torres (yellow card) 90+2'	Stadium: Santiago Bernabéu; Attendance: 70,876; Referee: Alejandro Hernández Hernández

12 September 2015 3	Real Betis	1–0	Real Sociedad	Seville
22:00 CEST	N'Diaye (yellow card) 27'; Bruno (yellow card) 37'; Castro 41'; Petros (yellow card) 42' (yellow-red card) 45+1'; Ceballos (yellow card) 78'; Portillo (yellow card) 90+2'	Report	De la Bella (yellow card) 20'; Pardo (yellow card) 36'; Reyes (yellow card) 56'	Stadium: Benito Villamarín; Attendance: 37,909; Referee: Alfonso Álvarez Izquierdo

19 September 2015 4	Valencia	0–0	Real Betis	Valencia
18:15 CEST	Orbán (yellow card) 46'; Mustafi (yellow card) 49'; De Paul (yellow card) 78'; Fuego (yellow card) 86'	Report	Ceballos (yellow card) 21' (yellow-red card) 48'; Vargas (yellow card) 30'; Adán (yellow card) 90+3'	Stadium: Mestalla; Attendance: 40,560; Referee: Carlos Velasco Carballo

24 September 2015 5	Real Betis	1–2	Deportivo La Coruña	Seville
22:00 CEST	Joaquín (yellow card) 27'; Piccini (yellow card) 43'; Petros 59'; Westermann (yellow card) 86'	Report	J. Rodríguez (yellow card) 45'; Cartabia 54'; Fajr 72'; Navarro (yellow card) 76'; Lux (yellow card) 79'; Laure (yellow card) 82'; Luisinho (yellow card) 90+4'	Stadium: Benito Villamarín; Attendance: 36,093; Referee: Jesús Gil Manzano

27 September 2015 6	Sporting Gijón	1–2	Real Betis	Gijón
12:00 CEST	Castro (yellow card) 17'; Cases (yellow card) 90'	Report	Joaquín 46'; Castro 57'; N'Diaye (yellow card) 69'	Stadium: El Molinón; Attendance: 23,320; Referee: Juan Martínez Munuera

4 October 2015 7	Rayo Vallecano	0–2	Real Betis	Madrid
12:00 CEST	Bangoura (yellow card) 52'; Guerra (yellow card) 68'; Bebé (yellow card) 89'; Raț (yellow card) 90+3'	Report	Westermann 20'; Rennella (yellow card) 37'; Piccini (yellow card) 40'; Castro 61'	Stadium: Campo de Vallecas; Attendance: 11,719; Referee: Ignacio Iglesias Villanueva

17 October 2015 8	Real Betis	1–3	Espanyol	Seville
22:05 CEST	Ceballos (yellow card) 54'; Portillo (yellow card) 58'; Rennella 89'	Report	Roco 4'; Pérez (yellow card) 20'; Arbilla (yellow card) 30'; Caicedo 51', (yellow card) 61'; Sánchez 55', (yellow card) 70'	Stadium: Benito Villamarín; Attendance: 30,187; Referee: Ricardo de Burgos Bengoetxea

24 October 2015 9	Granada	1–1	Real Betis	Granada
18:15 CEST	Foulquier 3'; Márquez (yellow card) 33'; Pérez (yellow card) 39'; Biraghi (yellow card) 78'	Report	Castro 40' (pen.); Varela (yellow card) 69'; Portillo (yellow card) 78'; Digard (yellow card) 84'	Stadium: Nuevo Los Cármenes; Attendance: 18,358; Referee: Antonio Mateu Lahoz

1 November 2015 10	Real Betis	1–3	Athletic Bilbao	Seville
20:30 CET	Ceballos (yellow card) 31'; Castro 67' (pen.); Pezzella (yellow card) 75'	Report	Williams 8', 45'; García (yellow card) 12', (goal) 87'; San José (yellow card) 23'; Laporte (yellow card) 33'; Etxeita (yellow card) 65'	Stadium: Benito Villamarín; Attendance: 24,879; Referee: José González González

7 November 2015 11	Málaga	0–1	Real Betis	Málaga
22:05 CET	Angeleri (yellow card) 48'; Charles (yellow card) 79'	Report	Bruno (yellow card) 31'; Cejudo (yellow card) 40'; Castro 64'; Piccini (yellow card) 78'; Varela (yellow card) 90'; Van Wolfswinkel (yellow card) 90+2'	Stadium: La Rosaleda; Attendance: 23,803; Referee: Eduardo Prieto Iglesias

22 November 2015 12	Real Betis	0–1	Atlético Madrid	Seville
20:30 CET	Bruno (yellow card) 53'	Report	Koke 7'; Filipe Luís (yellow card) 9'; Tiago (yellow card) 27'; Gámez (yellow card) 38'; Gabi (yellow card) 77'	Stadium: Benito Villamarín; Attendance: 41,976; Referee: Santiago Jaime Latre

27 November 2015 13	Levante	0–1	Real Betis	Valencia
20:30 CET	Deyverson (yellow card) 14'; Verza (yellow card) 44'; Feddal (yellow card) 66'; Roger (yellow card) 71'; P. López (yellow card) 78'; Juanfran (red card) 81'; Víctor (yellow card) 90+5'	Report	Castro 4'; Cejudo (yellow card) 37'; Westermann (yellow card) 48' (red card) 79'; Varela (yellow card) 80'; Adán (yellow card) 90+3'	Stadium: Ciutat de València; Attendance: 13,957; Referee: José María Sánchez Martínez

5 December 2015 14	Real Betis	1–1	Celta Vigo	Seville
22:05 CET	Bruno (yellow card) 16'; N'Diaye (yellow card) 34'; Petros (yellow card) 38'; Molina (yellow card) 68', (goal) 82'; Ceballos (yellow card) 87'	Report	Bongonda (yellow card) 22', (goal) 25'; Planas (yellow card) 29'; Mallo (yellow card) 35'; Jonny (red card) 48'	Stadium: Benito Villamarín; Attendance: 33,762; Referee: Alejandro Hernández Hernández

12 December 2015 15	Las Palmas	1–0	Real Betis	Las Palmas
22:05 CET	Mesa (yellow card) 52'; Viera (yellow card) 62'; Castellano (yellow card) 64'; Willian José 90+3'	Report		Stadium: Gran Canaria; Attendance: 16,701; Referee: Jesús Gil Manzano

19 December 2015 16	Real Betis	0–0	Sevilla	Seville
20:30 CET	Molinero (yellow card) 4'; Westermann (yellow card) 18'; Ceballos (yellow card) 50'; Cejudo (yellow card) 62'; Joaquín (yellow card) 69'; Adán (yellow card) 79'; Digard (yellow card) 90+2'	Report	Krychowiak (yellow card) 28'; Vitolo (yellow card) 56'; Trémoulinas (yellow card) 63'; Rami (yellow card) 79'; Iborra (yellow card) 89'	Stadium: Benito Villamarín; Attendance: 50,073; Referee: Carlos Clos Gómez

30 December 2015 17	Barcelona	4–0	Real Betis	Barcelona
20:30 CET	Westermann 29' (o.g.); Messi 33'; Suárez 46', 83'; Alves (yellow card) 77'	Report	Adán (yellow card) 27'; Petros (yellow card) 30'; Pezzella (yellow card) 68'	Stadium: Camp Nou; Attendance: 83,630; Referee: Iñaki Vicandi Garrido

3 January 2016 18	Real Betis	0–4	Eibar	Seville
16:00 CET	Figueras (yellow card) 16'; Vargas (yellow card) 34'; Molina (yellow card) 58'; Castro (yellow card) 90+2'	Report	Capa 3'; Inui (yellow card) 13'; Keko 17'; Adrián (yellow card) 61', (goal) 71'; Luna (yellow card) 66'; Borja 82'	Stadium: Benito Villamarín; Attendance: 33,609; Referee: Eduardo Prieto Iglesias

9 January 2016 19	Getafe	1–0	Real Betis	Getafe
18:15 CET	Vázquez 57'; Guaita (yellow card) 89'	Report	Piccini (yellow card) 54'; Vargas (yellow card) 62'; Pezzella (yellow card) 90+3'	Stadium: Coliseum Alfonso Pérez; Attendance: 6,940; Referee: Alfonso Álvarez Izquierdo

16 January 2016 20	Villarreal	0–0	Real Betis	Vilarreal
20:30 CET	Ruiz (yellow card) 24'; Castillejo (yellow card) 90+4'	Report	Petros (yellow card) 79'	Stadium: El Madrigal; Attendance: 15,402; Referee: José González González

24 January 2016 21	Real Betis	1–1	Real Madrid	Seville
20:30 CET	Cejudo 7'; Vargas (yellow card) 58'; Petros (yellow card) 61'; Molinero (yellow card) 69'	Report	Danilo (yellow card) 64'; Benzema 71'; Carvajal (yellow card) 90+2'	Stadium: Benito Villamarín; Attendance: 48,111; Referee: Juan Martínez Munuera

30 January 2016 22	Real Sociedad	2–1	Real Betis	San Sebastián
22:05 CET	Prieto 18'; I. Martínez 33'; Pardo (yellow card) 58'	Report	Molinero (yellow card) 36'; Castro 51'; Cejudo (yellow card) 60'; Portillo (yellow card) 90'; Joaquín (yellow card) 90+1'	Stadium: Anoeta; Referee: Eduardo Prieto Iglesias

7 February 2016 23	Real Betis	1–0	Valencia	Seville
16:00 CET	Pezzella (yellow card) 11'; Castro 49'; Ceballos (yellow card) 70'; Adán (yellow card) 74'; Montoya (yellow card) 78'	Report	Mustafi (yellow card) 22'; Gomes (yellow card) 27'; Cheryshev (yellow card) 29'; Parejo (yellow card) 35'; Zahibo (yellow card) 58'; Gayà (yellow card) 62' (yellow-red card) 85'	Stadium: Benito Villamarín; Attendance: 40,228; Referee: José María Sánchez Martínez

13 February 2016 24	Deportivo La Coruña	2–2	Real Betis	A Coruña
22:05 CET	Bergantiños 15', (yellow card) 52'; Fajr 51'	Report	Musonda 20'; Vargas 37'	Stadium: Estadio Riazor; Attendance: 17,184; Referee: Alberto Undiano Mallenco

20 February 2016 25	Real Betis	1–1	Sporting Gijón	Seville
20:30 CET	Montoya (yellow card) 32'; Pezzella 67'; N'Diaye (yellow card) 87'	Report	Álvarez (yellow card) 37'; López (yellow card) 60'; Castro 65'; Vranješ (yellow card) 81'	Stadium: Benito Villamarín; Attendance: 41,345; Referee: Alfonso Álvarez Izquierdo

27 February 2016 26	Real Betis	2–2	Rayo Vallecano	Gijón
18:15 CET	Castro 14', 28'; Ceballos (yellow card) 62'; Petros (yellow card) 90+5'	Report	Manucho 48', 51'; Trashorras (yellow card) 62'; Llorente (yellow card) 71'; Quini (yellow card) 76'	Stadium: El Molinón; Attendance: 35,666; Referee: Antonio Mateu Lahoz

2 March 2016 27	Espanyol	0–3	Real Betis	Barcelona
20:30 CET	Caicedo (yellow card) 41'; Pérez (yellow card) 70'; Ó. Duarte (yellow card) 81'; Sánchez (yellow card) 82'	Report	Castro 10'; Bruno (yellow card) 18'; Pezzella 20'; Molinero (yellow card) 69'; Vargas 71'	Stadium: Cornellà-El Prat; Attendance: 23,714; Referee: José María Sánchez Martínez

6 March 2016 28	Real Betis	2–0	Granada	Seville
20:30 CET	Pezzella (yellow card) 12'; Vargas (yellow card) 41' (yellow-red card) 53'; Bruno (yellow card) 71'; Molina (yellow card) 79'; N'Diaye 85'; Castro 90+5'	Report	Peñaranda (yellow card) 20'; Pérez (yellow card) 40'; Success (yellow card) 47'; Lopes (yellow card) 47'; Barral (yellow card) 69'; Costa (yellow card) 76'; Rochina (yellow card) 87'; Fernández (red card)	Stadium: Benito Villamarín; Attendance: 43,174; Referee: Ignacio Iglesias Villanueva

13 March 2016 29	Athletic Bilbao	3–1	Real Betis	Bilbao
18:15 CET	García (yellow card) 20'; Merino 34', 50'; Rico 44'	Report	Castro 85'	Stadium: San Mamés; Attendance: 42,563; Referee: Santiago Jaime Latre

19 March 2016 30	Real Betis	0–1	Málaga	Seville
22:05 CET	Pezzella (yellow card) 17'; Montoya (yellow card) 52'; Molina (yellow card) 90'	Report	Albentosa (yellow card) 27'; Castro (yellow card) 45'; Camacho 82'	Stadium: Benito Villamarín; Attendance: 31,371; Referee: Carlos Clos Gómez

2 April 2016 31	Atlético Madrid	5–1	Real Betis	Madrid
16:00 CEST	Torres 37'; Griezmann 41', 81'; Koke (yellow card) 38'; Juanfran 65'; Thomas 90+1'	Report	Pezzella (yellow card) 61'; Kadir (yellow card) 62'; Torres (yellow card) 74'; Castro 79'	Stadium: Vicente Calderón; Attendance: 46,506; Referee: Alejandro Hernández Hernández

9 April 2016 32	Real Betis	1–0	Levante	Seville
22:05 CEST	N'Diaye (yellow card) 35'; Musonda (yellow card) 70'; Bruno (yellow card) 80'; Castro 81'; Cejudo (yellow card) 90+2'	Report	P. López (yellow card) 82'; Juanfran (yellow card) 89'; José Mari (yellow card) 90+4'	Stadium: Benito Villamarín; Attendance: 37,091; Referee: Eduardo Prieto Iglesias

17 April 2016 33	Celta Vigo	1–1	Real Betis	Vigo
22:05 CEST	Cabral (yellow card) 59'; Jonny (yellow card) 72'; Hernández (yellow card) 78', (goal) 78'; Orellana (yellow card) 89'	Report	N'Diaye 24'; Castro (yellow card) 32'; Ceballos (yellow card) 56'; Cejudo (yellow card) 82'	Stadium: Balaídos; Referee: Ricardo de Burgos Bengoetxea

19 April 2016 34	Real Betis	1–0	Las Palmas	Seville
21:00 CEST	Cejudo (yellow card) 80'; Van Wolfswinkel 83', (yellow card) 86'	Report	Aythami (yellow card) 32' (yellow-red card) 41'; Willian José (yellow card) 68'	Stadium: Benito Villamarín; Attendance: 30,634; Referee: Iñaki Vicandi Garrido

24 April 2016 35	Sevilla	2–0	Betis	Seville
16:00 CEST	Banega (yellow card) 9'; Gameiro (yellow card) 49', (goal) 67'; Reyes (yellow card) 66'; Coke 80'; Escudero (yellow card) 82'; Mariano (yellow card) 90'	Report	Musonda (yellow card) 13'; Pezzella (yellow card) 33'; Cejudo (yellow card) 57'; Westermann (yellow card) 79'	Stadium: Ramón Sánchez Pizjuán; Attendance: 39,523; Referee: Carlos Velasco Carballo

30 April 2016 36	Real Betis	0–2	Barcelona	Seville
20:30 CEST	Bruno (yellow card) 21'; Westermann (yellow card) 28' (yellow-red card) 35'; Petros (yellow card) 34'; Ceballos (yellow card) 67'	Report	Messi (yellow card) 23'; Piqué (yellow card) 23'; Alves (yellow card) 45+1'; Rakitić 50'; Suárez 81'	Stadium: Benito Villamarín; Attendance: 40,467; Referee: Antonio Mateu Lahoz

8 May 2016 37	Eibar	1–1	Real Betis	Eibar
17:00 CEST	Mauro (yellow card) 39'; Enrich 73'	Report	Castro 37'; Cejudo (yellow card) 70'; Montoya (yellow card) 82'; Adán (yellow card) 85'	Stadium: Ipurua; Attendance: 5,168; Referee: Juan Martínez Munuera

15 May 2016 38	Real Betis	2–1	Getafe	Seville
19:30 CEST	Petros (yellow card) 35'; Pezzella 56'; Castro 73' (pen.)	Report	Vergini (yellow card) 52'; J. Rodríguez (yellow card) 52'; Cala (yellow card) 55'; Pereira (yellow card) 66'; Medrán (yellow card) 71', (goal) 84'; Suárez (yellow card) 72'; Emi (red card) 75'; Šćepović (yellow card) 83'; Yoda (yellow card) 89'	Stadium: Benito Villamarín; Attendance: 37,166; Referee: Jesús Gil Manzano

=== Copa del Rey ===
==== Round of 32 ====
2 December 2015 First leg	Real Betis	2–0	Sporting Gijón	Seville
20:00 CET	Vadillo 47'; Petros (yellow card) 64'; Vargas 90+3'	Report	Mascarell (yellow card) 59'; Sanabria (yellow card) 86'	Stadium: Benito Villamarín; Attendance: 21,036; Referee: Iñaki Vicandi Garrido

15 December 2015 Second leg	Sporting Gijón	3–3 (3–5 agg.)	Real Betis	Gijón
20:00 CET	Bernardo 14'; Pérez (yellow card) 26'; Halilović 47', 72' (pen.)	Report	Van Wolfswinkel 18', 83'; Torres (yellow card) 20'; Pezzella (yellow card) 46'; Molinero (yellow card) 54'; Cejudo 88'	Stadium: El Molinón; Attendance: 12,642; Referee: José González González

==== Round of 16 ====
6 January 2016 First leg	Real Betis	0–2	Sevilla	Seville
18:15 CET		Report	Krohn-Dehli 13'; Krychowiak 49'	Stadium: Benito Villamarín; Attendance: 36,832; Referee: Carlos del Cerro Grande

12 January 2016 Second leg	Sevilla	4–0 (6–0 agg.)	Real Betis	Seville
20:30 CET	Reyes 4'; Rami 35'; Gameiro 73'; Kakuta 89'	Report		Stadium: Ramón Sánchez Pizjuán; Attendance: 36,812; Referee: Antonio Mateu Lahoz

== See also ==
2015–16 La Liga
