= 2016–17 Real Betis season =

Real Betis
2016–17 season
- President: Ángel Haro
- Head coach: Víctor Sánchez
- Stadium: Benito Villamarín
- La Liga: 15th
- Copa del Rey: Round of 32
- Top goalscorer: League: Rubén Castro (13); All: Rubén Castro (13)
| Home colours | Away colours | Third colours |

The 2016–17 season was Real Betis's second consecutive season in La Liga after spending 2014–15 in the Segunda División.

== Squad ==
As of 31 August 2016

Note: Flags indicate national team as defined under FIFA eligibility rules; some limited exceptions apply. Players may hold more than one non-FIFA nationality.

| No. | Pos. | Nation | Player |
|---|---|---|---|
| 1 | GK | ESP | Dani Giménez |
| 2 | DF | ESP | Rafa Navarro |
| 3 | DF | ESP | Álex Martínez |
| 4 | DF | ESP | Bruno |
| 5 | MF | BRA | Petros |
| 6 | MF | CHI | Felipe Gutiérrez |
| 8 | MF | FRA | Jonas Martin |
| 9 | FW | PAR | Antonio Sanabria |
| 10 | MF | ESP | Dani Ceballos |
| 11 | MF | ESP | Matías Nahuel (on loan from Villarreal) |
| 12 | DF | ITA | Cristiano Piccini |
| 13 | GK | ESP | Antonio Adán |
| 14 | DF | DEN | Riza Durmisi |

| No. | Pos. | Nation | Player |
|---|---|---|---|
| 15 | DF | NED | Ryan Donk (on loan from Galatasaray) |
| 16 | MF | ESP | Álvaro Cejudo |
| 17 | MF | ESP | Joaquín |
| 18 | FW | UKR | Roman Zozulya |
| 19 | FW | ESP | Álex Alegría |
| 20 | DF | ARG | Germán Pezzella |
| 21 | MF | ESP | Fabián |
| 22 | MF | SRB | Darko Brašanac |
| 23 | DF | ALG | Aïssa Mandi |
| 24 | FW | ESP | Rubén Castro |
| 25 | GK | ESP | Manu Herrera |
| 28 | DF | ESP | José Carlos |

== Competitions ==
=== Overall ===
As of 21 May 2017

| Competition | Final position |
|---|---|
| La Liga | 15th |
| Copa del Rey | Round of 32 |

=== La Liga ===
==== League table ====
| Pos | Team | Pld | W | D | L | GF | GA | GD | Pts |
|---|---|---|---|---|---|---|---|---|---|
| 13 | Celta Vigo | 38 | 13 | 6 | 19 | 53 | 69 | −16 | 45 |
| 14 | Las Palmas | 38 | 10 | 9 | 19 | 53 | 74 | −21 | 39 (Note: Las Palmas ahead of Real Betis on head-to-head goal difference: Las Palmas–Real Betis 4–1, Real Betis–Las Palmas 2–0) |
| 15 | Real Betis | 38 | 10 | 9 | 19 | 41 | 64 | −23 | 39 |
| 16 | Deportivo La Coruña | 38 | 8 | 12 | 18 | 43 | 61 | −18 | 36 |
| 17 | Leganés | 38 | 8 | 11 | 19 | 36 | 55 | −19 | 35 |

Source: La Liga, Soccerway
Rules for classification: 1) Points; 2) Head-to-head points; 3) Head-to-head goal difference; 4) Goal difference; 5) Goals scored; 6) Fair-play points; 7) Play-off.

==== Results summary ====
| Overall | | | | | | | | Home | | | | | | Away | | | | | |
| Pld | W | D | L | GF | GA | GD | Pts | W | D | L | GF | GA | GD | W | D | L | GF | GA | GD |
|---|---|---|---|---|---|---|---|---|---|---|---|---|---|---|---|---|---|---|---|
| 38 | 10 | 9 | 19 | 41 | 66 | −25 | 39 | 6 | 7 | 6 | 22 | 24 | −2 | 4 | 2 | 13 | 19 | 42 | −23 |

Last updated: 20 May 2017.
Source: Competitive matches

==== Matches ====
Win Draw Loss

| 20 August 2016 1 | Barcelona | 6–2 | Real Betis | Barcelona |
| 18:15 CEST | Turan 6'; Messi 37', 57'; L. Suárez 42', 56', 82', (yellow card) 62' | Report | Castro 21', 84', (yellow card) 77'; Cejudo (yellow card) 45'; Ceballos (yellow card) 68' | Stadium: Camp Nou; Attendance: 65,731; Referee: Alberto Undiano Mallenco (Navarre) |

| 26 August 2016 2 | Real Betis | 0–0 | Deportivo La Coruña | Seville |
| 10:45 CEST (UTC+02:00) | | Report | Juanfran (yellow card) 65'; Mosquera (yellow card) 90+3' | Stadium: Benito Villamarín; Attendance: 34,543; Referee: Carlos Clos Gómez |

| 11 September 2016 3 | Valencia | 2–3 | Real Betis | Valencia |
| 16:00 CEST (UTC+02:00) | Pérez (yellow card) 22' (red card) 50'; Nani (yellow card) 60'; Rodrigo 75'; Garay 78' | Report | Castro 38', 90+2'; Joaquín 54'; Brašanac (yellow card) 56'; Piccini (yellow card) 63'; Petros (yellow card) 71'; Musonda (yellow card) 72' | Stadium: Mestalla; Attendance: 36,789; Referee: José González González |

| 16 September 2016 4 | Real Betis | 2–2 | Granada | Seville |
| 20:45 CEST (UTC+02:00) | Alegría 36', 61'; Musonda (yellow card) 63'; Adán (yellow card) 77'; Durmisi (yellow card) 79'; Giménez (yellow card) 85' (red card) 85'; Gutiérrez (yellow card) 88' | Report | Carcela 13', (yellow card) 81'; Bueno 33'; Vezo (yellow card) 52' (red card) 54'; Ponce (yellow card) 74'; Angban (yellow card) 80' | Stadium: Benito Villamarín; Attendance: 34,236; Referee: Carlos del Cerro Grande |

| 20 September 2016 5 | Sevilla | 1–0 | Betis | Seville |
| 22:00 CEST (UTC+02:00) | Vázquez (yellow card) 16'; Nasri (yellow card) 32'; Mercado 51', (yellow card) 85'; Sarabia (yellow card) 78'; Pareja (yellow card) 85' | Report | Petros (yellow card) 2'; Pezzella (yellow card) 11'; Piccini (yellow card) 40'; Bruno (yellow card) 85' | Stadium: Ramón Sánchez Pizjuán; Attendance: 39,849; Referee: Xavier Estrada Fernández |

| 23 September 2016 6 | Real Betis | 1–0 | Málaga | Seville |
| 20:45 CEST (UTC+02:00) | Joaquín 25'; González (yellow card) 47'; Petros (yellow card) 62'; Navarro (yellow card) 72'; Cejudo (yellow card) 90+1' | Report | Sandro (yellow card) 37'; Kuzmanović (yellow card) 45'; Jony (yellow card) 45'; Camacho (yellow card) 67'; Llorente (yellow card) 78'; Castro (yellow card) 89' | Stadium: Benito Villamarín; Attendance: 33,322; Referee: Alfonso Álvarez Izquierdo |

| 30 September 2016 7 | Real Sociedad | 1–0 | Real Betis | San Sebastián |
| 20:45 CEST (UTC+02:00) | I. Martínez (yellow card) 44'; Illarramendi (yellow card) 60'; Vela 63' | Report | Brašanac (yellow card) 46'; Bruno (yellow card) 54'; Joaquín (yellow card) 59' | Stadium: Anoeta; Attendance: 18,310; Referee: Daniel Trujillo Suárez |

| 15 October 2016 8 | Real Betis | 1–6 | Real Madrid | Seville |
| 20:45 CEST (UTC+02:00) | Pezzella (yellow card) 49'; Cejudo 55', (yellow card) 64'; Zozulya (yellow card) 77'; Petros (yellow card) 90+1' | Report | Varane 4'; Benzema 31'; Marcelo 39'; Isco (yellow card) 43', (goal) 45', 62'; Ronaldo 78' | Stadium: Benito Villamarín; Attendance: 37,209; Referee: Jesús Gil Manzano |

| 21 October 2016 9 | Osasuna | 1–2 | Real Betis | Pamplona |
| 20:45 CEST (UTC+02:00) | D. García (yellow card) 45+1'; Torres 48', (yellow card) 58'; De las Cuevas (yellow card) 57'; Rivière (red card) 87' | Report | Joaquín 19'; Brašanac (yellow card) 86'; Cejudo (yellow card) 88'; Gutiérrez 90+1' | Stadium: El Sadar; Attendance: 15,105; Referee: Carlos del Cerro Grande |

| 30 October 2016 10 | Real Betis | 0–1 | Espanyol | Seville |
| 18:30 CEST (UTC+02:00) | Pezzella (yellow card) 28'; Martin (yellow card) 54'; Gutiérrez (yellow card) 69' | Report | Pérez (yellow card) 55'; Reyes 62'; Piatti (yellow card) 66'; Sánchez (yellow card) 79' | Stadium: Benito Villamarín; Attendance: 38,282; Referee: Ricardo de Burgos Bengoetxea |

| 6 November 2016 11 | Villarreal | 2–0 | Real Betis | Vilarreal |
| 18:30 CET (UTC+01:00) | Trigueros 22'; Soriano 53' | Report | Cejudo (yellow card) 72'; Martin (yellow card) 79' | Stadium: El Madrigal; Attendance: 18,826; Referee: Iñaki Vicandi Garrido |

| 18 November 2016 12 | Real Betis | 2–0 | Las Palmas | Las Palmas |
| 18:30 CET (UTC+01:00) | González 27'; Mandi 45+2' | Report | Gómez (yellow card) 88' | Stadium: Gran Canaria; Attendance: 34,114; Referee: José González González |

| 25 November 2016 13 | Eibar | 3–1 | Real Betis | Eibar |
| 20:45 CET (UTC+01:00) | Pedro León 19'; Enrich 23'; Kike 90+2' | Report | Piccini (red card) 17'; Bruno (yellow card) 72'; Castro 84' | Stadium: Ipurua Municipal Stadium; Attendance: 5,146; Referee: Daniel Ocón Arráiz |

| 4 December 2016 14 | Real Betis | 3–3 | Celta Vigo | Seville |
| 12:00 CEST | Donk (yellow card) 11'; Petros (yellow card) 25' (yellow-red card) 90+2'; Castro 41' (pen.); Sanabria 53', (yellow card) 59'; Pezzella 73', (yellow card) 89'; Gutiérrez (yellow card) 77' | Report | Aspas 15', 61'; Roncaglia 85'; Cabral (yellow card) 89' | Stadium: Benito Villamarín; Attendance: 27,241; Referee: José María Sánchez Martínez |

| 11 December 2016 15 | Real Betis | 1–0 | Athletic Bilbao | Seville |
| 20:45 CET (UTC+01:00) | Piccini (yellow card) 15'; Castro (yellow card) 16', (goal) 18'; Cejudo (yellow card) 74' | Report | Laporte (yellow card) 3'; García (yellow card) 47' | Stadium: Benito Villamarín; Attendance: 34,481; Referee: Antonio Mateu Lahoz |

| 16 December 2016 16 | Alavés | 1–0 | Real Betis | Vitoria-Gasteiz |
| 20:45 CET (UTC+01:00) | Deyverson (yellow card) 18', (goal) 58'; Camarasa (yellow card) 35'; Llorente (yellow card) 53'; Hernandez (yellow card) 55'; Pacheco (yellow card) 73'; M. García (yellow card) 90+4' | [www.laliga.es/directo/temporada-2016-2017/laliga-santander/16/alaves_betis Report] | Ceballos (yellow card) 55' | Stadium: Mendizorrotza; Attendance: 18,067; Referee: Ignacio Iglesias Villanueva |

| 8 January 2016 17 | Real Betis | 2–0 | Leganés | Seville |
| 16:15 CET (UTC+01:00) | Petros (yellow card) 30'; Castro 51'; Bruno (yellow card) 58'; Piccini 85' | Report | Mantovani (yellow card) 14'; Alberto Martín (yellow card) 37'; López (yellow card) 60'; Ramos (yellow card) 74'; Bustinza (yellow card) 78'; Pérez (yellow card) 82' | Stadium: Benito Villamarín; Attendance: 36,328; Referee: Xavier Estrada Fernández |

| 14 January 2017 18 | Atlético Madrid | 1–0 | Real Betis | Madrid |
| 18:30 CET (UTC+01:00) | Gaitán 8' | Report | Piccini (yellow card) 61'; Alegría (yellow card) 79'; Ceballos (yellow card) 89' | Stadium: Vicente Calderón; Attendance: 46,043; Referee: Carlos Clos Gómez |

| 22 January 2017 19 | Real Betis | 0–0 | Sporting Gijón | Seville |
| 18:30 CET (UTC+01:00) | Ceballos (yellow card) 59'; Bruno (yellow card) 90+3' | Summary | Babin (yellow card) 21'; Lillo (yellow card) 84' | Stadium: Benito Villamarín; Attendance: 35,097; Referee: Alberto Undiano Mallenco |

| 29 January 2017 20 | Real Betis | 1–1 | Barcelona | Seville |
| 12:00 CET | Petros (yellow card) 67'; Alegría 75'; Castro (yellow card) 78' | Report | Piqué (yellow card) 43'; Rakitić (yellow card) 70'; Gomes (yellow card) 78'; L. Suárez 90' | Stadium: Benito Villamarín; Attendance: 43,790; Referee: Alejandro Hernández Hernández |

| 11 February 2017 21 | Real Betis | 0–0 | Valencia | Seville |
| 13:00 CET | Mandi (yellow card) 63'; Pezzella (yellow card) 87'; Ceballos (yellow card) 89'; Sanabria (yellow card) 89' | Report | Santos (yellow card) 21'; Parejo (yellow card) 57'; Zaza (yellow card) 78' | Stadium: Benito Villamarín; Attendance: 30,567; Referee: (Spain) Daniel Trujillo |

| 17 February 2017 22 | Granada | 4–1 | Real Betis | Granada |
| 20:45 CET | Carcela 18'; Ramos 28', 64', (yellow card) 62'; Pereira 33', (yellow card) 55' (red card) 66'; Wakaso (yellow card) 40'; Agbo (yellow card) 81' | Report | Martin (yellow card) 49'; Matías Nahuel (red card) 66'; Petros 75' | Stadium: Los Cármenes; Attendance: 15,927; Referee: Daniel Ocón Arráiz |

| 25 February 2017 23 | Real Betis | 1–2 | Sevilla | Seville |
| 16:15 CET | Durmisi 36'; Tosca (yellow card) 45'; Piccini (yellow card) 87'; Martin (yellow card) 90+3' | Report | Nzonzi (yellow card) 35'; Sarabia (yellow card) 43'; Mercado 56'; Iborra 76'; Pareja (yellow card) 90' | Stadium: Benito Villamarín; Attendance: 37,110; Referee: Carlos del Cerro Grande |

| 28 February 2017 24 | Málaga | 1–2 | Real Betis | Málaga |
| 21:30 CET | Fornals 39'; Torres (yellow card) 68'; Jony (yellow card) 76'; Juan Carlos (yellow card) 90+4' | Report | Pezzella (yellow card) 36'; Martin 48'; Brašanac (yellow card) 60'; Bruno (yellow card) 63'; Sanabria 74'; Cejudo (yellow card) 82'; Adán (yellow card) 90+3' | Stadium: La Rosaleda; Attendance: 24,343; Referee: Alejandro Hernández Hernández |

| 3 March 2017 25 | Real Betis | 2–3 | Real Sociedad | Seville |
| 20:45 CET | Mandi 16'; Pezzella (yellow card) 55'; Sanabria 65'; Joaquín (yellow card) 79'; Donk (yellow card) 90+4'; Ceballos (yellow card) 90+4' | Report | Bautista 9'; Prieto 26', 72'; Berchiche (yellow card) 40'; Illarramendi (yellow card) 78' | Stadium: Benito Villamarín; Referee: Ignacio Iglesias Villanueva |

| 8 March 2017 26 | Deportivo La Coruña | 1–1 | Real Betis | A Coruña |
| 18:45 CET | Gil (yellow card) 21'; Andone (yellow card) 33'; Mosquera (yellow card) 86'; Borges 90+3'; Albentosa (yellow card) 90+4' | Report | Donk (yellow card) 35'; Pardo (yellow card) 40'; Ceballos (yellow card) 52'; Piccini 70'; Adán (yellow card) 90'; Pezzella (yellow card) 90+1'; Mandi (yellow card) 90+2'; Martínez (yellow card) 90+5' | Stadium: Riazor; Attendance: 21,450; Referee: Alfonso Álvarez Izquierdo |

| 12 March 2017 27 | Real Madrid | 2–1 | Real Betis | Madrid |
| 20:45 CET | Ronaldo 41'; Ramos 81'; Marcelo (yellow card) 87' | Report | Sanabria 24'; Piccini (yellow card) 30' (yellow-red card) 78' | Stadium: Santiago Bernabéu; Attendance: 69,206; Referee: Antonio Mateu Lahoz |

| 18 March 2017 28 | Real Betis | 2–0 | Osasuna | Seville |
| 20:45 CET | Navarro 4'; Castro 28' | Report | Kodro (yellow card) 8'; Mérida (yellow card) 51'; Buñuel (yellow card) 60' | Stadium: Benito Villamarín; Attendance: 32,375; Referee: Alfonso Álvarez Izquierdo |

| 31 March 2017 29 | Espanyol | 2–1 | Real Betis | Barcelona |
| 20:45 CEST | Fuego (yellow card) 76', (goal) 87'; J. López (yellow card) 82'; Gerard (yellow card) 88'; J. Reyes 90' | Report | Castro 78' (pen.); Petros (yellow card) 87'; Navarro (yellow card) 90' | Stadium: RCDE Stadium; Attendance: 21,090; Referee: José González González |

| 4 April 2017 30 | Real Betis | 0–1 | Villarreal | Seville |
| 21:30 CEST | Brašanac (yellow card) 39'; Durmisi (yellow card) 73' | Report | Adrián 47'; Ruiz (yellow card) 66'; Dos Santos (yellow card) 70' | Stadium: Benito Villamarín; Attendance: 25,477; Referee: Jesús Gil Manzano |

| 9 April 2017 31 | Las Palmas | 4–1 | Real Betis | Las Palmas |
| 20:45 CEST | Boateng (yellow card) 29', (goal) 49'; Lemos (yellow card) 30'; Gómez (yellow card) 38', (goal) 44'; Viera 62'; Jesé 83' (pen.) | Report | Toșca (yellow card) 58'; Mandi (yellow card) 65'; Pezzella (yellow card) 74'; Navarro 88', (yellow card) 90+3' | Stadium: Gran Canaria; Attendance: 19,769; Referee: José María Sánchez Martínez |

| 16 April 2017 32 | Real Betis | 2–0 | Eibar | Seville |
| 18:30 CEST | Martin 2', (yellow card) 21'; Bruno (yellow card) 23'; Pezella (yellow card) 69'; Pardo (yellow card) 80'; Ceballos 89' | Report | Capa (yellow card) 36'; Lejeune (yellow card) 65'; García (yellow card) 75'; Kike (yellow card) 85' | Stadium: Benito Villamarín; Attendance: 30,331; Referee: Antonio Mateu Lahoz |

| 23 April 2017 33 | Celta Vigo | 0–1 | Real Betis | Vigo |
| 16:15 CEST | Planas (yellow card) 61'; Wass (yellow card) 79'; Díaz (yellow card) 81' | Report | Durmisi (yellow card) 27'; Brašanac 54'; Bruno (yellow card) 71'; Ceballos (yellow card) 80'; Navarro (yellow card) 86'; Cejudo (yellow card) 90+4' | Stadium: Balaídos; Attendance: 15,739; Referee: Ricardo de Burgos Bengoetxea |

| 27 April 2017 34 | Athletic Bilbao | 2–1 | Real Betis | Bilbao |
| 21:30 CEST | Susaeta (yellow card) 8'; Aduriz 53' (pen.); Muniain 60' | Report | Brašanac (yellow card) 13'; Mandi (yellow card) 58'; Castro 63'; Adán (yellow card) 72' | Stadium: San Mamés; Attendance: 34,301; Referee: José González González |

| 30 April 2017 35 | Real Betis | 1–4 | Alavés | Seville |
| 16:15 CEST | Pardo 12'; Alegría (yellow card) 88' | Report | Alexis (yellow card) 19'; Romero (yellow card) 19'; Torres (yellow card) 24'; Krstičić 48', (yellow card) 81'; Sobrino 54'; Santos 58'; Édgar (yellow card) 90+3'; Katai 90+4' | Stadium: Benito Villamarín; Attendance: 22,271; Referee: Daniel Ocón Arráiz |

| 8 May 2017 36 | Leganés | 4–0 | Real Betis | Leganés |
| 20:45 CEST | Szymanowski 7' (pen.), 80'; El Zhar 15'; Tito (yellow card) 43'; Gabriel 65'; Siovas (yellow card) 76'; Luciano (yellow card) 90+1' | Report | | Stadium: Butarque; Attendance: 9,443; Referee: Daniel Trujillo Suárez |

| 14 May 2017 37 | Real Betis | 1–1 | Atlético Madrid | Seville |
| 20:00 CEST | Brašanac (yellow card) 28'; Ceballos 57'; Petros (yellow card) 66'; Adán (yellow card) 67'; Martínez (yellow card) 90+1' | Report | Filipe Luís (yellow card) 36'; Giménez (yellow card) 42'; Koke (yellow card) 55'; Savić (yellow card) 60', (goal) 66' | Stadium: Benito Villamarín; Attendance: 27,159; Referee: Alfonso Álvarez Izquierdo |

| 20 May 2017 38 | Sporting Gijón | 2–2 | Real Betis | Gijón |
| 17:00 | Douglas 7'; Carmona 79' | Summary | Castro 22', 59'; Cejudo (yellow card) 37'; Durmisi (yellow card) 86' | Stadium: El Molinón; Attendance: 15,365; Referee: Ignacio Iglesias Villanueva |

=== Copa del Rey ===
==== Round of 32 ====
| 29 November 2016 First leg | Real Betis | 1–0 | Deportivo La Coruña | Seville |
| 22:00 CET (UTC+01:00) | Sanabria 19'; Martin (yellow card) 36'; Brašanac (yellow card) 86' | Report | Bergantiños (yellow card) 73'; Luisinho (yellow card) 79' | Stadium: Benito Villamarín; Attendance: 18,774; Referee: Ricardo de Burgos Bengoetxea |

| 21 December 2016 Second leg | Deportivo La Coruña | 3–1 (3–2 agg.) | Real Betis | A Coruña |
| 21:00 CET (UTC+01:00) | Arribas 11'; Luisinho 54'; Babel 59'; Joselu (yellow card) 80' | Report | Bruno (yellow card) 57'; Piccini 66', (yellow card) 76'; Ceballos (yellow card) 77' | Stadium: Riazor; Attendance: 17,145; Referee: José González González |

== Statistics ==
=== Appearances and goals ===
Last updated on 20 May 2017.

| No. | Pos | Nat | Player | Total | | La Liga | | Copa del Rey | |
| No. | Pos | Nat | Player | Apps | Goals | Apps | Goals | Apps | Goals |
Goalkeepers
| 1 | GK | (Spain) ESP | Dani Giménez | 3 | 0 | 1 | 0 | 2 | 0 |
| 13 | GK | (Spain) ESP | Antonio Adán | 37 | 0 | 37 | 0 | 0 | 0 |
| 25 | GK | (Spain) ESP | Manu Herrera | 0 | 0 | 0 | 0 | 0 | 0 |
Defenders
| 3 | DF | (Spain) ESP | Álex Martínez | 14 | 0 | 11+3 | 0 | 0 | 0 |
| 4 | DF | (Spain) ESP | Bruno | 18 | 1 | 15+1 | 1 | 1+1 | 0 |
| 12 | DF | (Italy) ITA | Cristiano Piccini | 25 | 3 | 21+2 | 2 | 2 | 1 |
| 14 | DF | (Denmark) DEN | Riza Durmisi | 29 | 1 | 27 | 1 | 2 | 0 |
| 20 | DF | (Argentina) ARG | Germán Pezzella | 37 | 1 | 36 | 1 | 1 | 0 |
| 21 | DF | (Romania) ROU | Alin Toșca | 17 | 0 | 17 | 0 | 0 | 0 |
| 23 | DF | (Algeria) ALG | Aïssa Mandi | 28 | 2 | 25+1 | 2 | 2 | 0 |
| 27 | DF | (Spain) ESP | Rafa Navarro | 18 | 2 | 14+4 | 2 | 0 | 0 |
| 28 | DF | (Spain) ESP | José Carlos | 7 | 0 | 6 | 0 | 1 | 0 |
Midfielders
| 5 | MF | (Brazil) BRA | Petros | 33 | 1 | 24+8 | 1 | 1 | 0 |
| 6 | MF | (Chile) CHI | Felipe Gutiérrez | 16 | 1 | 9+5 | 1 | 1+1 | 0 |
| 7 | MF | (Spain) ESP | Rubén Pardo | 16 | 1 | 15+1 | 1 | 0 | 0 |
| 8 | MF | (France) FRA | Jonas Martin | 22 | 2 | 15+5 | 2 | 1+1 | 0 |
| 10 | MF | (Spain) ESP | Dani Ceballos | 31 | 2 | 24+6 | 2 | 1 | 0 |
| 11 | MF | (Spain) ESP | Matías Nahuel | 10 | 0 | 0+10 | 0 | 0 | 0 |
| 15 | MF | (Netherlands) NED | Ryan Donk | 18 | 0 | 9+7 | 0 | 2 | 0 |
| 16 | MF | (Spain) ESP | Álvaro Cejudo | 17 | 1 | 6+11 | 1 | 0 | 0 |
| 17 | MF | (Spain) ESP | Joaquín | 29 | 3 | 19+9 | 3 | 0+1 | 0 |
| 22 | MF | (Serbia) SRB | Darko Brašanac | 26 | 1 | 19+6 | 1 | 1 | 0 |
Forwards
| 9 | FW | (Paraguay) PAR | Antonio Sanabria | 24 | 5 | 16+6 | 4 | 2 | 1 |
| 18 | FW | (Ukraine) UKR | Roman Zozulya | 6 | 0 | 1+5 | 0 | 0 | 0 |
| 19 | FW | (Spain) ESP | Álex Alegría | 27 | 3 | 15+10 | 3 | 2 | 0 |
| 24 | FW | (Spain) ESP | Rubén Castro | 36 | 13 | 32+3 | 13 | 0+1 | 0 |
Players who have made an appearance or had a squad number this season but have left the club either permanently or on loan
| 7 | MF | (Belgium) BEL | Charly Musonda | 8 | 0 | 1+7 | 0 | 0 | 0 |
| 21 | MF | (Spain) ESP | Fabián | 5 | 0 | 3+1 | 0 | 0+1 | 0 |
