= Álex Alegría =

Spanish footballer (born 1992)

Personal information
- Full name: Alexander Alegría Moreno
- Date of birth: 10 October 1992 (age 34)
- Place of birth: Plasencia, Spain
- Height: 1.90 m (6 ft 3 in)
- Position: Forward

Team information
- Current team: Badajoz

Youth career
- San Miguel
- Plasencia
- 2010: Cacereño

Senior career*
Years	Team	Apps	(Gls)
2010–2012	Cacereño	56	(11)
2012–2015	Betis B	93	(26)
2015–2019	Betis	26	(3)
2015–2016	→ Numancia (loan)	41	(12)
2017–2018	→ Levante (loan)	9	(0)
2018–2019	→ Rayo Vallecano (loan)	9	(0)
2019	→ Sporting Gijón (loan)	16	(3)
2019–2023	Mallorca	19	(0)
2020	→ Extremadura (loan)	17	(6)
2021	→ Zaragoza (loan)	15	(1)
2021–2022	→ Burgos (loan)	25	(0)
2022–2023	→ Fuenlabrada (loan)	16	(1)
2023	Foolad	7	(1)
2024–	Badajoz	65	(17)
- * Club domestic league appearances and goals as of 22:38, 25 February 2026 (UTC)

Alexander "Álex" Alegría Moreno (born 10 October 1992) is a Spanish professional footballer who plays as a forward for Tercera Federación club Badajoz.

== Club career ==
=== Betis ===
Born in Plasencia, Province of Cáceres, Extremadura, Alegría finished his development with CP Cacereño, and made his senior debut in the Segunda División B during the 2010–11 season. On 18 July 2012, he signed a two-year contract with Real Betis, being assigned to the reserves also in the third division.

Alegría agreed to a new deal with the Andalusians on 11 July 2014 after scoring nine goals in the 2013–14 campaign. He made his professional debut on 1 March 2015, coming on as a second half substitute for Francisco Portillo in a 0–0 away draw against CD Mirandés in the Segunda División.

On 8 July 2015, Alegría renewed his link until 2017, being immediately loaned to CD Numancia of the second tier. He appeared in his first match for the club on 23 August, playing 12 minutes and scoring a brace in the 6–3 home win over CD Tenerife.

On 15 June 2016, after 42 competitive games at the Nuevo Estadio Los Pajaritos, Alegría was definitively promoted to Betis' first team. He made his debut in La Liga on 11 September of that year, starting in a 3–2 away victory against Valencia CF.

Alegría scored his first goals in the Spanish top flight on 16 September 2016, a brace in a 2–2 home draw with Granada CF. The following 29 January, he put the hosts ahead in an eventual 1–1 draw against FC Barcelona also at the Estadio Benito Villamarín.

On 29 June 2017, Alegría was loaned to fellow top-division club Levante UD for one year. He suffered a knee injury in November, being sidelined for the remainder of the campaign.

On 31 August 2018, Alegría joined Rayo Vallecano on a one-year loan. The following 31 January, however, he moved to Sporting de Gijón also in a temporary deal.

=== Mallorca ===
On 2 July 2019, Alegría agreed to a five-year contract with RCD Mallorca as a free agent. The following 24 January, after being sparingly used, he moved to second division side Extremadura UD on loan for the remainder of the campaign.

Alegría signed with Real Zaragoza also in the second tier on 19 January 2021, on loan until the end of the season. On 18 August, he joined Burgos CF of the same league also in a temporary deal.

On 1 September 2022, Alegría moved to Primera Federación club CF Fuenlabrada on a one-year loan. This arrangement was terminated in January 2023, and he left Mallorca shortly after.

== Career statistics ==
As of match played 23 August 2021

Appearances and goals by club, season and competition
Club	Season	League			National Cup		Other		Total	
Club	Season	Division	Apps	Goals	Apps	Goals	Apps	Goals	Apps	Goals
Cacereño	2010–11	Segunda División B	20	2	0	0	—		20	2
Cacereño	2011–12	Segunda División B	36	9	0	0	—		36	9
Cacereño	Total		56	11	0	0	0	0	56	11
Betis B	2012–13	Segunda División B	35	3	—		—		35	3
Betis B	2013–14	Tercera División	23	9	—		2 (Note: Appearances in Tercera División promotion playoffs)	0	25	9
Betis B	2014–15	Segunda División B	35	14	—		—		35	14
Betis B	Total		93	26	0	0	2	0	95	26
Betis	2014–15	Segunda División	1	0	0	0	—		1	0
Betis	2016–17	La Liga	25	3	2	0	—		27	3
Betis	Total		26	3	2	0	0	0	28	3
Numancia (loan)	2015–16	Segunda División	41	12	1	0	—		42	12
Levante (loan)	2017–18	La Liga	9	0	0	0	—		9	0
Rayo Vallecano (loan)	2018–19	La Liga	9	0	2	1	—		11	1
Sporting Gijón (loan)	2018–19	Segunda División	16	3	0	0	—		16	3
Mallorca	2019–20	La Liga	6	0	2	0	—		8	0
Mallorca	2020–21	Segunda División	13	0	2	0	—		15	0
Mallorca	Total		19	0	4	0	0	0	23	0
Extremadura (loan)	2019–20	Segunda División	17	6	0	0	—		17	6
Zaragoza (loan)	2020–21	Segunda División	15	1	0	0	—		15	1
Burgos (loan)	2021–22	Segunda División	1	0	0	0	—		1	0
Career total			302	62	9	1	2	0	313	63
