= 2014–15 Real Betis season =

Real Betis
2014–15 season
- President: Juan Carlos Ollero
- Head coach: Pepe Mel
- Stadium: Estadio Benito Villamarín
- Segunda División: 1st (promoted)
- Copa del Rey: Round of 32
- Top goalscorer: League: Rubén Castro (32); All: Rubén Castro (33)
Home colours	Away colours

The 2014–15 season was Real Betis' 106th season in existence. The club played in the Segunda División after enjoying a three-year spell in the Spanish top flight.

== Players ==
=== First-team squad ===
Note: Flags indicate national team as defined under FIFA eligibility rules; some limited exceptions apply. Players may hold more than one non-FIFA nationality.

No.	Pos.	Nation	Player
1	GK	ESP	Dani Giménez
2	DF	ESP	Francisco Molinero
3	DF	ESP	Álex Martínez
4	DF	ESP	Bruno González
5	MF	ESP	Javier Matilla
6	DF	ESP	Jordi Figueras
7	MF	ESP	Álvaro Vadillo
8	FW	ITA	Vincenzo Rennella
10	MF	ESP	Nono
11	MF	ALG	Foued Kadir (on loan from Marseille)
12	DF	ITA	Cristiano Piccini

No.	Pos.	Nation	Player
13	GK	ESP	Antonio Adán
14	MF	ESP	Xavi Torres
15	MF	ESP	Sergio
16	MF	ESP	Álvaro Cejudo
17	FW	ESP	Dani Pacheco
18	MF	SEN	Alfred N'Diaye
19	FW	ESP	Jorge Molina
20	DF	POL	Damien Perquis
21	MF	CHI	Lorenzo Reyes
23	DF	ESP	Jorge Casado
24	FW	ESP	Rubén Castro

=== Youth players ===
Note: Flags indicate national team as defined under FIFA eligibility rules; some limited exceptions apply. Players may hold more than one non-FIFA nationality.

No.	Pos.	Nation	Player
36	DF	ESP	José Caro
41	GK	ESP	Pedro

=== Out on loan ===
Note: Flags indicate national team as defined under FIFA eligibility rules; some limited exceptions apply. Players may hold more than one non-FIFA nationality.

No.	Pos.	Nation	Player
—	DF	ESP	Juanfran (at Deportivo La Coruña)
—	MF	COD	Cedric Mabwati (at Osasuna)
—	FW	URU	Braian Rodríguez (at Numancia)
—	FW	ESP	Chuli (at Zaragoza)

== Competitions ==
=== Segunda División ===
==== League table ====
Pos	Team	Pld	W	D	L	GF	GA	GD	Pts	Promotion, qualification or relegation
1	Real Betis (C, P)	42	25	9	8	73	40	+33	84	Promotion to La Liga
2	Sporting Gijón (P)	42	21	19	2	57	27	+30	82 (Note: Sporting Gijón finished ahead of Girona on goal difference; Sporting de Gijón +30, Girona +28)	Promotion to La Liga
3	Girona	42	24	10	8	63	35	+28	82	Qualification to promotion play-offs
4	Las Palmas (O, P)	42	22	12	8	73	47	+26	78	Qualification to promotion play-offs
5	Valladolid	42	21	9	12	65	40	+25	72	Qualification to promotion play-offs

Source: LFP - Liga Adelante
Rules for classification: 1) points; 2) head-to-head points; 3) head-to-head goal difference; 4) goal difference; 5) number of goals scored
(C) Champions; (O) Play-off winners; (P) Promoted

==== Results by round ====
Round	1	2	3	4	5	6	7	8	9	10	11	12	13	14	15	16	17	18	19	20	21	22	23	24	25	26	27	28	29	30	31	32	33	34	35	36	37	38	39	40	41	42
Ground	A	H	A	H	A	H	A	H	A	H	A	H	A	H	A	H	A	H	A	H	A	H	A	H	A	H	A	H	A	H	A	H	A	H	A	H	A	H	A	H	A	H
Result	W	W	L	L	W	W	D	D	L	W	L	W	D	L	W	W	W	W	D	W	W	W	D	D	D	W	D	W	W	L	W	W	W	W	W	D	W	W	W	W	L	L
Position	4	1	8	9	8	5	5	7	9	7	7	5	6	6	5	5	4	3	5	4	2	2	4	5	5	3	5	2	1	1	1	1	1	1	1	1	1	1	1	1	1	1

Source: Competitive matches
A = Away; H = Home; W = Win; D = Draw; L = Loss

==== Matches ====
24 August 2014 1	Sabadell	2–3	Real Betis	Sabadell
20:00	Edgar 87'; Tamudo 89'	Report	Cejudo 21'; Matilla 33'; Castro 77'	Stadium: Estadi de la Nova Creu Alta; Attendance: 8,074

31 August 2014 2	Real Betis	2–1	Numancia	Sevilla
18:15	Castro 5', 77'	Report	Palanca 22'	Stadium: Estadio Benito Villamarin; Attendance: 30,000

7 September 2014 3	Ponferradina	4–1	Real Betis	Ponferrada
12:00	Yuri 48', 59', 76'; Acorán 56'	Report	Molina 28'	Stadium: Estadio El Tolarín; Attendance: 6,000

14 September 2014 4	Real Betis	0–1	Albacete	Sevilla
18:15		Report	Chumbi 66'	Stadium: Estadio Benito Villamarin; Attendance: 30,049

21 September 2014 5	Girona	1–3	Real Betis	Girona
17:00	Sanchón 12'	Report	Castro 20', 69'; Lejeune 27' (o.g.)	Stadium: Estadi Montilivi; Attendance: 7,284

28 September 2014 6	Real Betis	2–0	Mirandés	Sevilla
18:15	Castro 28', 54'	Report		Stadium: Estadio Benito Villamarin; Attendance: 30,203

5 October 2014 7	Valladolid	0–0	Real Betis	Valladolid
12:00		Report		Stadium: Estadio Nuevo José Zorrilla; Attendance: 16,800

12 October 2014 8	Real Betis	0–0	Las Palmas	Sevilla
12:00		Report		Stadium: Estadio Benito Villamarin; Attendance: 30,312

19 October 2014 9	Leganés	1–0	Real Betis	Leganés
18:15	Velasco 88'	Report		Stadium: Estadio Municipal de Butarque; Attendance: 8,000

25 October 2014 10	Real Betis	3–2	Recreativo	Sevilla
18:15	Rennella 9'; Castro 42' (pen.); Kadir 64' (pen.)	Report	Montoro 11'; Núñez 67'	Stadium: Estadio Benito Villamarin; Attendance: 26,087

2 November 2014 11	Osasuna	3–2	Real Betis	Pamplona
12:00	Nekounam 49'; Flaño 61'; Onwu 87'	Report	Castro 13'; Rennella 33'	Stadium: El Sadar Stadium; Attendance: 13,643

8 November 2014 12	Real Betis	1–0	Barcelona B	Sevilla
18:00	Rubén Castro 50'	Report		Stadium: Estadio Benito Villamarin; Attendance: 27,487

16 November 2014 13	Zaragoza	2–2	Real Betis	Zaragoza
20:00	Willian José 54' (pen.); Pedro 63'	Report	Rennella 35'; Cabrera 57' (o.g.)	Stadium: La Romareda; Attendance: 15,000

23 November 2014 14	Real Betis	1–2	Alavés	Sevilla
18:15	Castro 53' (pen.)	Report	Juli 16'; García 26'	Stadium: Estadio Benito Villamarin; Attendance: 35,000

29 November 2014 15	Llagostera	0–2	Real Betis	Palamós
18:15		Report	Castro 54'; Rennella 79'	Stadium: Estadi Palamós; Attendance: 3,568

8 December 2014 16	Real Betis	1–0	Mallorca	Sevilla
18:15	Rennella 55'	Report		Stadium: Estadio Benito Villamarin; Attendance: 25,007

13 December 2014 17	Lugo	0–1	Real Betis	Lugo
18:15		Report	Castro 59'	Stadium: Estadio Anxo Carro; Attendance: 2,600

21 December 2014 18	Real Betis	2–0	Racing Santander	Sevilla
12:00	Ceballos 3'; Molina 90+4'	Report		Stadium: Estadio Benito Villamarin; Attendance: 27,238

4 January 2015 19	Alcorcón	0–0	Real Betis	Alcorcón
18:15		Report		Stadium: Santo Domingo; Attendance: 4,336

10 January 2015 20	Real Betis	3–1	Tenerife	Sevilla
20:00	Castro 44' (pen.), 69'; Molina 80'	Report	Ifrán 55'	Stadium: Estadio Benito Villamarin; Attendance: 30,054

18 January 2015 21	Sporting de Gijón	1–2	Real Betis	Gijón
12:00	Muñiz 5'	Report	Bruno 52'; Torres 64'	Stadium: El Molinón; Attendance: 20,095

24 January 2015 22	Real Betis	2–0	Sabadell	Sevilla
18:00	Ceballos 9'; Molina 32'	Report		Stadium: Estadio Benito Villamarin; Attendance: 30,000

31 January 2015 23	Numancia	1–1	Real Betis	Soria
18:15	Regalón 17'	Report	Castro 27'	Stadium: Nuevo Estadio Los Pajaritos; Attendance: 2,846

8 February 2015 24	Real Betis	1–1	Ponferradina	Sevilla
18:15	Molina 33'	Report	Yuri 90+3'	Stadium: Estadio Benito Villamarin; Attendance: 30,000

15 February 2015 25	Albacete	0–0	Real Betis	Albacete
18:15		Report		Stadium: Estadio Carlos Belmonte; Attendance: 10,671

21 February 2015 26	Real Betis	2–1	Girona	Sevilla
20:00	Molina 61'; Ceballos 87'	Report	Granell 90'	Stadium: Estadio Benito Villamarin

1 March 2015 27	Mirandés	0–0	Real Betis	Miranda de Ebro
18:15		Report	Bruno (yellow card) 45' (yellow-red card) 90'	Stadium: Estadio Municipal de Anduva; Attendance: 3,889

8 March 2015 28	Real Betis	4–0	Valladolid	Sevilla
12:00	Molina 37'; Castro 53', 82' (pen.), 84'	Report		Stadium: Estadio Benito Villamarin

15 March 2015 29	Las Palmas	0–3	Real Betis	Las Palmas de Gran Canaria
12:00		Report	Molina 65', 73'; Ceballos 76'	Stadium: Estadio Gran Canaria

21 March 2015 30	Real Betis	1–3	Leganés	Sevilla
18:15	Molina 73'	Report	Eraso 22'; Bertrán 45+2'; Postigo 48'	Stadium: Estadio Benito Villamarin

28 March 2015 31	Recreativo	0–1	Real Betis	Huelva
18:15		Report	Torres 52'	Stadium: Estadio Nuevo Colombino

5 April 2015 32	Real Betis	3–0	Osasuna	Sevilla
12:00	N'Diaye 61'; Castro 67'; Molina 88'	Report		Stadium: Estadio Benito Villamarin

12 April 2015 33	Barcelona B	1–2	Real Betis	Barcelona
17:00	Ramírez 3'	Report	Ceballos 19'; Molina 70'	Stadium: Mini Estadi

19 April 2015 34	Real Betis	4–0	Zaragoza	Sevilla
12:00	Molina 28', 64'; Castro 52', 89'	Report		Stadium: Estadio Benito Villamarin

25 April 2015 35	Alavés	1–2	Real Betis	Vitoria
18:15	Toti 82'	Report	Molina 15'; Castro 73'	Stadium: Mendizorroza

2 May 2015 36	Real Betis	2–2	Llagostera	Sevilla
18:15	Castro 46', 70'	Report	Juanjo 38'; Tito 77'	Stadium: Estadio Benito Villamarin

10 May 2015 37	Mallorca	1–2	Real Betis	Palma de Mallorca
12:00	Xisco 36'	Report	Castro 16'; Molina 33'	Stadium: Iberostar Stadium

17 May 2015 38	Real Betis	5–1	Lugo	Sevilla
18:15	Castro 13', 57'; Molina 42'; Molinero 52'; Rennella 90'	Report	Peña 22'	Stadium: Estadio Benito Villamarin

21 May 2015 39	Racing Santander	2–4	Real Betis	Santander
20:00	Sylla 22'; Concha 74'	Report	Bruno 25'; Castro 41', 50'; Molina 55'	Stadium: Estadio El Sardinero

24 May 2015 40	Real Betis	3–0	Alcorcón	Sevilla
20:00	Castro 21', 51' (pen.); Molina 65'	Report		Stadium: Estadio Benito Villamarin; Attendance: 48,462

31 May 2015 41	Tenerife	2–0	Real Betis	Santa Cruz de Tenerife
18:00	Santana 68'; Ifrán 80'	Report		Stadium: Estadio Heliodoro Rodríguez López

7 June 2015 42	Real Betis	0–3	Sporting de Gijón	Sevilla
18:00		Report	Guerrero 24'; Jony 60'; López 68'	Stadium: Estadio Benito Villamarin; Attendance: 26,000

=== Copa del Rey ===
==== Second round ====
10 September 2014	Real Betis	2–0	Llagostera	Seville
20:00	Matilla 46'; Rennella 55'	Report		Stadium: Estadio Benito Villamarin

==== Third round ====
15 October 2014	Real Betis	0–0 (a.e.t.) (5–4 p)	Lugo	Seville
22:00		Report		Stadium: Estadio Benito Villamarin
	Penalties
	Castro (penalty scored); Matilla (penalty scored); Kadir (penalty scored); Rennella (penalty scored); Cejudo (penalty scored)		Fernández (penalty scored); Aganzo (penalty scored); Lolo (penalty scored); García (penalty scored); López (penalty missed)

==== Round of 32 ====
5 December 2014 First leg	Real Betis	3–4	Almería	Seville
22:00	Castro 80'; Perquis 86'; Molina 90'	Report	Mané 3'; Teerasil 5'; Quique 29'; Edgar 61'	Stadium: Estadio Benito Villamarin; Attendance: 3,000

16 December 2014 Second leg	Almería	2–1 (6–4 agg.)	Real Betis	Almería
22:00	Michel 59'; Jonathan 74'	Report	Perquis 78'	Stadium: Estadio Benito Villamarin; Attendance: 4,133
