= Cristiano Piccini =

Italian footballer (born 1992)

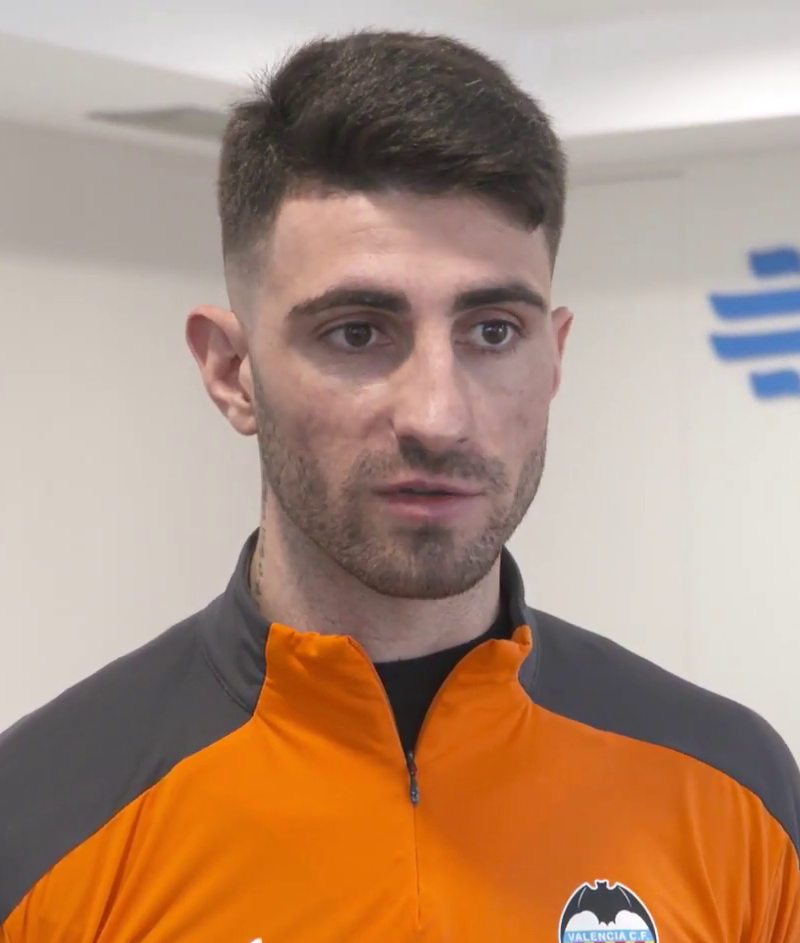
- Piccini with Valencia in 2021

Personal information
- Date of birth: 26 September 1992 (age 34)
- Place of birth: Florence, Italy
- Height: 1.90 m (6 ft 3 in)
- Position: Defender

Youth career
- 1997–2002: Sporting Arno
- 2002–2011: Fiorentina

Senior career*
Years	Team	Apps	(Gls)
2010–2015	Fiorentina	1	(0)
2011–2012	→ Carrarese (loan)	32	(1)
2012–2013	→ Spezia (loan)	30	(0)
2013–2014	→ Livorno (loan)	20	(0)
2014–2015	→ Betis (loan)	12	(0)
2015–2017	Betis	39	(2)
2017–2018	Sporting CP	24	(0)
2018–2022	Valencia	34	(2)
2020–2021	→ Atalanta (loan)	1	(0)
2022	Red Star Belgrade	10	(0)
2022–2024	1. FC Magdeburg	30	(5)
2024	Sampdoria	10	(0)
2024–2025	Atlético San Luis	7	(0)
2025	Yverdon	5	(1)
Total		255	(11)

International career
2011	Italy U19	5	(1)
2011–2012	Italy U20	7	(0)
2013	Italy U21	1	(0)
2018–2019	Italy	3	(0)
- * Club domestic league appearances and goals

Cristiano Piccini (Italian pronunciation: [kriˈstjaːno pitˈtʃiːni]; born 26 September 1992) is an Italian former professional footballer who played as a defender.

== Club career ==
=== Fiorentina ===
Born in Florence, Piccini joined Fiorentina's youth setup in 2002, aged ten, after starting it out at Sporting Arno. On 5 December 2010, he made his first team – and Serie A – debut, coming on as a substitute for Manuel Pasqual in a 1–0 home win against Cagliari.

On 30 August 2011, Piccini was loaned to third division club Carrarese, in a season-long deal. He scored his first professional goal on 4 April of the following year, netting the first in a 3–1 home loss against Virtus Lanciano.

The following season, Piccini joined Spezia of Serie B on loan until the end of the season. After being an undisputed starter, he was loaned to the top level's Livorno, with a buyout clause.

=== Betis ===
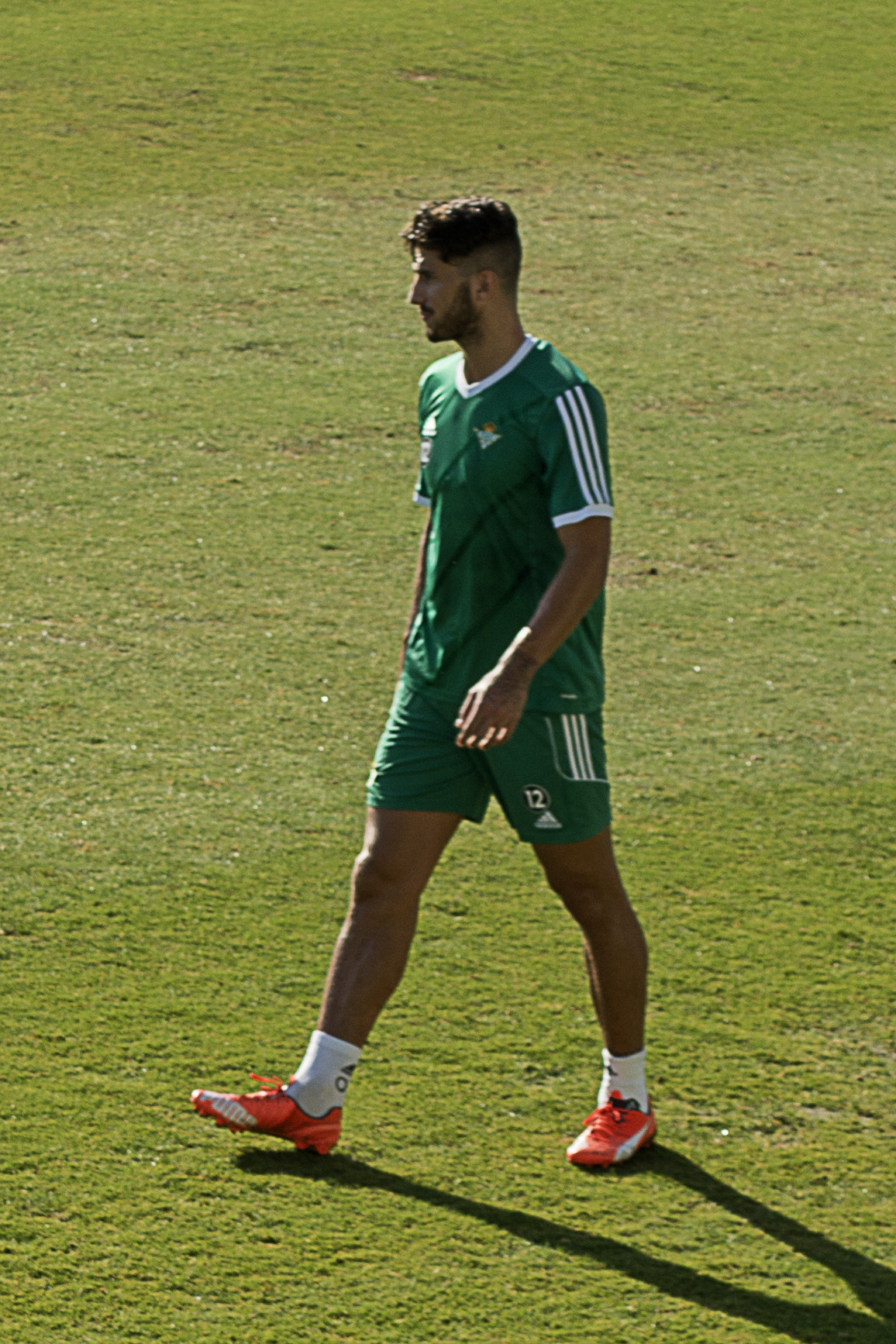
Piccini with Betis in 2015

On 27 August 2014, Piccini moved to Spanish Segunda División side Real Betis. He made his debut on 7 September, starting in a 4–1 away loss against SD Ponferradina in which he played a part in Jorge Molina's goal, and made 11 more appearances as they won the title.

Piccini signed a permanent four-year deal with the Verdiblancos on 9 July 2015, with Fiorentina holding a buyback option. He made his La Liga debut on 23 August, starting in a 1–1 home draw against Villarreal CF.

On 8 January 2017, Piccini scored his first top-flight goal to conclude a 2–0 win over CD Leganés at the Estadio Benito Villamarín, and followed it two months later to open a 1–1 draw at Deportivo de La Coruña. He was also sent off twice over the course of the season, the first coming after 16 minutes of a 3–1 loss at SD Eibar for a foul on Takashi Inui.

=== Sporting CP ===
On 18 May 2017, Piccini signed a five-year contract with Sporting CP. He made his debut for the club on 6 August, as the Primeira Liga season began with a 2–0 away win against C.D. Aves.

Piccini played four games as Sporting won the Taça da Liga. This included the final on 27 January 2018, in which he played all 120 minutes of a 1–1 draw before defeating Vitória F.C. on penalties. On 31 March, he was sent off in a 1–0 loss away to S.C. Braga.

=== Valencia ===
On 23 July 2018, Piccini returned to La Liga, signing for Valencia for a fee of around €10 million. In his debut season, he made 37 appearances, mostly as a starter, and scored a last-minute winner in a 2–1 home win over SD Huesca on 23 December. Seven of these games were in the victorious Copa del Rey run, including 18 minutes as a substitute for Kévin Gameiro in the 2–1 final win over FC Barcelona on 25 May 2019; the result was Valencia's first honour since 2008.

In August 2019, just two games into the new season, Piccini suffered a fractured kneecap while in training, an injury that would leave him out of the squad until the end of year. He remained sidelined for the whole season, undergoing another operation in May 2020.

==== Loan to Atalanta ====
On 9 September 2020, Piccini joined Italian Serie A club Atalanta on loan with an option to buy. The recovery from his kneecap injury delayed his debut until 21 November, when he played in a 0–0 away draw to Spezia. This turned out to be his only appearance for the Bergamo side, as Valencia reached an agreement for his early return in January 2021.

=== Red Star Belgrade ===
On 15 January 2022, Piccini was released from Valencia and signed a two-and-a-half-year contract with Serbian club Crvena Zvezda.

=== 1. FC Magdeburg ===
In September 2022 Piccini joined German club 1. FC Magdeburg of the 2. Bundesliga as a free agent. On 29 January 2024, Piccini's contract with Magdeburg was terminated by mutual consent.

=== Sampdoria ===
In January 2024 31, Piccini joined Italian club Sampdoria UC of the Serie B as a free agent, with a six-month contract, so he left the team on June 30.

=== Atlético San Luis ===
In July 2024 Piccini joined Mexican club Atlético San Luis of the Liga MX as a free agent. On February 7, 2025, he left the team by mutual agreement after he considered that he did not have the performance required by the team.

=== Yverdon ===
On 18 February 2025, Piccini signed with Yverdon in Switzerland until the end of the season.

== International career ==
Piccini was given his first senior call-up for Italy in October 2018 by manager Roberto Mancini, following injuries to several players in the team. He made his senior debut for the national team on 10 October, coming on as an 84th-minute substitute for Alessandro Florenzi in a 1–1 friendly draw against Ukraine in Genoa.

== Career statistics ==
=== Club ===
As of match played 17 January 2025

Appearances and goals by club, season and competition
Club	Season	League			National Cup		League Cup		Other		Total	
Club	Season	Division	Apps	Goals	Apps	Goals	Apps	Goals	Apps	Goals	Apps	Goals
Fiorentina	2010–11	Serie A	1	0	0	0	—		—		1	0
Carrarese (loan)	2011–12	Lega Pro Prima Divisione	32	1	0	0	—		—		32	1
Spezia (loan)	2012–13	Serie B	30	0	0	0	—		—		30	0
Livorno (loan)	2013–14	Serie A	20	0	1	0	—		—		21	0
Real Betis (loan)	2014–15	Segunda División	12	0	3	0	—		—		15	0
Real Betis	2015–16	La Liga	16	0	2	0	—		—		18	0
Real Betis	2016–17	La Liga	23	2	2	1	—		—		25	3
Real Betis	Total		39	2	4	1	—		—		43	3
Sporting CP	2017–18	Primeira Liga	24	0	2	0	4	0	10 (Note: Appearances in the Champions League)	0	40	0
Valencia	2018–19	La Liga	23	1	7	0	—		8 (Note: Three appearances in the UEFA Champions League and five in UEFA Europa League)	0	38	1
Valencia	2019–20	La Liga	2	0	0	0	—		—		2	0
Valencia	2020–21	La Liga	3	0	0	0	—		—		3	0
Valencia	2021–22	La Liga	6	1	2	0	—		—		8	1
Valencia	Total		34	2	9	0	—		8	0	51	2
Atalanta (loan)	2020–21	Serie A	1	0	0	0	—		—		1	0
Red Star Belgrade	2021–22	Serbian SuperLiga	10	0	2	0	—		2 (Note: Appearances in the UEFA Europa League)	0	14	0
1. FC Magdeburg	2022–23	2. Bundesliga	17	4	—		—		—		17	4
1. FC Magdeburg	2023–24	2. Bundesliga	13	1	2	0	—		—		15	1
1. FC Magdeburg	Total		30	5	2	0	—		—		32	5
Sampdoria	2023–24	Serie B	10	0	—		—		1 (Note: Appearance in promotion play-off)	0	11	0
Atlético San Luis	2024–25	Liga MX	7	0	0	0	—		—		7	0
Career total			250	10	23	1	4	0	21	0	298	11

=== International ===
As of match played 23 March 2019

Appearances and goals by national team and year
National team	Year	Apps	Goals
Italy	2018	2	0
Italy	2019	1	0
Total		3	0

== Honours ==
Betis

- Segunda División: 2014–15

Sporting CP

- Taça de Portugal runner-up: 2017–18
- Taça da Liga: 2017–18

Valencia

- Copa del Rey: 2018–19

Red Star Belgrade

- Serbian SuperLiga: 2021–22
- Serbian Cup: 2021–22
