= Charly Musonda (footballer, born 1996) =

Belgian footballer

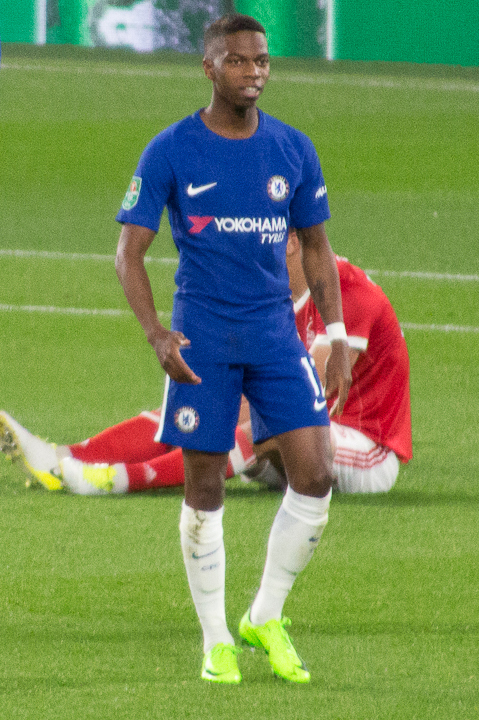
- Musonda playing for Chelsea in 2017

Personal information
- Full name: Charles Musonda
- Date of birth: 15 October 1996 (age 30)
- Place of birth: Brussels, Belgium
- Height: 1.73 m (5 ft 8 in)
- Positions: Attacking midfielder; winger

Youth career
- 2002–2012: Anderlecht
- 2012–2016: Chelsea

Senior career*
Years	Team	Apps	(Gls)
2016–2022	Chelsea	3	(0)
2016–2017	→ Betis (loan)	24	(1)
2018	→ Celtic (loan)	4	(0)
2018–2020	→ Vitesse (loan)	4	(0)
2022–2023	Levante	17	(0)
2023–2024	Anorthosis	10	(0)
Total		62	(1)

International career
2010–2011	Belgium U15	9	(0)
2011–2012	Belgium U16	9	(5)
2012–2013	Belgium U17	14	(2)
2013–2014	Belgium U19	7	(3)
2014–2016	Belgium U21	12	(1)
- * Club domestic league appearances and goals

Charles Musonda (born 15 October 1996) is a Belgian former professional footballer. Mainly an attacking midfielder, he also played as a winger.

A former youth international for Belgium, Musonda played professional football for clubs in England, Spain, Scotland, the Netherlands and Cyprus.

== Early life ==
Born in Brussels to Zambian parents, Musonda started his career at Anderlecht's youth setup. In 2011, aged only 15, he was already linked to the likes of Barcelona, Real Madrid, Manchester United, Manchester City and Chelsea.

== Club career ==
=== Chelsea ===
On 11 June 2012, Musonda joined Chelsea, along with his two older brothers, after the club previously agreed to pay a "compensation fee" to Anderlecht. On 24 October 2013, he signed a professional contract with the club, after already being a regular with the under-18s.

On 5 March 2015, after already being a regular with the club's under-21 team, Musonda signed a contract extension until 2019. He attracted interest from French clubs Monaco and Olympique de Marseille in the summer, after impressing in both UEFA Youth League and FA Youth Cup winning campaigns, but nothing came of it.

After not making any first team appearance during the first half of the 2015–16 season, Musonda asked to leave due to lack of opportunities in December. In January 2016, he rejected a loan move from Standard Liège.

==== Loan to Betis ====
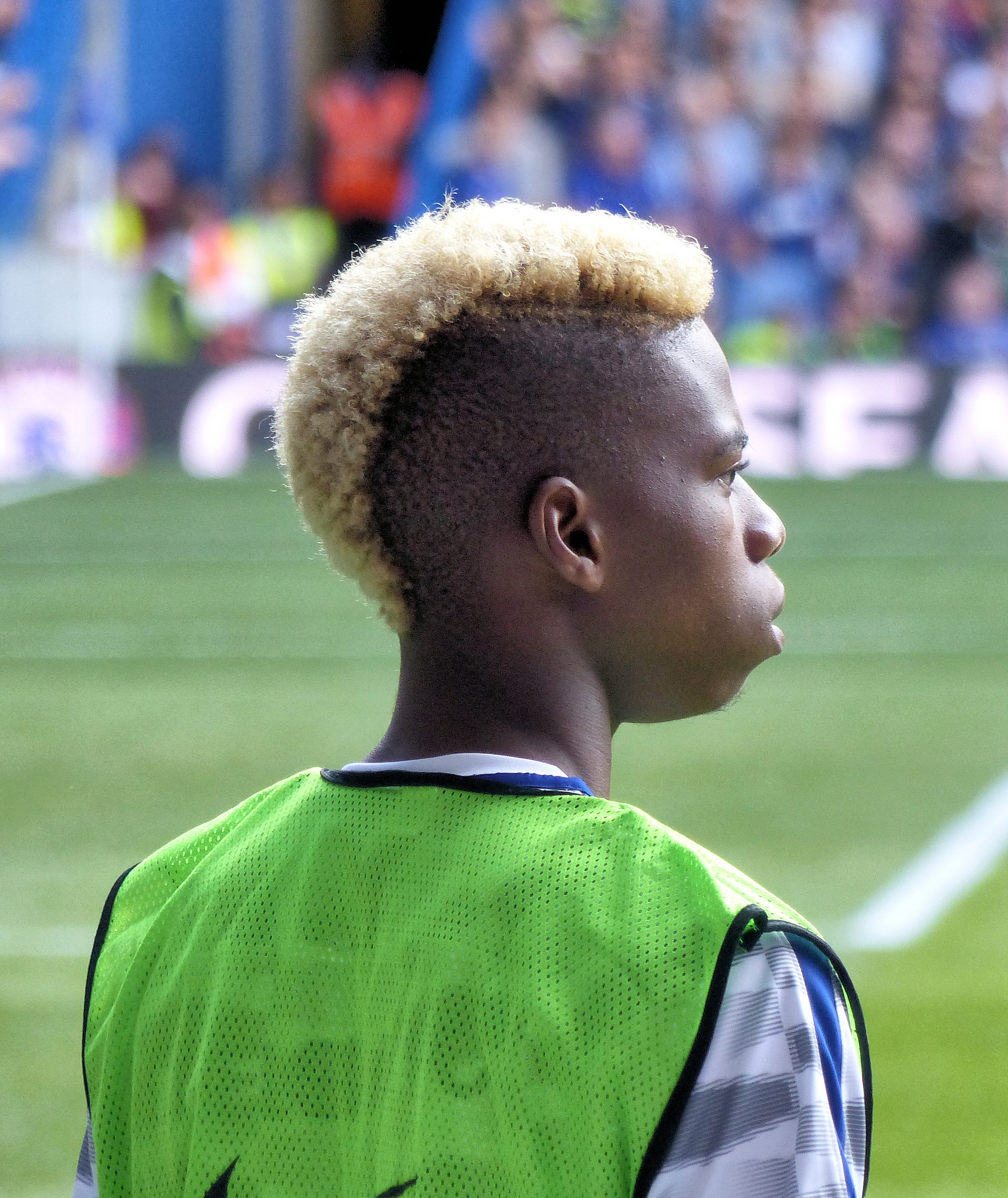
Musonda waiting to come on against Burnley at Stamford Bridge, August 2017.

On 29 January 2016, Musonda joined La Liga side Real Betis on loan until the end of the season, without the option of making the move permanent. He made his professional debut on 7 February, starting in a 1–0 home win against Valencia, where he also was awarded Man of the Match. Six days later, Musonda scored his first professional goal in a 2–2 draw at Deportivo de La Coruña. On 22 June, Musonda's loan at Real Betis was extended for the 2016–17 campaign. On 1 January 2017, after only making one start in the eight appearances Musonda made under manager Gus Poyet, the Belgian returned to Chelsea.

==== 2016–17 and 2017–18 seasons ====
On 1 January 2017, it was confirmed by Real Betis that Chelsea had recalled the Belgian. With manager Antonio Conte unsure whether Musonda was to stay with the Blues or be loaned out, interest arose from many clubs around Europe, including Roma. However, after the conclusion of the January transfer window, Antonio Conte confirmed in a post-match press conference preceding Chelsea's 1–1 away draw with Liverpool, that Nathan Aké, Kenedy and Musonda would be staying at the club for the rest of the 2016–17 campaign. Musonda made his debut for Chelsea on 6 August 2017 in the 2017 FA Community Shield against Arsenal, coming on as a substitute after 84 minutes. He made his first starting appearance for the club in an EFL Cup tie against Nottingham Forest, scoring the third goal in a 5–1 victory on 20 September 2017.

==== Loan to Celtic ====
On 29 January 2018, Musonda joined Celtic on an 18-month loan deal. He made his debut the following day in a 3–1 victory over Heart of Midlothian at Celtic Park. In February, he provided the assist for Callum McGregor's goal in a 1–0 win over Zenit St Petersburg in the first leg of the round of 32 stage of the Europa League. The loan agreement was terminated in May 2018, as Musonda had not received sufficient playing time at Celtic.

==== Loan to Vitesse ====
Musonda then departed Chelsea once again, joining Eredivisie side Vitesse on a season-long loan from 31 August 2018 (transfer deadline day), having missed out on Chelsea's 23-man squad ahead of the Premier League season. Musonda then agreed to remain there on loan for a second season during the following July. One week into his initial loan period, Musonda suffered a posterior cruciate ligament injury, which restricted him to just four league appearances over the next two seasons.

==== Recovery from injury and final stages in London ====
Shortly after he went through surgery in August 2019, a pool of doctors who examined Musonda's injury rated his chances of playing again at just 20%. However, the Belgian still decided to go through recovery and work on regaining his fitness and condition, eventually returning to team training between December 2020 and January 2021.

Musonda was subsequently aggregated to the Blues' Under-23 squad: on 24 September 2021, he started and played for 61 minutes in the Premier League 2 match against Liverpool, which ended in 4–3 win for his side. The occasion marked his first official match in over two years. He also featured in the following league match against Blackburn, where he played the whole game and his side lost 1–0.

In November 2021, while still training in London, Musonda announced that he wouldn't renew his contract with Chelsea, which was set to expire in June 2022. On 10 June 2022, Chelsea announced he was leaving the club.

=== Levante ===
On 16 August 2022, Musonda signed a two-year deal with Segunda División club Levante. On 25 September 2022, Musonda played his first professional game in over 1000 days against Burgos after a period of long injury.

On 1 September 2023, Musonda terminated his contract with the club.

=== Anorthosis ===
On 30 September 2023, Musonda signed a three-year contract with Cypriot First Division club Anorthosis Famagusta. However, he left the club after only one year.

On 30 June 2025, Musonda announced his retirement from professional football at the age of 28, after suffering from recurring injuries.

== International career ==
Musonda is a Belgian international from under-15 to under-21 levels.

== Personal life ==
Charly attended Richard Challoner School in New Malden. Musonda's older brothers, Lamisha and Tika were also youth graduates at Chelsea and Anderlecht. His father, also named Charles, was also a footballer who appeared mainly for Anderlecht, and was an international regular for Zambia.

== Career statistics ==
Appearances and goals by club, season and competition
Club	Season	League			National cup (Note: Includes FA Cup, Scottish Cup, Copa del Rey)		League cup (Note: Includes EFL Cup)		Europe		Other		Total	
Club	Season	Division	Apps	Goals	Apps	Goals	Apps	Goals	Apps	Goals	Apps	Goals	Apps	Goals
Chelsea	2015–16	Premier League	0	0	0	0	0	0	0	0	—		0	0
Chelsea	2016–17	Premier League	0	0	0	0	0	0	0	0	—		0	0
Chelsea	2017–18	Premier League	3	0	1	0	2	1	0	0	1 (Note: Appearance in FA Community Shield)	0	7	1
Chelsea	2018–19	Premier League	0	0	0	0	0	0	0	0	—		0	0
Chelsea	2019–20	Premier League	0	0	0	0	0	0	0	0	—		0	0
Chelsea	2020–21	Premier League	0	0	0	0	0	0	0	0	—		0	0
Chelsea	2021–22	Premier League	0	0	0	0	0	0	0	0	—		0	0
Chelsea	Total		3	0	1	0	2	1	0	0	1	0	7	1
Real Betis (loan)	2015–16	La Liga	16	1	0	0	—		—		—		16	1
Real Betis (loan)	2016–17	La Liga	8	0	0	0	—		—		—		8	0
Real Betis (loan)	Total		24	1	0	0	—		—		—		24	1
Celtic (loan)	2017–18	Scottish Premiership	4	0	2	0	—		2 (Note: Appearance(s) in UEFA Europa League)	0	—		8	0
Vitesse (loan)	2018–19	Eredivisie	1	0	0	0	—		—		—		1	0
Vitesse (loan)	2019–20	Eredivisie	3	0	0	0	—		—		—		3	0
Vitesse (loan)	Total		4	0	0	0	—		—		—		4	0
Levante	2022–23	Segunda División	17	0	2	0	—		—		1 (Note: Appearance in 2023 Segunda División play-offs)	0	20	0
Anorthosis	2023–24	Cypriot First Division	10	0	1	0	—		—		—		11	0
Career total			62	1	6	0	2	1	2	0	2	0	74	2

== Honours ==
Chelsea Reserves

- FA Youth Cup: 2013–14, 2014–15
- Professional U21 Development League: 2013-14
- UEFA Youth League: 2014–15
