= Pedro López (footballer, born 1995) =

Spanish footballer

Personal information
- Full name: Pedro López Galisteo
- Date of birth: 21 January 1995 (age 31)
- Place of birth: Mérida, Spain
- Height: 1.87 m (6 ft 1 1/2 in)
- Position: Goalkeeper

Team information
- Current team: Ceuta
- Number: 1

Youth career
- 2000–2010: Mérida
- 2010–2014: Betis

Senior career*
Years	Team	Apps	(Gls)
2012–2018	Betis B	85	(0)
2014–2018	Betis	6	(0)
2016–2017	→ Sanluqueño (loan)	9	(0)
2018–2019	Deportivo B	13	(0)
2019–2020	Burgos	11	(0)
2020–2021	Villanovense	24	(0)
2021–2022	Extremadura	5	(0)
2022	UCAM Murcia	11	(0)
2022–2023	S.S. Reyes	37	(0)
2023–	Ceuta	66	(0)
- * Club domestic league appearances and goals as of 9 June 2026

Pedro López Galisteo (born 21 January 1995) is a Spanish professional footballer who plays as a goalkeeper for Segunda División club Ceuta.

== Club career ==
Born in Mérida, Extremadura, López joined Real Betis' youth system in 2010 at the age of 15, having begun at his local club Mérida UD. In October 2012, while still a junior, he was called up to train with the first team by coach Pepe Mel.

López returned to the youth squad, but made his senior debut with the reserves on 9 December 2012, starting the 4–0 away loss against Sevilla Atlético. After splitting the 2013–14 season between the B side and the academy, he first appeared in La Liga with the main squad on 11 May 2014, coming on as an 84th-minute substitute for the injured Antonio Adán in a 4–3 home win over Real Valladolid as the Andalusians were already relegated as dead last.

On 26 August 2016, López was loaned to Atlético Sanluqueño CF of Segunda División B. The following 6 July, he returned to Betis B who now competed in the third tier, and renewed his link for a further year.

On 22 April 2018, with starter Adán sidelined due to physical problems, López replaced injured Dani Giménez late into the first half of the league fixture away to Atlético Madrid, and kept a clean sheet in a 0–0 draw. On 3 July, he terminated his contract.

López moved to another reserve team on 30 August 2018, agreeing to a one-year deal with Deportivo Fabril of the third division. After their relegation, he signed a three-year deal with Burgos CF in the same league.

López continue to play in the third tier subsequently, with CF Villanovense, Extremadura UD, UCAM Murcia CF, UD San Sebastián de los Reyes and AD Ceuta FC. The competition was renamed Primera Federación from Primera División RFEF in the 2022–23 campaign.

== Honours ==
Ceuta

- Primera Federación: 2024–25
