= Francisco Portillo (footballer, born 1990) =

Spanish footballer

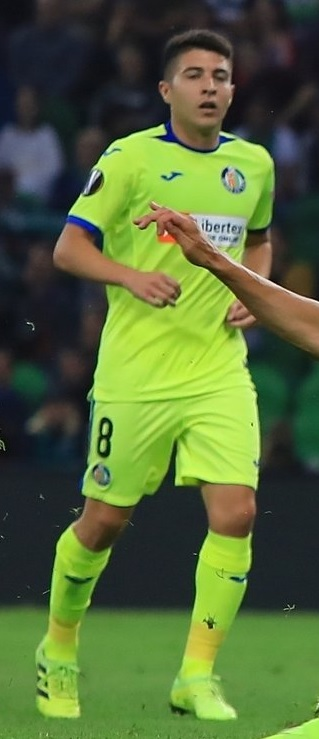
- Portillo with Getafe in 2019

Personal information
- Full name: Francisco Portillo Soler
- Date of birth: 13 June 1990 (age 36)
- Place of birth: Málaga, Spain
- Height: 1.69 m (5 ft 7 in)
- Position: Attacking midfielder

Youth career
- El Palo
- 2006–2008: Málaga

Senior career*
Years	Team	Apps	(Gls)
2008–2011	Málaga B	80	(5)
2010–2015	Málaga	72	(5)
2015	→ Betis (loan)	21	(0)
2015–2017	Betis	19	(0)
2016–2017	→ Getafe (loan)	33	(4)
2017–2021	Getafe	97	(3)
2021–2023	Almería	66	(5)
2023–2024	Leganés	34	(1)
2024–2025	Oviedo	22	(1)
2025–2026	Huesca	39	(1)
- * Club domestic league appearances and goals as of 9 June 2026

Francisco Portillo Soler (born 13 June 1990) is a Spanish professional footballer who plays as an attacking midfielder.

== Club career ==
Born in Málaga, Andalusia, Portillo emerged through local club Málaga CF's youth ranks. He first appeared with the first team in the 2009 pre-season, being considered player of the match in the 1–0 win against Aston Villa in the Peace Cup on 25 July.

Portillo made his La Liga debut on 24 January 2010, replacing the injured Patrick Mtiliga in the 74th minute of a 2–0 loss at Real Madrid. On 10 August, he agreed to an extension running until June 2013.

After the 2011 summer signing of Joaquín, Portillo was further demoted down in Málaga's pecking order, not making the 18-men squad in most of the matches. His first league appearance of the season only came on 9 April 2012, as he played the last eight minutes in a 3−0 home victory over Racing de Santander.

On 15 September 2012, Portillo scored his first goal as a professional, with a beautiful volley in a 3−1 home defeat of Levante UD. He appeared in 38 competitive games during the campaign, including eight in the side's first-ever participation in the UEFA Champions League.

On 15 January 2015, Portillo was loaned to Segunda División's Real Betis until June, with an obligatory buyout clause if the team was promoted. Having contributed 21 appearances in the season, he signed a permanent three-year deal.

Portillo was loaned to Getafe CF of the second tier on 31 August 2016, for one year. After achieving promotion, he was bought outright on 3 July 2017.

On 22 July 2021, free agent Portillo signed a two-year contract with UD Almería in the second division. Regularly used during his spell (and achieving promotion in his first season), he left on 14 June 2023 as his link was about to expire.

On 20 September 2023, Portillo joined second-tier CD Leganés on a one-year deal. He earned another promotion at the end of the campaign, becoming the first player to achieve this with four clubs in the process; Antonio Fernández had already done the same in the 60s/70s, but only in service of CD Málaga.

Portillo moved to Real Oviedo in November 2024 after severing his ties to Leganés, on a short-term contract. On 21 June 2025, he closed the 3–1 extra-time win over CD Mirandés in the second leg of the play-off final, sealing the former's return to the main division after 24 years.

On 29 August 2025, the free agent Portillo agreed to a one-year deal at SD Huesca.

== Career statistics ==
As of match played 21 June 2025

Appearances and goals by club, season and competition
Club	Season	League			Cup		Continental		Other		Total	
Club	Season	Division	Apps	Goals	Apps	Goals	Apps	Goals	Apps	Goals	Apps	Goals
Málaga	2009–10	La Liga	1	0	0	0	—		—		1	0
Málaga	2010–11	La Liga	17	0	3	0	—		—		20	0
Málaga	2011–12	La Liga	2	0	1	0	—		—		3	0
Málaga	2012–13	La Liga	27	2	3	1	8 (Note: Appearances in UEFA Champions League)	0	—		38	3
Málaga	2013–14	La Liga	25	3	2	0	—		—		27	3
Málaga	2014–15	La Liga	0	0	2	0	—		—		2	0
Málaga	Total		72	5	11	1	8	0	—		91	6
Betis (loan)	2014–15	Segunda División	21	0	0	0	—		—		21	0
Betis	2015–16	La Liga	19	0	4	0	—		—		23	0
Betis	Total		40	0	4	0	—		—		44	0
Getafe (loan)	2016–17	Segunda División	33	4	1	0	—		4 (Note: Appearances in La Liga play-offs)	0	38	4
Getafe	2017–18	La Liga	33	2	2	0	—		—		35	2
Getafe	2018–19	La Liga	32	1	5	1	—		—		37	2
Getafe	2019–20	La Liga	16	0	1	0	6 (Note: Appearances in UEFA Europa League)	0	—		23	0
Getafe	2020–21	La Liga	16	0	2	0	—		—		18	0
Getafe	Total		130	7	11	1	6	0	4	0	151	8
Almería	2021–22	Segunda División	39	3	1	0	—		—		40	3
Almería	2022–23	La Liga	27	2	1	0	—		—		28	2
Almería	Total		66	5	2	0	—		—		68	5
Leganés	2023–24	Segunda División	34	1	0	0	—		0	0	34	1
Oviedo	2024–25	Segunda División	22	1	0	0	—		2	1	24	2
Career total			364	19	28	2	14	0	6	1	412	22

== Honours ==
Betis

- Segunda División: 2014–15

Almería

- Segunda División: 2021–22

Leganés

- Segunda División: 2023–24
