= Antonio Adán =

Spanish footballer (born 1987)

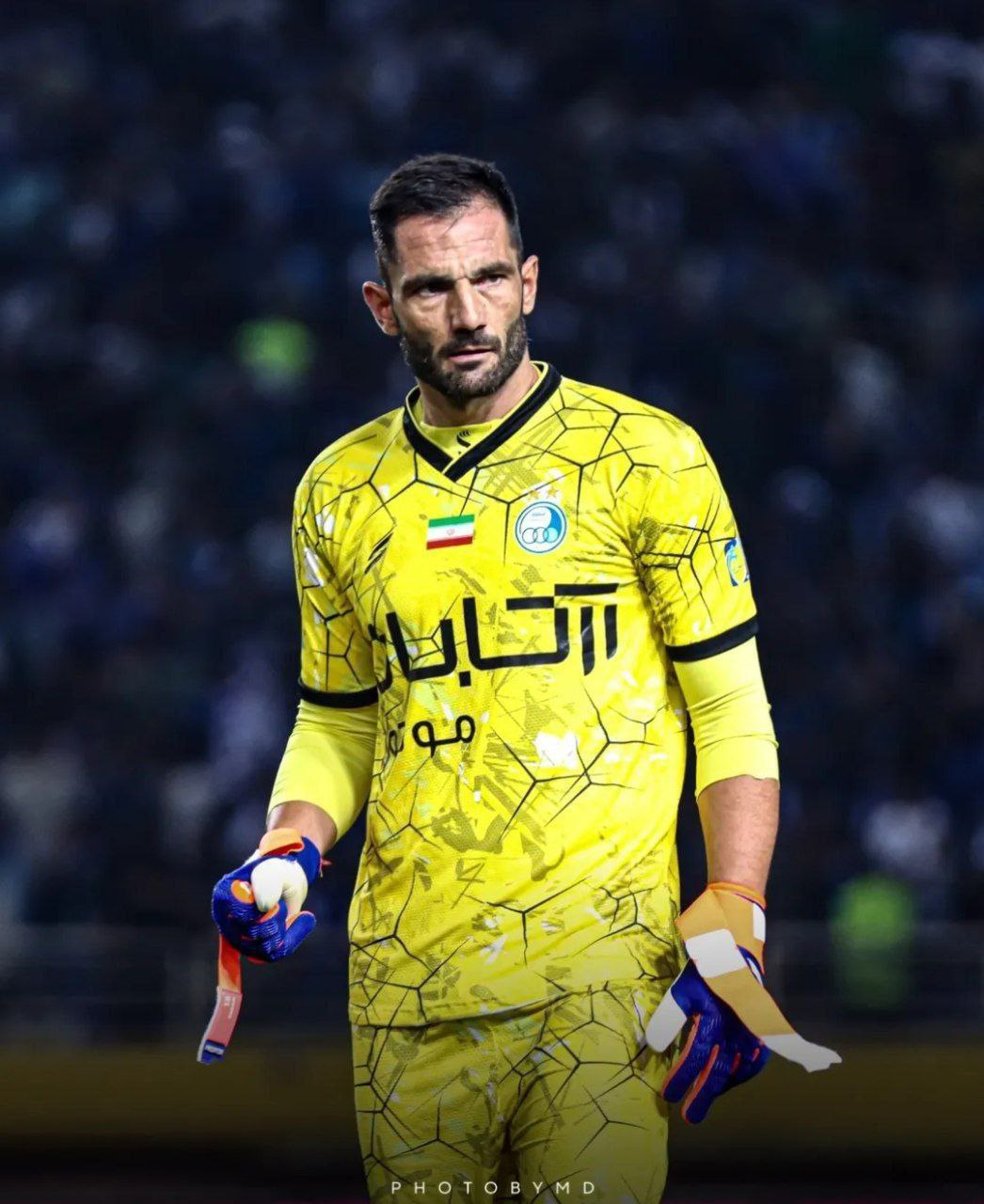
- Adan with Esteghlal in 2025

Personal information
- Full name: Antonio Adán Garrido
- Date of birth: 13 May 1987 (age 39)
- Place of birth: Madrid, Spain
- Height: 1.90 m (6 ft 3 in)
- Position: Goalkeeper

Youth career
- 1997–2004: Real Madrid

Senior career*
Years	Team	Apps	(Gls)
2004–2006	Real Madrid C	51	(0)
2006–2010	Real Madrid B	84	(0)
2010–2013	Real Madrid	7	(0)
2013–2014	Cagliari	2	(0)
2014–2018	Betis	160	(0)
2018–2020	Atlético Madrid	2	(0)
2020–2024	Sporting CP	118	(0)
2025–2026	Esteghlal	20	(0)
Total		444	(0)

International career
2002	Spain U16	5	(0)
2002–2005	Spain U17	19	(0)
2006	Spain U19	8	(0)
2007	Spain U20	6	(0)
2007	Spain U21	1	(0)
Medal record
Men's football
Representing Spain
UEFA European Under-19 Championship
Winner	2006 Poland
FIFA U-17 World Cup
Runner-up	2003 Finland
UEFA European Under-17 Championship
Runner-up	2003 Portugal
Runner-up	2004 France
- * Club domestic league appearances and goals

Antonio Adán Garrido (Spanish pronunciation: [anˈtonjo aˈðan]; born 13 May 1987) is a Spanish former professional footballer who played as a goalkeeper.

A youth product of Real Madrid, where he acted mainly as a backup, he spent most of his career with Betis. He totalled 129 La Liga matches for those two clubs, as well as Atlético Madrid for whom he signed in 2018. Abroad, he featured for Cagliari in Serie A, and won two Primeira Liga titles with Sporting CP.

All youth levels comprised, Adán won 39 caps for Spain.

== Club career ==
=== Real Madrid ===
A Real Madrid youth graduate, Madrid-born Adán was the first-choice goalkeeper for its C side in the 2005–06 season, playing 36 games and conceding 29 goals. He also started three times for the Juvenil team which won the Champions Cup of the category, keeping a clean sheet in the tournament.

The following campaign, Adán was selected for the first team's United States tour in August 2006. He served as backup to captain Jordi Codina in Real Madrid Castilla, until the latter's promotion to the main squad.

Adán made his debut in 2006–07's Segunda División on 27 August 2006, in a 1–1 away draw with Castellón. He appeared in six league matches as Real's reserves were eventually relegated.

After the sale of Codina to neighbours Getafe, Adán was promoted to the senior squad for pre-season training in the 2009–10 campaign. While still featuring mostly for the B's, he was third choice in the first team behind Iker Casillas and Jerzy Dudek.

On 8 December 2010, Adán played his first competitive game for Real Madrid, coming on as a substitute for the injured Dudek in the 44th minute of the 4–0 home win against Auxerre in the group stage of the UEFA Champions League; the Merengues had already won their group, and manager José Mourinho rested several starters. The following month, he featured the full 90 minutes in a 2–0 loss at Levante in the round of 16 of the Copa del Rey (8–2 on aggregate).

Adán made his La Liga debut on 13 February 2011, replacing sent off Casillas in the second minute of a 1–0 away victory over Espanyol. Starting in the following matchday, at home against Levante, he kept a clean sheet in a 2–0 win.

On 22 December 2012, Adán relegated longtime incumbent Casillas to the bench in a 3–2 away loss to Málaga; Mourinho defended his controversial decision in his post-match comments by saying: "It's a technical decision. The coach analyses the situation, looks at the players at his disposal and chooses his team. At the moment, for me and my coaching staff, Adán is better than Iker". He retained his place for the next game, being sent off in the early minutes of an eventual 4–3 home defeat of Real Sociedad after giving away a penalty.

=== Cagliari ===
On 2 September 2013, Adán left Real Madrid after his contract was terminated. On 19 November he signed with Italy's Cagliari, making his Serie A debut on 5 January of the following year in a 0–0 away draw against ChievoVerona.

=== Betis ===
On 27 January 2014, Adán terminated his link to the Sardinians and returned to his country and its top division, joining struggling Real Betis. He contributed 40 appearances in his first full season, helping his team win the second-tier championship and subsequently promote.

Adán was named team captain in August 2014, alongside Jorge Molina, Damien Perquis and Xavi Torres. Over the following two top-flight campaigns, he only missed three matches.

=== Atlético Madrid ===
Adán returned to the Spanish capital on 10 July 2018, with the 31-year-old signing a two-year contract with Atlético Madrid. Used only in domestic cup games, he did not debut in the league until the last game of the season when he stood in for the injured Jan Oblak for a 2–2 draw at Levante on 18 May 2019.

=== Sporting CP ===
On 20 August 2020, Adán moved to Portuguese club Sporting CP on a free transfer, for two years with the option of a third. He was a key player as they won their first Primeira Liga title in 19 years, keeping 20 clean sheets and conceding just 19 goals in 32 matches. In November 2021, his contract was extended to 2024.

Adán claimed another league title at the end of the 2023–24 campaign. He was sidelined in the final two months after suffering an injury in training, but still contributed 22 appearances to the feat before being replaced by Uruguayan Franco Israel.

=== Esteghlal ===
On 6 August 2025, after one year of inactivity, the 38-year-old Adán joined Esteghlal in the Persian Gulf Pro League; he became the club's first foreign goalkeeper in 20 years. He made his debut five days later in the Iranian Super Cup, a 2–1 defeat against Tractor, and his league bow was on 19 August in the 1–0 win over the same opponents.

== International career ==
In July 2006, Adán captained the Spain under-19 team all the way to winning the UEFA European Championship alongside four other Real Madrid products: Alberto Bueno, Javi García, Esteban Granero and Juan Mata.

He was subsequently called up to the under-21 squad for the 2007 European Championship play-off against Italy in October 2006, but was benched – Spain lost 2–1 on aggregate. He made his only appearance at that level on 6 February 2007, in a 2–2 friendly draw with England held at Pride Park Stadium.

== Career statistics ==
Appearances and goals by club, season and competition
Club	Season	League			National cup (Note: Includes Copa del Rey, Taça de Portugal)		League cup (Note: Includes Taça da Liga)		Europe		Other		Total	
Club	Season	Division	Apps	Goals	Apps	Goals	Apps	Goals	Apps	Goals	Apps	Goals	Apps	Goals
Real Madrid B	2006–07	Segunda División	6	0	—		—		—		—		6	0
Real Madrid B	2007–08	Segunda División B	11	0	—		—		—		—		11	0
Real Madrid B	2008–09	Segunda División B	31	0	—		—		—		—		31	0
Real Madrid B	2009–10	Segunda División B	36	0	—		—		—		—		36	0
Real Madrid B	Total		84	0	—		—		—		—		84	0
Real Madrid	2009–10	La Liga	0	0	0	0	—		0	0	—		0	0
Real Madrid	2010–11	La Liga	3	0	1	0	—		1 (Note: Appearances in UEFA Champions League)	0	—		5	0
Real Madrid	2011–12	La Liga	1	0	2	0	—		2	0	0	0	5	0
Real Madrid	2012–13	La Liga	3	0	4	0	—		1	0	0	0	8	0
Real Madrid	Total		7	0	7	0	—		4	0	0	0	18	0
Cagliari	2013–14	Serie A	2	0	0	0	—		—		—		2	0
Betis	2013–14	La Liga	17	0	0	0	—		4 (Note: Appearances in UEFA Europa League)	0	—		21	0
Betis	2014–15	Segunda División	40	0	0	0	—		—		—		40	0
Betis	2015–16	La Liga	36	0	1	0	—		—		—		37	0
Betis	2016–17	La Liga	37	0	0	0	—		—		—		37	0
Betis	2017–18	La Liga	30	0	0	0	—		—		—		30	0
Betis	Total		160	0	1	0	—		4	0	—		165	0
Atlético Madrid	2018–19	La Liga	1	0	4	0	—		0	0	0	0	5	0
Atlético Madrid	2019–20	La Liga	1	0	1	0	—		0	0	0	0	2	0
Atlético Madrid	Total		2	0	5	0	—		0	0	0	0	7	0
Sporting CP	2020–21	Primeira Liga	32	0	1	0	2	0	2	0	—		37	0
Sporting CP	2021–22	Primeira Liga	33	0	2	0	2	0	7	0	1 (Note: Appearance in Supertaça Cândido de Oliveira)	0	45	0
Sporting CP	2022–23	Primeira Liga	31	0	0	0	4	0	11 (Note: Five appearances in UEFA Champions League, six appearances in UEFA Europa League)	0	—		46	0
Sporting CP	2023–24	Primeira Liga	22	0	0	0	0	0	6	0	—		28	0
Sporting CP	Total		118	0	3	0	8	0	26	0	1	0	156	0
Esteghlal	2025–26	Persian Gulf Pro League	13	0	1	0	—		4 (Note: AFC Champions League Two)	0	1 (Note: Appearance in Iranian Super Cup)	0	19	0
Career total			386	0	17	0	8	0	38	0	2	0	451	0

== Honours ==
Real Madrid

- La Liga: 2011–12
- Copa del Rey: 2010–11; runner-up: 2012–13
- Supercopa de España: 2012; runner-up: 2011

Betis

- Segunda División: 2014–15

Atlético Madrid

- UEFA Super Cup: 2018

Sporting CP

- Primeira Liga: 2020–21, 2023–24
- Taça da Liga: 2020–21, 2021–22
- Supertaça Cândido de Oliveira: 2021

Spain U19

- UEFA European Under-19 Championship: 2006

Individual

- Primeira Liga Team of the Year: 2020–21
