= Dani Giménez =

Spanish footballer (born 1983)

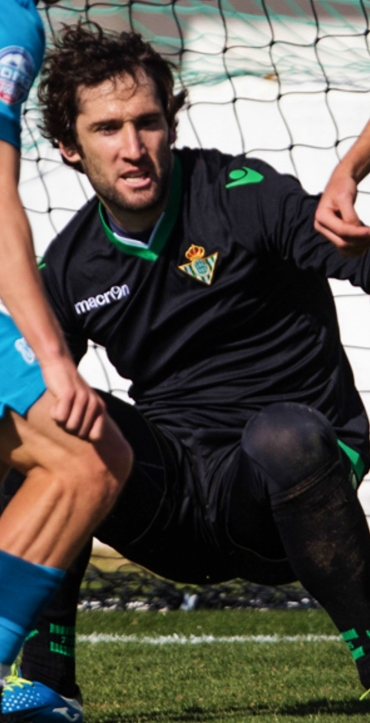
- Giménez playing with Betis in 2015

Personal information
- Full name: Daniel Giménez Hernández
- Date of birth: 30 July 1983 (age 43)
- Place of birth: Vigo, Spain
- Height: 1.85 m (6 ft 1 in)
- Position: Goalkeeper

Team information
- Current team: Sarriana (manager)

Youth career
- Celta

Senior career*
Years	Team	Apps	(Gls)
2001–2004	Celta B	9	(0)
2004–2009	Zamora	132	(0)
2009–2013	Rayo Vallecano	37	(0)
2013–2014	Alcorcón	42	(0)
2014–2018	Betis	10	(0)
2018–2020	Deportivo La Coruña	82	(0)
2020–2021	Logroñés	8	(0)
Total		320	(0)

Managerial career
- 2024–2025: Manchego Ciudad Real
- 2025–: Sarriana
- * Club domestic league appearances and goals

Daniel "Dani" Giménez Hernández (born 30 July 1983) is a Spanish former professional footballer who played as a goalkeeper. He is currently manager of Segunda Federación club Sarriana.

== Playing career ==
Born in Vigo, Galicia, Giménez spent his first eight seasons as a senior in the Segunda División B, with Celta de Vigo B and Zamora CF. With the latter, he faced Rayo Vallecano in 2007–08's playoffs, impressing well enough to sign for the club the following year after it had earned a Segunda División promotion.

In his first two seasons with Rayo, Giménez acted as understudy for David Cobeño, starting in the Copa del Rey. In his second, he appeared in seven games to help the team return to La Liga after an eight-year absence.

Giménez made his top-division debut on 28 August 2011, in a 1–1 away draw against Athletic Bilbao. He battled for first-choice status with Cobeño during the campaign.

On 19 July 2013, Giménez signed a one-year deal with AD Alcorcón of the second tier. On 4 July of the following year, he moved to Real Betis in the same league for two seasons.

On 23 May 2018, having acted as a backup for most of his spell, Giménez joined Deportivo de La Coruña, recently relegated to division two. He only missed two league matches during his tenure while also taking part in the 2019 promotion play-offs, but left in August 2020 after suffering relegation.

Giménez signed a short-term deal at UD Logroñés also in the second division on 9 December 2020, as all three first-team goalkeepers (Rubén Miño, Roberto Santamaría and Yaroslav Meykher) were sidelined with injuries.

== Coaching career ==
Giménez started working as a head coach in October 2024, with Tercera Federación club CD Manchego Ciudad Real. On 7 November 2025, he was appointed at SD Sarriana in the Segunda Federación; shortly after his arrival at the latter, he confessed that he considered himself to be a better manager than he was a player.

== Career statistics ==
Appearances and goals by club, season and competition
Club	Season	League			Cup		Other		Total	
Club	Season	Division	Apps	Goals	Apps	Goals	Apps	Goals	Apps	Goals
Celta B	2001–02	Segunda División B	1	0	—		—		1	0
Celta B	2002–03	Segunda División B	2	0	—		—		2	0
Celta B	2003–04	Segunda División B	6	0	—		1 (Note: Appearances in Segunda División B play-offs)	0	7	0
Celta B	Total		9	0	—		1	0	10	0
Zamora	2004–05	Segunda División B	1	0	—		—		1	0
Zamora	2005–06	Segunda División B	27	0	1	0	—		28	0
Zamora	2006–07	Segunda División B	29	0	—		—		29	0
Zamora	2007–08	Segunda División B	37	0	—		4	0	41	0
Zamora	2008–09	Segunda División B	38	0	1	0	2	0	41	0
Zamora	Total		132	0	2	0	6	0	140	0
Rayo Vallecano	2009–10	Segunda División	17	0	6	0	—		23	0
Rayo Vallecano	2010–11	Segunda División	7	0	1	0	—		8	0
Rayo Vallecano	2011–12	La Liga	11	0	2	0	—		13	0
Rayo Vallecano	2012–13	La Liga	2	0	1	0	—		3	0
Rayo Vallecano	Total		37	0	10	0	—		47	0
Alcorcón	2013–14	Segunda División	42	0	5	0	—		47	0
Betis	2014–15	Segunda División	2	0	4	0	—		6	0
Betis	2015–16	La Liga	3	0	3	0	—		6	0
Betis	2016–17	La Liga	1	0	2	0	—		3	0
Betis	2017–18	La Liga	4	0	2	0	—		6	0
Betis	Total		10	0	11	0	—		21	0
Deportivo La Coruña	2018–19	Segunda División	41	0	0	0	4 (Note: Appearances in La Liga play-offs)	0	45	0
Deportivo La Coruña	2019–20	Segunda División	41	0	0	0	—		41	0
Deportivo La Coruña	Total		82	0	0	0	4	0	86	0
Logroñés	2020–21	Segunda División	8	0	1	0	—		9	0
Career total			320	0	29	0	11	0	360	0

== Honours ==
Betis

- Segunda División: 2014–15
