= Álex Martínez (footballer, born 1990) =

Spanish footballer

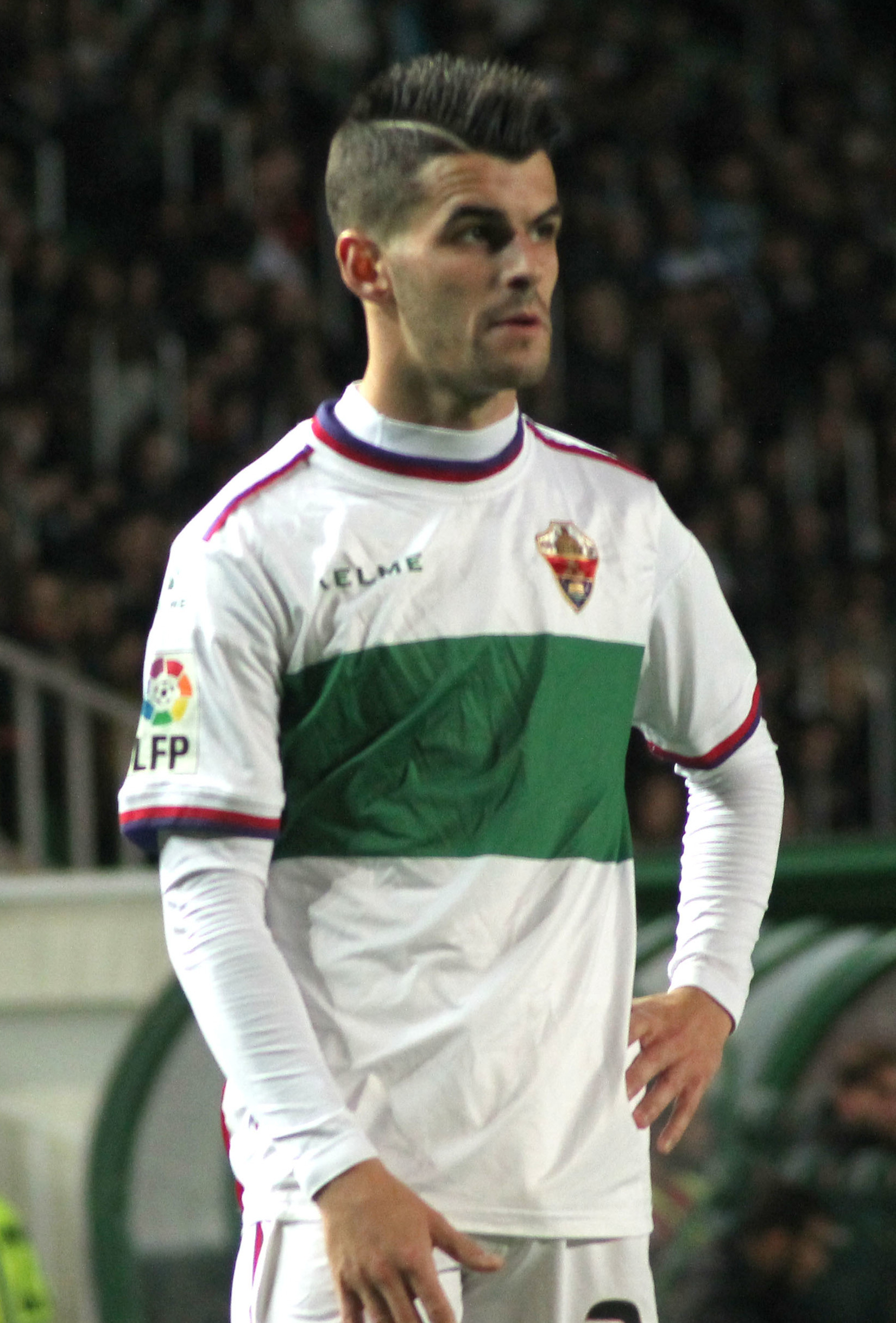
- Martínez with Elche in 2016

Personal information
- Full name: Alejandro Martínez Sánchez
- Date of birth: 12 August 1990 (age 36)
- Place of birth: Seville, Spain
- Height: 1.76 m (5 ft 9 in)
- Position: Left-back

Team information
- Current team: Central

Youth career
- Betis

Senior career*
Years	Team	Apps	(Gls)
2009–2010	Betis C	16	(0)
2009–2012	Betis B	60	(4)
2011–2017	Betis	40	(0)
2013–2014	→ Murcia (loan)	40	(3)
2015–2016	→ Elche (loan)	32	(0)
2017–2020	Granada	60	(3)
2021–2022	Hércules	44	(2)
2022–2024	Eldense	36	(3)
2024–2025	Atlético Sanluqueño	36	(1)
2025–2026	Marbella	37	(2)
2025–	Central	4	(1)
- * Club domestic league appearances and goals as of 18:57, 30 September 2026 (UTC)

Alejandro "Álex" Martínez Sánchez (born 12 August 1990) is a Spanish professional footballer who plays as a left-back for Segunda Federación club Central.

== Club career ==
=== Betis ===
Born in Seville, Andalusia, Martínez graduated from Real Betis' academy, and made his debut as a senior with the C team in 2010. After appearing regularly for the reserves in the Segunda División B, he made his first-team debut on 11 May 2011, starting in a 3–1 home win against CD Tenerife in the Segunda División.

On 27 August 2011, while still registered with the B side, Martínez made his La Liga debut, coming on as a late substitute for Jefferson Montero in the 1–0 away victory over Granada CF. After appearing rarely during the campaign (three appearances, 117 minutes of action), he was definitely promoted to the main squad in the summer of 2012.

On 16 August 2013, Martínez renewed his contract until 2017, and was immediately loaned to second-tier club Real Murcia CF. He scored his first professional goal on 12 October, the game's only in a home defeat of Girona FC.

Martínez suffered a severe knee injury on 10 November 2014, which kept him sidelined for seven months. He only returned to the fields on 7 June of the following year, replacing Francisco Portillo in a 0–3 home loss to Sporting de Gijón.

On 18 August 2015, Martínez was loaned to Elche CF in a season-long deal. Upon returning to the Estadio Benito Villamarín, he acted mainly as a backup to new signing Riza Durmisi.

=== Granada ===
On 26 June 2017, the free agent Martínez signed a two-year contract with Granada CF, recently relegated from the top flight. A starter in his first season, he dealt with several injury problems and eventually lost his starting spot to Quini in his second, which ended in promotion.

Martínez was further down the pecking order in 2019–20, after Carlos Neva was promoted to the first team. On 29 September 2020, after just one appearance during the whole campaign, he terminated his contract.

=== Later career ===
On 2 February 2021, Martínez joined Hércules CF of the third tier. With the exception of the 2023–24 season in the second division with CD Eldense, where he featured rarely due to a knee ailment, he spent the remainder of his career in the lower leagues.
