= Álvaro Cejudo =

Spanish footballer (born 1984)

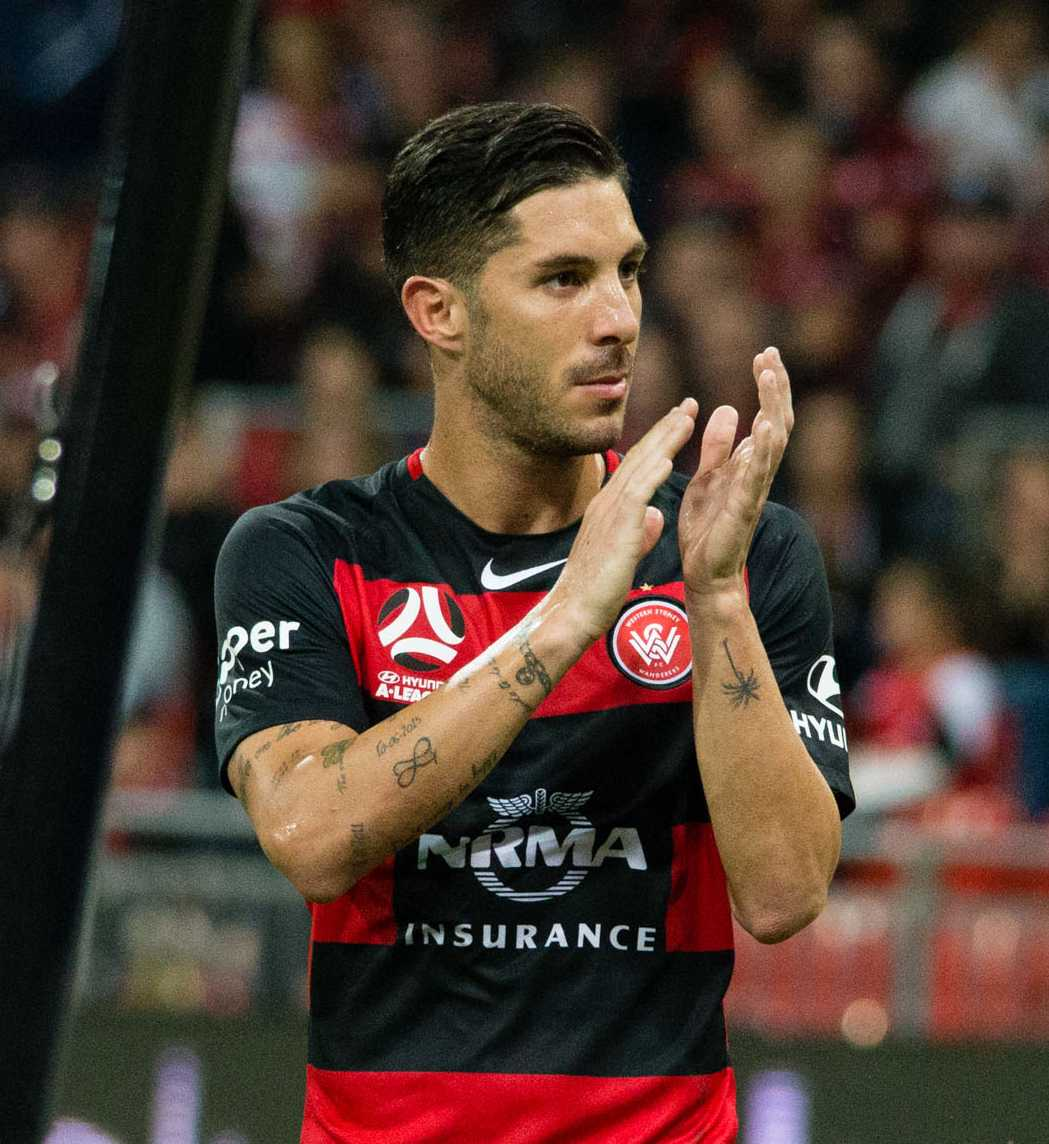
- Cejudo with Western Sydney Wanderers in 2017

Personal information
- Full name: Álvaro Cejudo Carmona
- Date of birth: 29 January 1984 (age 42)
- Place of birth: Puente Genil, Spain
- Height: 1.80 m (5 ft 11 in)
- Position: Winger

Team information
- Current team: Las Palmas (assistant)

Youth career
- 1998–2003: Betis

Senior career*
Years	Team	Apps	(Gls)
2002–2007	Betis B	81	(16)
2004	→ Coria (loan)	14	(0)
2007–2009	Ceuta	70	(13)
2009–2011	Las Palmas	50	(11)
2011–2014	Osasuna	109	(10)
2014–2017	Betis	77	(3)
2017–2018	Western Sydney Wanderers	20	(2)
2018–2021	Racing Santander	80	(16)
Total		501	(71)

Managerial career
- 2023–2024: Arucas (youth)
- 2024–2026: Puente Genil
- 2026–: Las Palmas (assistant)
- * Club domestic league appearances and goals

Álvaro Cejudo Carmona (Spanish pronunciation: [ˈalβaɾo θeˈxuðo]; born 29 January 1984) is a Spanish former professional footballer who played mainly as a right winger. He is the assistant manager of Segunda División club Las Palmas.

Brought up at Betis, he amassed La Liga totals of 156 matches and 12 goals over six seasons, with that club and Osasuna. He also played in Australia with Western Sydney Wanderers.

== Club career ==
=== Early years and Las Palmas ===
Born in Puente Genil, Córdoba, Cejudo played youth football with Real Betis but only appeared officially with the B side, competing with them in both Segunda División B and Tercera División. Leaving in the summer of 2007, he joined AD Ceuta at the latter level, where he spent two seasons.

In July 2009, Cejudo signed with UD Las Palmas from Segunda División. He played his first game as a professional on 29 August and scored in a 1–1 home draw with Real Sociedad, finishing his first year with 34 matches and six goals to help the Canary Islands team narrowly avoid relegation.

=== Osasuna ===
Cejudo moved to La Liga with CA Osasuna in the 2011 January transfer window, agreeing to a €320,000 deal in order to replace Atlético Madrid-bound Juanfran. He netted his first goal in the competition on 21 May, the game's only at home against Villarreal CF.

=== Betis ===
On 11 August 2014, Cejudo returned to Betis after agreeing to a three-year deal. He contributed 30 games and one goal in his first season, helping the club return to the top division after a one-year absence.

Cejudo appeared in the same number of matches the following campaign, scoring in a 1–1 home draw against Real Madrid.

=== Western Sydney Wanderers ===
On 24 July 2017, after failing to renew his contract, the 33-year-old Cejudo joined A-League team Western Sydney Wanderers FC as a marquee player. At the end of the season, he was released.

=== Racing Santander ===
On 28 July 2018, Cejudo returned to Spain and joined Racing de Santander on a two-year contract. In May 2021, having experienced one promotion and one relegation, the 37-year-old announced his retirement.

== Career statistics ==
Appearances and goals by club, season and competition
Club	Season	League			Cup		Other		Total	
Club	Season	Division	Apps	Goals	Apps	Goals	Apps	Goals	Apps	Goals
Ceuta	2007–08	Segunda División B	35	4	0	0	4 (Note: Appearances in Segunda División B play-offs)	0	39	4
Ceuta	2008–09	Segunda División B	35	9	1	0	—		36	9
Ceuta	Total		70	13	1	0	4	0	75	13
Las Palmas	2009–10	Segunda División	34	5	2	0	—		36	5
Las Palmas	2010–11	Segunda División	16	6	0	0	—		16	6
Las Palmas	Total		50	11	2	0	—		52	11
Osasuna	2010–11	La Liga	13	1	0	0	—		13	1
Osasuna	2011–12	La Liga	34	4	4	0	—		38	4
Osasuna	2012–13	La Liga	32	3	3	0	—		35	3
Osasuna	2013–14	La Liga	30	2	3	0	—		33	2
Osasuna	Total		109	10	10	0	—		119	10
Betis	2014–15	Segunda División	30	1	3	0	—		33	1
Betis	2015–16	La Liga	30	1	1	1	—		31	2
Betis	2016–17	La Liga	17	1	0	0	—		17	1
Betis	Total		77	3	4	1	—		81	4
Western Sydney Wanderers	2017–18	A-League	20	2	1	0	—		21	2
Racing Santander	2018–19	Segunda División B	26	5	3	0	2	0	31	5
Racing Santander	2019–20	Segunda División	31	9	0	0	—		31	9
Racing Santander	2020–21	Segunda División B	23	2	0	0	—		23	2
Racing Santander	Total		80	16	3	0	2	0	85	16
Career total			406	55	21	1	6	0	433	56

== Honours ==
Betis

- Segunda División: 2014–15
