= Bruno González =

Spanish footballer

Bruno
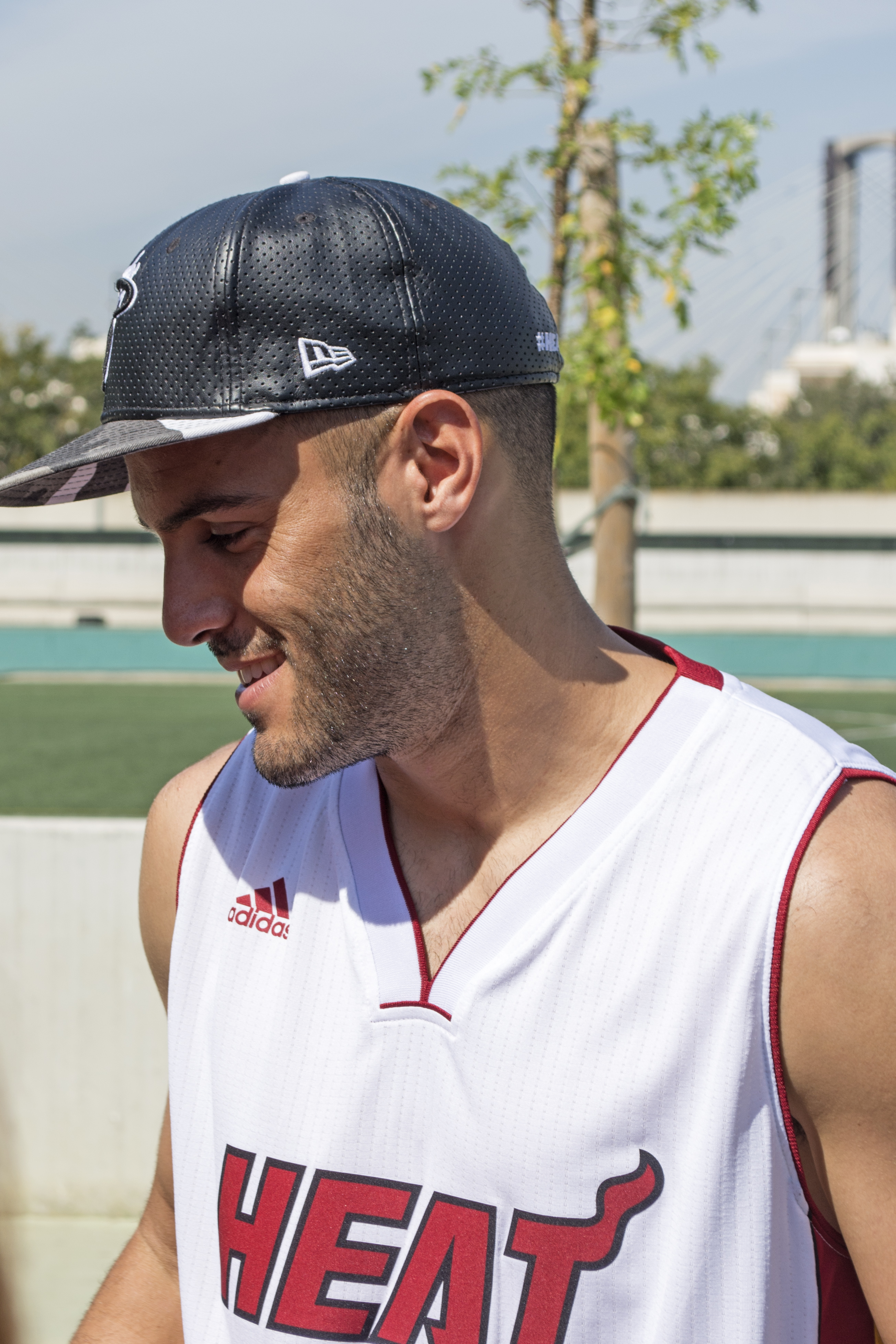

Personal information
- Full name: Bruno González Cabrera
- Date of birth: 24 May 1990 (age 36)
- Place of birth: Las Galletas, Spain
- Height: 1.85 m (6 ft 1 in)
- Position: Centre-back

Youth career
- Tenerife

Senior career*
Years	Team	Apps	(Gls)
2009–2011	Tenerife B	43	(3)
2011–2014	Tenerife	77	(3)
2011–2012	→ Teruel (loan)	27	(1)
2014–2017	Betis	81	(3)
2017–2020	Getafe	45	(0)
2020	Levante	6	(0)
2020–2021	Valladolid	28	(1)
2021–2022	Leganés	20	(0)
2022–2023	Sporting Gijón	12	(0)
- * Club domestic league appearances and goals as of 13:35, 22 June 2023 (UTC)

Bruno González Cabrera (born 24 May 1990), known simply as Bruno, is a Spanish professional footballer who plays as a central defender.

== Club career ==
=== Tenerife ===
Bruno was born in Las Galletas, Tenerife, Canary Islands. A product of local CD Tenerife's youth ranks, he made his senior debut with the reserves in 2009–10, being relegated from Segunda División B. On 4 June 2011, he played his first official game with the first team, a 1–0 away loss against neighbouring UD Las Palmas which was his only Segunda División appearance of the season, ended in the same fashion for the main squad.

In August 2011, Bruno was loaned to CD Teruel of the third division in a season-long move. He subsequently returned to Tenerife in the summer of 2012 and was definitely promoted to the first team, appearing in 38 matches in 2012–13 as they returned to the second tier after a two-year absence.

Bruno scored his first goal as a professional on 1 December 2013, closing the 2–2 draw at Girona FC.

=== Betis ===
On 6 July 2014, the free agent Bruno signed a three-year deal with Real Betis in the same league. He made 33 appearances and scored two goals for the Verdiblancos in his debut season, as they returned to La Liga at the first attempt.

Bruno made his debut in the competition on 23 August 2015, starting in a 1–1 home draw against Villarreal CF. He scored his first goal in the Spanish top flight on 18 November 2016, the first in the 2–0 win over UD Las Palmas also at the Estadio Benito Villamarín.

=== Later career ===
On 7 July 2017, Bruno agreed to a three-year contract at Getafe CF. In January 2020, deemed surplus to requirements by manager José Bordalás as several other Spanish players, he joined Levante UD until 30 June. On 4 July, he terminated his contract with the latter club and signed a two-year deal with fellow top-tier side Real Valladolid on 11 August.

On 31 August 2021, after Valladolid's relegation, Bruno severed his ties with them and moved to CD Leganés on a one-year contract hours later. On 14 November 2022, he joined Sporting de Gijón also in division two for one season.
