= 2019–20 UD Almería season =

UD Almería
2019–20 season
- President: Turki Al-Sheikh
- Head coach: Guti
- Stadium: Juegos Mediterráneos
- Segunda División: 4th
- Copa del Rey: First round
- Play-offs: Semi-finals
- Top goalscorer: League: Darwin Núñez (16); All: Darwin Núñez (16)
- Highest home attendance: 13,082 vs. Cádiz (29 Sep)
- Lowest home attendance: 7,395 vs. Albacete (17 Aug)
Home colours	Away colours

The 2019–20 season was UD Almería's twentieth ninth season of existence and the fifth consecutive in Segunda División. The season covered a period from 1 July 2019 to 16 August 2020.

== Squad ==
As of 24 August 2020

No.	Name	Pos.	Nat.	Place of birth	Date of birth (age)	Club caps	Club goals	Int. caps	Int. goals	Signed from	Date signed	Fee	Contract End
Goalkeepers
1	Antonio Sivera	GK	(Spain) (Valencian Community)	Xàbia	11 August 1996 (aged 24)	6	0	–	–	Alavés	13 January 2020	Loan	16 August 2020
13	Fernando (c)	GK	(Spain) (Region of Murcia)	Murcia	10 June 1990 (aged 30)	33	0	–	–	UCAM Murcia	5 July 2017	Free	30 June 2021
30	Jero Lario	GK	(Spain) (Region of Murcia)	Lorca	7 February 1995 (aged 25)	–	–	–	–	Almería B	1 February 2019	Free	16 August 2020
42	Lluis Tarrés	GK	(Spain) (Catalonia)	Blanes	16 March 2001 (aged 19)	–	–	–	–	Almería B	16 August 2020	Free	Undisclosed
Defenders
2	Francis Guerrero	RB/RW	(Spain) (Andalusia)	Coín	11 March 1996 (aged 24)	7	0	–	–	Betis	31 January 2020	Loan	16 August 2020
3	Iván Martos	LB/CB	(Spain) (Catalonia)	Manresa	15 May 1997 (aged 23)	68	0	–	–	Almería B	7 December 2017	Free	30 June 2022
4	José Romera	RB	(Spain) (Valencian Community)	Xirivella	8 September 1987 (aged 32)	59	1	–	–	Dinamo B. (Romania)	12 July 2018	Free	30 June 2021
12	Jonathan	LB	(Brazil)	Japeri (Rio de Janeiro (state))	3 March 1998 (aged 22)	22	0	–	–	Botafogo (Brazil)	20 August 2019	€ 1M	30 June 2024
15	Juan Ibiza	CB	(Spain) (Balearic Islands)	Ibiza	17 August 1995 (aged 24)	33	0	–	–	Villarreal	10 July 2019	Undisc.	30 June 2022
18	Nikola Maraš	CB	(Serbia)	Belgrade (Socialist Federal Republic of Yugoslavia)	19 December 1995 (aged 24)	39	3	2	0	Chaves (Portugal)	15 August 2019	Loan	16 August 2020
20	Iván Balliu	RB	(Albania)	Caldes (Spain)	1 January 1992 (aged 28)	32	1	2	0	Metz (France)	12 August 2019	Free	30 June 2021
22	Valentine Ozornwafor	CB	(Nigeria)	Port Harcourt	1 June 1999 (aged 21)	5	1	–	–	Galatasaray (Turkey)	22 August 2019	Loan	16 August 2020
24	David Costas	CB	(Spain) (Galicia (Spain))	Vigo	26 March 1995 (aged 25)	17	0	–	–	Celta	25 January 2020	Loan	16 August 2020
49	Fermín Ruiz	LB	(Spain) (Andalusia)	Gójar	13 June 1997 (aged 23)	1	0	–	–	Almería B	18 December 2019	Free	Undisclosed
50	Fran Vertiz	RB	(Spain) (Andalusia)	Almería	10 September 2001 (aged 18)	–	–	–	–	Almería B	18 December 2019	Free	Undisclosed
Midfielders
5	Sergio Aguza	CM/AM	(Spain) (Catalonia)	Sant Boi	2 September 1992 (aged 27)	43	5	–	–	Córdoba	13 July 2018	Free	30 June 2023
6	César de la Hoz	CM	(Spain) (Cantabria)	Orejo	30 March 1992 (aged 28)	77	3	–	–	Betis	4 July 2018	Free	30 June 2022
7	Enzo Fernández	AM/LW/RW	(France)	Bordeaux	24 March 1995 (aged 25)	4	0	–	–	Aves	31 January 2020	Loan	16 August 2020
8	Radosav Petrović	CM	(Serbia)	Ub (Socialist Federal Republic of Yugoslavia)	8 March 1989 (aged 31)	28	1	44	2	Sporting CP (Portugal)	19 August 2019	Undisc.	30 June 2022
10	Fran Villalba	AM	(Spain) (Valencian Community)	Valencia	11 May 1998 (aged 22)	18	2	–	–	Birmingham (England)	27 January 2020	Loan	16 August 2020
14	Wilfrid Kaptoum	CM/AM	(Cameroon)	Douala	7 July 1996 (aged 24)	8	0	–	–	Betis	10 January 2020	Loan	16 August 2020
16	José Lazo	LW	(Spain) (Andalusia)	Sanlúcar	16 February 1996 (aged 24)	37	10	–	–	Getafe	20 August 2019	€ 4M	30 June 2024
17	José Corpas	RW	(Spain) (Andalusia)	Baños de la Encina	7 July 1991 (aged 29)	80	7	–	–	Marbella	3 July 2018	Free	30 June 2022
19	Ante Ćorić	AM/RW	(Croatia)	Zagreb	14 April 1997 (aged 23)	17	0	4	0	Roma (Italy)	27 August 2019	Loan	16 August 2020
23	Valentín Vada	CM/AM	(Argentina)	Santa Fe	6 March 1996 (aged 24)	34	2	–	–	Bordeaux (France)	23 August 2019	Undisc.	30 June 2024
26	Francisco Callejón	CM	(Spain) (Andalusia)	Pujaire	15 May 1998 (aged 22)	7	0	–	–	Almería B	8 April 2017	Free	30 June 2023
27	Dani Albiar	AM/ST	(Spain) (Region of Murcia)	Cartagena	8 January 2000 (aged 20)	3	0	–	–	Almería B	18 December 2019	Free	30 June 2021
31	Arvin Appiah	RW/LW	(England)	Amsterdam (Netherlands)	5 January 2001 (aged 19)	24	1	–	–	Nottm' Forest (England)	2 September 2019	£ 8M	30 June 2024
43	Nano	AM/LW	(Spain) (Andalusia)	Ugijar	23 July 1997 (aged 23)	–	–	–	–	Almería B	11 October 2019	Free	Undisclosed
Forwards
11	Juan Muñoz	ST	(Spain) (Andalusia)	Utrera	12 November 1995 (aged 24)	35	9	–	–	Leganés	2 September 2019	Loan	16 August 2020
21	Darwin Núñez	ST	(Uruguay)	Artigas	24 June 1999 (aged 21)	32	16	1	1	Peñarol (Uruguay)	29 August 2019	US$4.5M	30 June 2024
32	Nacho Díaz	ST	(Spain) (Andalusia)	Jaén	27 June 2000 (aged 20)	–	–	–	–	Almería B	25 January 2020	Free	Undisclosed
34	Rubén Enri	ST	(Spain) (Catalonia)	Barcelona	10 April 1998 (aged 22)	2	0	–	–	Reus	9 July 2019	Free	30 June 2024
36	Iván Barbero	ST	(Spain) (Andalusia)	Roquetas de Mar	17 August 1998 (aged 21)	10	0	–	–	Osasuna	30 January 2020	Loan	16 August 2020

== Transfers ==
=== In ===
No.	Pos.	Nat.	Name	Age	EU	Moving from	Type	Transfer window	Ends	Transfer fee	Source
2	DF	(Dominican Republic)	Tano Bonnín	28	EU	Lleida Esportiu	Transfer	Summer	2021	Free	UD Almería
—		(Spain)	Óscar Fernández	44	EU	Atlético Madrid B	Job offer	Summer	2020	Free	UD Almería
19	FW	(Spain)	Simón Moreno	21	EU	Villarreal B	Loan	Summer	2020	Free	Marca
11	MF	(France)	Yanis Rahmani	24	EU	Mirandés	Transfer	Summer	2021	Free	Diario AS
15	DF	(Spain)	Juan Ibiza	23	EU	Villarreal	Transfer	Summer	2022	Undisclosed	UD Almería
14	MF	(Belgium)	Aristote Nkaka	23	EU	Anderlecht (Belgium)	Loan	Summer	2020	Free	UD Almería
—	DF	(Uruguay)	Gianni Rodríguez	25	EU	San Martín (Argentina)	Transfer	Summer	2021	Free	UD Almería
—	FW	(Uruguay)	Gonzalo Bueno	26	EU	Patriotas (Colombia)	Transfer	Summer	2021	Free	UD Almería
—	DF	(France)	Mathieu Peybernes	28	EU	Lorient (France)	Transfer	Summer	2022	Undisclosed	UD Almería
—		(Portugal)	Pedro Emanuel	44	EU	Al-Taawoun (Saudi Arabia)	Job offer	Summer	2020	Free	UD Almería
20	DF	(Spain)	Iván Balliu	27	EU	Metz (France)	Transfer	Summer	2021	Free	UD Almería
18	DF	(Serbia)	Nikola Maraš	23	EU	Chaves (Portugal)	Loan	Summer	2020	Free	UD Almería
25	GK	(Serbia)	Dragan Rosić	22	EU	Mladost Lučani (Serbia)	Transfer	Summer	2024	Undisclosed	UD Almería
8	MF	(Serbia)	Radosav Petrović	30	EU	Sporting CP (Portugal)	Transfer	Summer	2022	Undisclosed	UD Almería
12	DF	(Brazil)	Jonathan	21	Non-EU	Botafogo (Brazil)	Transfer	Summer	2024	€1M	Marca
16	MF	(Spain)	José Lazo	23	EU	Getafe	Loan	Summer	2020	Free	Marca
22	DF	(Nigeria)	Valentine Ozornwafor	20	Non-EU	Galatasaray (Turkey)	Loan	Summer	2020	Free	Galatasaray SK
23	MF	(Argentina)	Valentín Vada	23	EU	Bordeaux (France)	Transfer	Summer	2024	Undisclosed	UD Almería
19	MF	(Croatia)	Ante Ćorić	22	EU	Roma (Italy)	Loan	Summer	2020	Free	UD Almería
21	FW	(Uruguay)	Darwin Núñez	20	Non-EU	Peñarol (Uruguay)	Transfer	Summer	2024	Undisclosed	UD Almería
11	FW	(Spain)	Juan Muñoz	23	EU	Leganés	Loan	Summer	2020	Free	CD Leganés
31	FW	(England)	Arvin Appiah	18	EU	Nottingham Forest (England)	Transfer	Summer	2024	Undisclosed	UD Almería
14	MF	(Cameroon)	Wilfrid Kaptoum	23	EU	Betis	Loan	Winter	2020	Free	
13	GK	(Spain)	Antonio Sivera	23	EU	Alavés	Loan	Winter	2020	Free	
24	DF	(Spain)	David Costas	24	EU	Celta	Loan	Winter	2020	Free	
11	MF	(Spain)	Fran Villalba	21	EU	Birmingham City (England)	Loan	Winter	2020	Free	
36	FW	(Spain)	Iván Barbero	21	EU	Osasuna	Loan	Winter	2020	Free	
2	DF	(Spain)	Francis Guerrero	23	EU	Betis	Loan	Winter	2020	Free	
7	MF	(France)	Enzo Fernández	24	EU	Aves (Portugal)	Loan	Winter	2020	Free	

Total spending: ▼€1,000,000

=== Out ===
No.	Pos.	Nat.	Name	Age	EU	Moving to	Type	Transfer window	Transfer fee	Source
2	DF	(Spain)	Fran Rodríguez	24	EU	Rayo Majadahonda	Contract ended	Summer	Free	
5	DF	(Spain)	Ángel Trujillo	31	EU	Free agent	Contract ended	Summer	Free	
23	MF	(Spain)	David Rocha	34	EU	Extremadura	Contract ended	Summer	Free	
9	FW	(Argentina)	Pablo Caballero	32	Non-EU	Cartagena	Contract ended	Summer	Free	
21	DF	(Spain)	Nano	34	EU	Recreativo Huelva	Contract ended	Summer	Free	
10	MF	(Spain)	Juan Carlos Real	28	EU	Huesca	Contract ended	Summer	Free	
15	DF	(Spain)	Juan Ibiza	23	EU	Villarreal	Loan return	Summer	Free	
18	DF	(Spain)	Andoni López	23	EU	Athletic Bilbao	Loan return	Summer	Free	
12	MF	(Colombia)	Juanjo Narváez	24	EU	Betis	Loan return	Summer	Free	
11	FW	(Bosnia and Herzegovina)	Ermedin Demirović	21	EU	Alavés	Loan return	Summer	Free	
14	MF	(Spain)	Luis Rioja	25	EU	Alavés	Transfer	Summer	€2M	Deportivo Alavés
25	MF	(Cameroon)	Yan Eteki	21	EU	Sevilla	Transfer	Summer	€500K	ABC
—		(Spain)	Óscar Fernández	44	EU	Free agent	Contract rescinded	Summer	Free	UD Almería
20	FW	(Spain)	Álvaro Giménez	28	EU	Birmingham City (England)	Transfer	Summer	€1.5M	BBC Sport
22	DF	(Spain)	Adri Montoro	24	EU	Free agent	Contract rescinded	Summer	Free	UD Almería
14	MF	(Belgium)	Aristote Nkaka	23	EU	Racing Santnader	Loan rescinded	Summer	Free	UD Almería
—	MF	(Uruguay)	Gonzalo Bueno	26	EU	Free agent	Contract rescinded	Summer	Free	UD Almería
—	DF	(Uruguay)	Gianni Rodríguez	25	EU	Free agent	Contract rescinded	Summer	Free	Marca
19	FW	(Spain)	Simón Moreno	22	EU	Villarreal	Loan rescinded	Summer	Free	UD Almería
2	DF	(Dominican Republic)	Tano Bonnín	29	EU	Rapid București (Romania)	Contract rescinded	Summer	Free	Marca
11	MF	(France)	Yanis Rahmani	24	EU	Lugo	Loan	Summer	Free	UD Almería
—	DF	(France)	Mathieu Peybernes	28	EU	Lugo	Loan	Summer	Free	UD Almería
25	GK	(Serbia)	Dragan Rosić	23	EU	Celta B	Loan	Winter	Free	
24	DF	(Cameroon)	Lucien Owona	29	EU	Free agent	Contract rescinded	Winter	Free	
10	MF	(Spain)	Chema	22	EU	Albacete	Loan	Winter	Free	
1	GK	(Spain)	René	36	EU	Ponferradina	Loan	Winter	Free	
7	MF	(Spain)	Gaspar	22	EU	Al Wahda (United Arab Emirates)	Transfer	Winter	Undisclosed	
9	FW	(Senegal)	Sekou Gassama	24	EU	Valladolid	Transfer	Winter	Undisclosed	

Total gaining: ▲€0

Balance

Total: ▼€1,000,000

== Coaches ==
Name	Nat.	Place of birth	Date of birth (age)	Signed from	Date signed	Role	G	W	D	L	%	Departure	Manner	Contract End
Óscar Fernández	(Spain) (Valencian Community)	Valencia	28 September 1974 (age 52)	Atlético B	15 June 2019	Permanent	0	0	0	0	—	3 August 2019	Sacked	30 June 2020
Pedro Emanuel	(Portugal)	Luanda (Angola)	11 February 1975 (age 51)	Al-Taawoun (Saudi Arabia)	4 August 2019	Permanent	14	6	6	2	42.86	4 November 2019	Sacked	30 June 2020
Guti	(Spain) (Community of Madrid)	Torrejón de Ardoz	31 October 1976 (age 50)	Beşiktaş (Turkey)	5 November 2019	Permanent	22	9	5	8	40.91	25 June 2020	Sacked	30 June 2020
Mário Silva	(Portugal)	Porto	24 April 1977 (age 49)	Board member	26 June 2020	Permanent	7	2	2	3	28.57	27 July 2020	Sacked	12 August 2020
José Gomes	(Portugal)	Matosinhos	28 August 1970 (age 56)	Marítimo (Portugal)	27 July 2020	Permanent	2	0	0	2	0.00			30 June 2021

=== Staff members ===
Name	Staff role
Jorge Mendonça	Assistant coach
André Bikey	Assistant coach
Víctor Fortes	Fitness coach
Jaime Milheiro	Fitness coach
Ricardo Molina	Goalkeeping coach
Jorge Baptista	Goalkeeping coach
João Penedo	Analyst
Cláudio Lopes	Analyst

Source: UD Almería's official website

== Player statistics ==
=== Appearances and goals ===
Last updated on 25 July 2020.

No.	Pos	Nat	Player	Total		Segunda División		Copa del Rey		Play-offs	
No.	Pos	Nat	Player	Apps	Goals	Apps	Goals	Apps	Goals	Apps	Goals
Goalkeepers
1	GK	(Spain) ESP	Antonio Sivera	6	0	3+1	0	0	0	2	0
13	GK	(Spain) ESP	Fernando	24	0	24	0	0	0	0	0
30	GK	(Spain) ESP	Jero Lario	0	0	0	0	0	0	0	0
42	GK	(Spain) ESP	Lluis Tarrés	0	0	0	0	0	0	0	0
Defenders
2	DF	(Spain) ESP	Francis Guerrero	7	0	3+4	0	0	0	0	0
3	DF	(Spain) ESP	Iván Martos	41	0	34+5	0	0	0	2	0
4	DF	(Spain) ESP	José Romera	21	1	16+4	1	1	0	0	0
12	DF	(Brazil) BRA	Jonathan	22	0	13+9	0	0	0	0	0
15	DF	(Spain) ESP	Juan Ibiza	8	0	7+1	0	0	0	0	0
18	DF	(Serbia) SRB	Nikola Maraš	39	3	35+1	2	1	1	2	0
20	DF	(Albania) ALB	Iván Balliu	32	1	25+5	1	0	0	2	0
22	DF	(Nigeria) NGR	Valentine Ozornwafor	5	1	2+1	0	1	1	1	0
24	DF	(Spain) ESP	David Costas	17	0	15	0	0	0	2	0
49	DF	(Spain) ESP	Fermín Ruiz	1	0	0	0	1	0	0	0
50	DF	(Spain) ESP	Fran Vertiz	0	0	0	0	0	0	0	0
Midfielders
5	MF	(Spain) ESP	Sergio Aguza	27	3	16+10	3	1	0	0	0
6	MF	(Spain) ESP	César de la Hoz	36	2	30+4	2	0	0	2	0
7	MF	(France) FRA	Enzo Fernández	4	0	1+2	0	0	0	0+1	0
8	MF	(Serbia) SRB	Radosav Petrović	28	1	20+7	1	0	0	0+1	0
10	MF	(Spain) ESP	Fran Villalba	18	2	10+6	2	0	0	1+1	0
14	MF	(Cameroon) CMR	Wilfrid Kaptoum	8	0	6+2	0	0	0	0	0
16	MF	(Spain) ESP	José Lazo	37	10	28+7	9	0	0	2	1
17	MF	(Spain) ESP	José Corpas	38	4	29+6	4	0+1	0	1+1	0
19	MF	(Croatia) CRO	Ante Ćorić	17	0	5+11	0	1	0	0	0
23	MF	(Argentina) ARG	Valentín Vada	34	2	25+7	2	0	0	1+1	0
26	MF	(Spain) ESP	Francisco Callejón	2	0	1	0	0	0	1	0
27	MF	(Spain) ESP	Dani Albiar	3	0	0+1	0	0+1	0	0+1	0
43	MF	(Spain) ESP	Nano	0	0	0	0	0	0	0	0
Forwards
11	FW	(Spain) ESP	Juan Muñoz	35	9	19+15	9	0	0	1	0
21	FW	(Uruguay) URU	Darwin Núñez	32	16	28+2	16	0	0	2	0
31	FW	(England) ENG	Arvin Appiah	24	1	10+11	1	1	0	0+2	0
32	FW	(Spain) ESP	Nacho Díaz	0	0	0	0	0	0	0	0
34	FW	(Spain) ESP	Rubén Enri	2	0	0+1	0	0+1	0	0	0
36	FW	(Spain) ESP	Iván Barbero	10	0	1+8	0	0	0	0+1	0
Players on loan to other clubs
1	GK	(Spain) ESP	René	16	0	15	0	1	0	0	0
10	MF	(Spain) ESP	Chema	11	0	8+2	0	1	0	0	0
11	MF	(France) FRA	Yanis Rahmani	2	0	0+2	0	0	0	0	0
25	GK	(Serbia) SRB	Dragan Rosić	0	0	0	0	0	0	0	0
Players who left the club midway through the season
2	DF	(Dominican Republic) DOM	Tano Bonnín	0	0	0	0	0	0	0	0
7	MF	(Spain) ESP	Gaspar	11	0	9+1	0	1	0	0	0
9	FW	(Senegal) SEN	Sekou Gassama	15	6	10+4	6	1	0	0	0
14	MF	(Belgium) BEL	Aristote Nkaka	1	1	0+1	1	0	0	0	0
19	FW	(Spain) ESP	Simón Moreno	0	0	0	0	0	0	0	0
24	DF	(Cameroon) CMR	Lucien Owona	15	1	14+1	1	0	0	0	0

=== Top scorers ===
Place	Position	Nation	Number	Name	Segunda División	Copa del Rey	Play-offs	Total
1	FW	(Uruguay)	21	Darwin Núñez	16	0	0	16
2	MF	(Spain)	16	José Lazo	9	0	1	10
3	FW	(Spain)	11	Juan Muñoz	9	0	0	9
4	FW	(Senegal)	9	Sekou Gassama	6	0	0	6
5	MF	(Spain)	17	José Corpas	4	0	0	4
6	MF	(Spain)	5	Sergio Aguza	3	0	0	3
6	DF	(Serbia)	18	Nikola Maraš	2	1	0	3
7	MF	(Spain)	6	César de la Hoz	2	0	0	2
7	MF	(Spain)	10	Fran Villalba	2	0	0	2
7	MF	(Argentina)	23	Valentín Vada	2	0	0	2
7	DF	(Spain)	4	José Romera	1	0	0	1
7	MF	(Serbia)	8	Radosav Petrović	1	0	0	1
7	MF	(Belgium)	14	Aristote Nkaka	1	0	0	1
7	DF	(Albania)	20	Iván Balliu	1	0	0	1
7	DF	(Cameroon)	24	Lucien Owona	1	0	0	1
7	FW	(England)	31	Arvin Appiah	1	0	0	1
7	DF	(Nigeria)	22	Valentine Ozornwafor	0	1	0	1
				Own goals	1	0	0	1
				TOTALS	62	2	1	65

=== Disciplinary record ===
Number	Nation	Position	Name	Segunda División			Copa del Rey			Play-offs			Total		
Number	Nation	Position	Name	Yellow card	(yellow card) (yellow-red card)	Red card	Yellow card	(yellow card) (yellow-red card)	Red card	Yellow card	(yellow card) (yellow-red card)	Red card	Yellow card	(yellow card) (yellow-red card)	Red card
8	(Serbia)	MF	Radosav Petrović	11	1	0	0	0	0	1	0	0	12	1	0
3	(Spain)	DF	Iván Martos	12	0	0	0	0	0	0	0	0	12	0	0
23	(Argentina)	MF	Valentín Vada	11	0	0	0	0	0	1	0	0	12	0	0
6	(Spain)	MF	César de la Hoz	9	0	1	0	0	0	0	0	0	9	0	1
18	(Serbia)	DF	Nikola Maraš	9	0	0	0	0	0	0	0	0	9	0	0
20	(Albania)	DF	Iván Balliu	8	0	1	0	0	0	0	0	0	8	0	1
16	(Spain)	MF	José Lazo	6	0	0	0	0	0	0	0	0	6	0	0
17	(Spain)	MF	José Corpas	5	1	0	0	0	0	0	0	0	5	1	0
5	(Spain)	MF	Sergio Aguza	5	0	0	0	0	0	0	0	0	5	0	0
12	(Brazil)	DF	Jonathan	5	0	0	0	0	0	0	0	0	5	0	0
24	(Spain)	DF	David Costas	4	0	0	0	0	0	1	0	0	5	0	0
4	(Spain)	DF	José Romera	4	0	0	0	0	0	0	0	0	4	0	0
11	(Spain)	FW	Juan Muñoz	4	0	0	0	0	0	0	0	0	4	0	0
10	(Spain)	MF	Fran Villalba	3	0	0	0	0	0	0	0	0	3	0	0
31	(England)	FW	Arvin Appiah	3	0	0	0	0	0	0	0	0	3	0	0
22	(Nigeria)	DF	Valentine Ozornwafor	1	0	1	1	0	0	0	0	0	2	0	1
21	(Uruguay)	FW	Darwin Núñez	2	1	0	0	0	0	0	0	0	2	1	0
8	(Spain)	MF	Chema	2	0	0	0	0	0	0	0	0	2	0	0
13	(Spain)	GK	Fernando	2	0	0	0	0	0	0	0	0	2	0	0
19	(Croatia)	MF	Ante Ćorić	1	0	0	1	0	0	0	0	0	2	0	0
2	(Spain)	DF	Francis Guerrero	1	0	0	0	0	0	0	0	0	1	0	0
7	(France)	MF	Enzo Fernández	1	0	0	0	0	0	0	0	0	1	0	0
9	(Senegal)	FW	Sekou Gassama	1	0	0	0	0	0	0	0	0	1	0	0
11	(France)	MF	Yanis Rahmani	1	0	0	0	0	0	0	0	0	1	0	0
14	(Cameroon)	MF	Wilfrid Kaptoum	1	0	0	0	0	0	0	0	0	1	0	0
15	(Spain)	DF	Juan Ibiza	1	0	0	0	0	0	0	0	0	1	0	0
26	(Spain)	MF	Francisco Callejón	1	0	0	0	0	0	0	0	0	1	0	0
36	(Spain)	FW	Iván Barbero	1	0	0	0	0	0	0	0	0	1	0	0
7	(Spain)	MF	Gaspar	0	0	0	1	0	0	0	0	0	1	0	0
			TOTALS	115	3	3	3	0	0	3	0	0	121	3	3

== Pre-season and friendlies ==
Win Draw Loss

20 July 2019 Friendly	El Ejido	0–1	Almería	El Ejido
20:00 CEST		Report	6' Álvaro	Stadium: Estadio Municipal Santo Domingo

25 July 2019 Friendly	Levante	2–0	Almería	San Pedro del Pinatar
19:30 CEST	Vezo 8'; Rochina 80'	Report		Stadium: Pinatar Arena; Referee: Elia María Martínez Martínez

26 July 2019 Friendly	Murcia	0–2	Almería	San Pedro del Pinatar
20:00 CEST		Report	21' Sekou; 67' Moreno	Stadium: Pinatar Arena

29 July 2019 Friendly	Granada	1–0	Almería	San Pedro del Pinatar
19:30 CEST	Azeez 45'	Report		Stadium: Pinatar Arena

2 August 2019 Friendly	Las Palmas	1–1	Almería	Marbella
20:00 CEST	Timor 27' (pen.)	Report	18' Moreno	Stadium: Marbella Football Center; Referee: Paradas Mazuela

4 August 2019 Friendly	Marbella	Cancelled	Almería	Marbella
19:30 CEST				Stadium: Marbella Football Center
Note: Match not played due to Almería's change of ownership

? August 2019 Friendly	Almería	1–0	Almería B	Almería
9:00 CEST	Moreno 1'	Report		Stadium: Anexo; Referee: Francisco José Fernández Cintas

10 August 2019 Friendly	Almería	0–2	Elche	Almería
19:30 CEST		Report	19' Qasmi; 60' Milla	Stadium: Juegos Mediterráneos; Referee: Juan A. Sánchez Villalobos

== Competitions ==
=== Overview ===
Competition	First match	Last match	Starting round	Final position	Record							
Competition	First match	Last match	Starting round	Final position	Pld	W	D	L	GF	GA	GD	Win %
Segunda División	17 August 2019	20 July 2020	Matchday 1	4th	42	17	13	12	62	43	+19	40.48
Segunda División promotion play-offs	13 August 2020	16 August 2020	Semi-finals	Semi-finals	2	0	0	2	1	3	−2	0.00
Copa del Rey	19 December 2019		First round	First round	1	0	0	1	2	3	−1	0.00
Total					45	17	13	15	65	49	+16	37.78

Last updated: 16 August 2020
Source: Competitions

=== Segunda División ===
Pos	Team	Pld	W	D	L	GF	GA	GD	Pts	Promotion, qualification or relegation
2	Cádiz (P)	42	19	12	11	50	39	+11	69	Promotion to La Liga
3	Zaragoza	42	18	11	13	59	53	+6	65	Qualification to promotion play-offs
4	Almería	42	17	13	12	62	43	+19	64	Qualification to promotion play-offs
5	Girona	42	17	12	13	48	43	+5	63	Qualification to promotion play-offs
6	Elche (O, P)	42	16	13	13	52	44	+8	61	Qualification to promotion play-offs

Source: LaLiga Soccerway
Rules for classification: 1) points; 2) head-to-head points; 3) head-to-head goal difference; 4) goal difference; 5) number of goals scored
(O) Play-off winners; (P) Promoted

==== Results summary ====
Overall								Home						Away					
Pld	W	D	L	GF	GA	GD	Pts	W	D	L	GF	GA	GD	W	D	L	GF	GA	GD
42	17	13	12	62	43	+19	64	10	4	7	30	19	+11	7	9	5	32	24	+8

Last updated: 20 July 2020.
Source: Competitive matches

==== Results by round ====
Round	1	2	3	4	5	6	7	8	9	10	11	12	13	14	15	16	17	18	19	20	21	22	23	24	25	26	27	28	29	30	31	32	33	34	35	36	37	38	39	40	41	42
Ground	H	A	H	A	A	H	A	H	A	A	H	A	H	A	H	A	H	A	H	A	H	A	H	A	H	A	H	A	H	A	H	A	H	A	H	A	H	H	A	H	A	H
Result	W	D	W	W	W	W	D	L	L	D	D	D	W	D	D	D	W	W	W	D	L	W	W	W	L	D	L	L	D	L	W	W	L	W	L	D	W	L	L	W	L	D
Position	1	4	3	3	3	1	1	2	2	2	2	2	2	3	3	3	2	2	2	2	2	2	2	2	3	3	3	3	3	3	3	3	3	3	3	4	4	4	4	3	3	4

Updated to match(es) played on 20 July 2020. Source:
A = Away; H = Home; W = Win; D = Draw; L = Loss

==== Matches ====
The fixtures were revealed on 4 July 2019.

17 August 2019 1	Almería	3–0	Albacete	Almería
19:00 CEST	Aguza 67' (pen.) 90+7'; Nkaka 82'; Rahmani (yellow card) 90+4'		(yellow card) 90+2' Peña	Stadium: Juegos Mediterráneos; Attendance: 7,395; Referee: Aitor Gorostegui Fernández Ortega

24 August 2019 2	Racing Santander	1–1	Almería	Santander
18:00 CEST	Yoda 29'; Buñuel (yellow card) 89'; Sergio Ruiz (yellow card) 90+3'	Report	(yellow card) 38' Romera; 90+4' Sekou	Stadium: El Sardinero; Attendance: 11,402; Referee: Óliver De la Fuente Ramos

31 August 2019 3	Almería	1–0	Huesca	Almería
20:00 CEST	Sekou 4'; Aguza (penalty missed) 34'; Maraš (yellow card) 49'; Chema (yellow card) 71'		(yellow card) 89' Luisinho; (yellow card) 90+5' Juan Carlos	Stadium: Juegos Mediterráneos; Attendance: 9,542; Referee: Dámaso Arcediano Monescillo

7 September 2019 4	Málaga	0–1	Almería	Málaga
18:00 CEST	Rolón (yellow card) 19'; Boulahroud (yellow card) 82'; Sergio Ruiz (yellow card) 90+3'; Juankar (yellow card) 90+1'; Adrián (yellow card) 90+4'		9' Sekou; (yellow card) 20' Aguza; (yellow card) 51' Fernando; (yellow card) 74' Vada; (yellow card) 90' Martos	Stadium: La Rosaleda; Attendance: 18,068; Referee: Rubén Ávalos Barrera

14 September 2019 5	Las Palmas	0–3	Almería	Las Palmas
18:30 CEST	Mantovani (yellow card) 39'; Curbelo (yellow card) 66'; Drolé (yellow card) 75'		(yellow card) 19' Sekou; 22' Romera; (yellow card) 24' de la Hoz; 57' Corpas; (yellow card) 61' Chema; (yellow card) 85' Petrović; 87' Vada	Stadium: Gran Canaria; Attendance: 10,077; Referee: Aitor Gorostegui Fernández Ortega

17 September 2019 6	Almería	3–1	Girona	Almería
19:00 CEST	Sekou 13' 83' (pen.); Vada (yellow card) 42'; Lazo 76' de la Hoz (yellow card) 79'; Petrović (yellow card) 88'		(yellow card) 35' Granell; 56' Gual; (yellow card) 61' (yellow-red card) 81' Juanpe; (yellow card) 80' Maffeo	Stadium: Juegos Mediterráneos; Attendance: 11,034; Referee: José Antonio López Toca

21 September 2019 7	Rayo Vallecano	1–1	Almería	Madrid
20:00 CEST	Comesaña 48'; Pozo (yellow card) 67'		74' Muñoz; (yellow card) 84' Maraš	Stadium: Vallecas; Attendance: 9,098; Referee: Daniel Ocón Arráiz

29 September 2019 8	Almería	1–2	Cádiz	Almería
16:00 CEST	Maraš (yellow card) 36'; Corpas 79'; Martos (yellow card) 90+4'		(yellow card) 26' José Mari; 68' (yellow card) 72' Lozano; (red card) 76' Marcos Mauro; 89' Espino; (yellow card) 90+4' Alberto	Stadium: Juegos Mediterráneos; Attendance: 13,082; Referee: Daniel Jesús Trujillo Suárez

3 October 2019 9	Sporting Gijón	4–2	Almería	Gijón
19:00 CEST	Valiente 7'; Babin 14'; Aitor García 39' 45'; Đurđević (yellow card) 90+1'		23' (yellow card) 35' Petrović; (yellow card) 41' de la Hoz; (yellow card) 54' Jonathan; 67' Maraš; (yellow card) 71' Martos	Stadium: El Molinón; Attendance: 16,310; Referee: Álvaro Moreno Aragón

6 October 2019 10	Deportivo La Coruña	0–0	Almería	A Coruña
16:30 CEST	Bóveda (yellow card) 26'; Montero (yellow card) 66' (red card) 85'		(yellow card) 32' Appiah; (yellow card) 75' de la Hoz	Stadium: Riazor; Attendance: 15,722; Referee: Gorka Sagués Oscoz

12 October 2019 11	Almería	0–0	Lugo	Almería
16:00 CEST	Maraš (yellow card) 52'; Corpas (yellow card) 65'; Martos (yellow card) 68'; Petrović (yellow card) 85'		(yellow card) 41' Valentín; (yellow card) 80' Cantero; (yellow card) 81' Peybernes; (yellow card) 89' Rahmani	Stadium: Juegos Mediterráneos; Attendance: 10,246; Referee: Iosu Galech Apezteguia

19 October 2019 12	Alcorcón	2–2	Almería	Alcorcón
16:00 CEST	Stoichkov 10' (pen.) (yellow card) 28'; Romera (yellow card) 26'; Arribas (yellow card) 44'; Dorca (yellow card) 55' (yellow-red card) 75'; Boateng (yellow card) 61'; Costa 88' (yellow card) 90+6'		(yellow card) 11' (yellow-red card) 73' Corpas; (yellow card) 15' Balliu; (yellow card) 58' Vada; 63' de la Hoz; 86' Maraš	Stadium: Santo Domingo; Attendance: 2,611; Referee: Isidro Díaz de Mera Escuderos

27 October 2019 13	Almería	3–2	Extremadura	Almería
21:00 CET	Vada (yellow card) 53'; Núñez 64' (pen.); José Carlos Lazo 77' 84'; Balliu (yellow card) 83'	Summary	Nono 90+2'; Airam Cabrera 90+5'	Stadium: Juegos Mediterráneos; Attendance: 8,958; Referee: (Spain) Javier Iglesias

1 November 2019 14	Real Oviedo	0–0	Almería	Oviedo
21:00 CET	Tejera (yellow card) 14'	Summary	José Carlos Lazo (yellow card) 39'; Balliu (yellow card) 71'; Vada (yellow card) 90+1'	Stadium: Estadio Carlos Tartiere; Attendance: 11,389; Referee: (Spain) Dámaso Arcediano

10 November 2019 15	Almería	1–1	Real Zaragoza	Almería
16:00 CET	José Carlos Lazo (yellow card) 16'; Iván Martos (yellow card) 26'; Petrović (yellow card) 35'; Núñez 45'; Jonathan (yellow card) 83'	Summary	Igbekeme (yellow card) 44'; Miguel Linares 65'; Carlos Nieto (yellow card) 68'; Raúl Guti (yellow card) 87'	Stadium: Juegos Mediterráneos; Attendance: 10,441; Referee: (Spain) Rubén Ávalos

16 November 2019 16	Elche	1–1	Almería	Elche
18:30 CET	Fidel (yellow card) 13'; Iván Sánchez (yellow card) 27'; Nino 53'	Summary	Balliu (yellow card) 30'; Owona 85'; Vada (yellow card) 90+2'	Stadium: Estadio Manuel Martínez Valero; Attendance: 9,706; Referee: (Spain) Oliver De La Fuente

24 November 2019 17	Almería	2–0	Numancia	Almería
18:30 CET	Dani Barrio 4' (o.g.); Vada (yellow card) 22'; José Carlos Lazo 31'; Petrović (yellow card) 36' (yellow-red card) 74'; Sergio Aguza (yellow card) 70'	Summary	Carlos Gutiérrez (yellow card) 3'; Alberto Noguera (yellow card) 22'; Marc Mateu (yellow card) 29'; Iván Calero (yellow card) 69'	Stadium: Juegos Mediterráneos; Attendance: 9,584; Referee: (Spain) Isidro Díaz de Mera

30 November 2019 18	Tenerife	1–3	Almería	Santa Cruz de Tenerife
18:00 CET	Ortolá (yellow card) 9'; Matías Nahuel (yellow card) 9'; Borja Lasso 38'; Alberto Jiménez (yellow card) 59'; Carlos Ruiz (yellow card) 78'; Álex Muñoz (yellow card) 90+5'	Summary	José Carlos Lazo 27' 32'; Iván Martos (yellow card) 80'; Sergio Aguza 90+6'	Stadium: Estadio Heliodoro Rodríguez López; Attendance: 12,394; Referee: (Spain) Javier Iglesias

7 December 2019 19	Almería	3–1	Mirandés	Almería
20:00 CET	César de la Hoz (red card) 20'; Maraš (yellow card) 27'; Petrović (yellow card) 45+2'; Juan Muñoz 46'; Núñez 49'; Sergio Aguza (yellow card) 64'; José Carlos Lazo 72'; Balliu (yellow card) 85'	Summary	Maranhão 11'; Enric Franquesa (yellow card) 36'; Álvaro Peña (red card) 68'; Álvaro Rey (yellow card) 82'; Odei Onaindia (yellow card) 85'	Stadium: Juegos Mediterráneos; Attendance: 8,769; Referee: (Spain) Víctor Areces

15 December 2019 20	Fuenlabrada	2–2	Almería	Fuenlabrada
20:00 CET	Chico (yellow card) 16'; Antonio Cristian 61'; Iban Salvador 69'	Summary	Petrović (yellow card) 11'; Vada (yellow card) 30'; Romera (yellow card) 54'; Ozornwafor (yellow card) 63'; Juan Muñoz 78' (yellow card) 85'; Gassama 90+4'	Stadium: Estadio Fernando Torres; Attendance: 4,874; Referee: Dámaso Arcediano

22 December 2019 21	Almería	2–3	Ponferradina	Almería
12:00 CET	Vada (yellow card) 16'; Núñez 25' (pen.); Iván Martos (yellow card) 36'; Juan Muñoz 80'; Fernando Martínez (yellow card) 89'; José Carlos Lazo (yellow card) 90+4'	Summary	Caro (yellow card) 24'; Nacho Gil 56'; Fran Manzanara 61'; Yuri 74'	Stadium: Juegos Mediterráneos; Attendance: 10,106; Referee: Santiago Varón

4 January 2020 22	Lugo	0–4	Almería	Lugo
18:00 CET	Edu Campabadal (yellow card) 58'; Leuko (yellow card) 85'	Summary	Núñez 11' 60'; Iván Martos (yellow card) 28'; Juan Muñoz 42'; José Carlos Lazo 67'	Stadium: Estadio Anxo Carro; Attendance: 3,098; Referee: Aitor Gorostegui

16 January 2020 23	Almería	2–0	Real Oviedo	Almería
21:00 CET	Petrović (yellow card) 34'; Núñez 62' (pen.) 73'; José Carlos Lazo (yellow card) 71'; Balliu (yellow card) 85'	Summary		Stadium: Juegos Mediterráneos; Attendance: 8,862; Referee: (Spain) Oliver De La Fuente

19 January 2020 24	Extremadura	1–2	Almería	Almendralejo
20:30 CET	Nono (yellow card) 37'; Zarfino (yellow card) 39'; Cristian Rodríguez 41'	Summary	César de la Hoz (yellow card) 10'; Núñez 38' (pen.); Kaptoum (yellow card) 45+1'; Maraš (yellow card) 57'; Jonathan (yellow card) 68'; Juan Muñoz 86'	Stadium: Estadio Francisco de la Hera; Attendance: 5,109; Referee: Miguel Ortiz

26 January 2020 25	Almería	0–2	Elche	Almería
16:00 CET	Núñez (yellow card) 8' (yellow-red card) 38'; Maraš (yellow card) 35'; Vada (yellow card) 39'	Report	Óscar Gil (yellow card) 50'; Juan Cruz (yellow card) 57'; Calvo (yellow card) 59'; Fidel 63'; Verdú (yellow card) 67'; Badía (yellow card) 84'; Milla 88'	Stadium: Estadio de los Juegos Mediterráneos; Attendance: 11,237; Referee: Alejandro Muñiz

2 February 2020 26	Numancia	1–1	Almería	Soria
18:15 CET		Report		Stadium: Los Pajaritos

7 February 2020 27	Almería	0–1	Racing Santander	Almería
21:00 CET		Report	Cejudo 14'	Stadium: Juegos Mediterráneos; Attendance: 9,482; Referee: Jon Ander González Esteban

15 February 2020 28	Huesca	3–2	Almería	Huesca
16:00 CET		Report		Stadium: El Alcoraz

22 February 2020 29	Almería	0–0	Fuenlabrada	Almería
16:00 CET		Report		Stadium: Juegos Mediterráneos

29 February 2020 30	Cádiz	2–1	Almería	Cádiz
19:15 CET	Maraš 16' (o.g.); Álex 60'	Report	Corpas 10'	Stadium: Estadio Ramón de Carranza; Attendance: 17,599; Referee: Isidro Díaz de Mera Escuderos

7 March 2020 31	Almería	4–0	Deportivo La Coruña	Almería
21:00 CET				Stadium: Juegos Mediterráneos

14 June 2020 32	Albacete	0–1	Almería	Albacete
19:30 CEST		Report	Núñez 50' (pen.)	Stadium: Estadio Carlos Belmonte; Attendance: 0 Referee: Miguel Ángel Ortiz Arias

17 June 2020 33	Almería	0–1	Las Palmas	Almería
19:30 CEST		Report	Castro 23'	Stadium: Juegos Mediterráneos; Attendance: 0 Referee: Dámaso Arcediano Monescillo

20 June 2020 34	Real Zaragoza	0–2	Almería	Zaragoza
19:30 CEST	El Yamiq (yellow card) 2'; Francés (yellow card) 13'; Blanco (yellow card) 79'; Delmás (yellow card) 90+3'	Report	Appiah 12'; Costas (yellow card) 24'; Martos (yellow card) 66'; Villalba 69'	Stadium: La Romareda; Attendance: 0 Referee: Saúl Ais Reig

25 June 2020 35	Almería	0–1	Alcorcón	Almería
19:30 CEST	Appiah (yellow card) 4'; Balliu (yellow card) 63'; De la Hoz (yellow card) 82'; Maraš (yellow card) 87'; Muñoz (yellow card) 87'	Report	Ernesto 45'; Jiménez (yellow card) 72'; Bellvís (yellow card) 84'	Stadium: Estadio de los Juegos Mediterráneos; Attendance: 0 Referee: Iosu Galech Apezteguía

28 June 2020 36	Mirandés	2–2	Almería	Miranda de Ebro
17:00 CEST	Guridi 23'; Matheus (yellow card) 81'; Sánchez (yellow card) 84' (yellow-red card) 84'; Merquelanz 90+9' (pen.)	Report	Vada 1'; Corpas 45+2'; Balliu (yellow card) 90+1'; Ćorić (yellow card) 90+2'; Costas (yellow card) 90+5'; Villalba (yellow card) 90+10'	Stadium: Anduva; Attendance: 0 Referee: Iñaki Vicandi Garrido

1 July 2020 37	Almería	1–0	Sporting Gijón	Almería
19:30 CEST	De la Hoz 90'	Report		Stadium: Juegos Mediterráneos; Attendance: 0 Referee: José Antonio López Toca

4 July 2020 38	Almería	1–2	Tenerife	Almería
19:30 CEST				Stadium: Juegos Mediterráneos

9 July 2020 39	Girona	1–0	Almería	Girona
21:45 CEST	Juanpe (yellow card) 43'; Stuani 77' (pen.); Calavera (yellow card) 90+1'	Report	Martos (yellow card) 44'; Costas (yellow card) 75'; Ozornwafor (red card) 90+1'	Stadium: Estadi Montilivi; Attendance: 0 Referee: Óliver de la Fuente Ramos

13 July 2020 40	Almería	3–2	Rayo Vallecano	Almería
19:30 CEST	Lazo 9'; Núñez 20'; Muñoz 30'; Romera (yellow card) 69'; Francis (yellow card) 78'	Report	Advíncula (yellow card) 8'; Suárez (yellow card) 24'; Villar 51', 57', (yellow card) 81'	Stadium: Juegos Mediterráneos; Attendance: 0 Referee: Rubén Ávalos Barrera

17 July 2020 41	Ponferradina	2–1	Almería	Ponferrada
21:00 CEST	Valcarce (yellow card) 10'; Ivi 12', (yellow card) 77'; Larrea (yellow card) 38'; Yuri 64'	Report	Appiah (yellow card) 43'; Núñez 45+4'; Lazo (yellow card) 64'; Enzo (yellow card) 90+6'	Stadium: El Toralín; Attendance: 0 Referee: Miguel Ángel Ortiz Arias

20 July 2020 42	Almería	0–0	Málaga	Almería
21:00 CEST	Callejón (yellow card) 58'	Report	Cifu (yellow card) 53'; Casas (yellow card) 60'	Stadium: Juegos Mediterráneos; Attendance: 0 Referee: Saúl Ais Reig

==== Play-offs ====
13 August 2020 SF First leg	Girona	1–0	Almería	Girona
19:30 CEST (UTC+2)	Stuani 54'; Miquel (yellow card) 68'; Mojica (yellow card) 89'	Report	Costas (yellow card) 51'; Petrović (yellow card) 67'	Stadium: Estadi Montilivi; Attendance: 0 Referee: Javier Iglesias Villanueva

16 August 2020 SF Second leg	Almería	1–2 (1–3 agg.)	Girona	Almería
19:00 CEST (UTC+2)	Lazo 26'; Vada (yellow card) 33'	Report	Sáiz 4', (yellow card) 27'; García (yellow card) 33'; Jairo (yellow card) 40'; Gumbau (yellow card) 43'; Miquel (yellow card) 57'; Stuani 84'	Stadium: Juegos Mediterráneos; Attendance: 0 Referee: Dámaso Arcediano Monescillo

=== Copa del Rey ===
19 December 2019 First round	Tamaraceite	3–2 (a.e.t.)	Almería	Las Palmas
20:30	Tejera 77'; Delgado 82'; Padrón 105'	Report	Ozornwafor 25'; Maraš 90+1'	Stadium: Juan Guedes; Attendance: 800; Referee: Miguel Ángel Ortiz Arias
