= 2017–18 Real Betis season =

Real Betis
2017–18 season
- President: Ángel Haro
- Head coach: Quique Setién
- Stadium: Benito Villamarín
- La Liga: 6th
- Copa del Rey: Round of 32
- Top goalscorer: League: Sergio León (11); All: Sergio León (13)
- Highest home attendance: 53,533 vs Real Madrid (18 February 2018)
- Lowest home attendance: 31,311 vs Espanyol (17 March 2018)
- Average home league attendance: 45,467
Home colours	Away colours	Third colours

During the 2017–18 season, Real Betis participated in La Liga and the Copa del Rey.

== Squad ==
=== Current squad ===
As of 1 September 2017

Note: Flags indicate national team as defined under FIFA eligibility rules; some limited exceptions apply. Players may hold more than one non-FIFA nationality.

No.	Pos.	Nation	Player
1	GK	ESP	Dani Giménez
2	DF	ESP	Rafa Navarro
3	MF	ESP	Javi García
4	DF	MAR	Zouhair Feddal
5	DF	ESP	Jordi Amat (on loan from Swansea City)
6	MF	ESP	Fabián
7	FW	ESP	Sergio León
8	MF	ESP	Víctor Camarasa
9	FW	PAR	Antonio Sanabria
10	MF	ALG	Ryad Boudebouz
11	MF	ESP	Matías Nahuel (on loan from Villarreal)
12	FW	CRC	Joel Campbell (on loan from Arsenal)

No.	Pos.	Nation	Player
13	GK	ESP	Antonio Adán (2nd captain)
14	DF	DEN	Riza Durmisi
15	DF	ESP	Marc Bartra
17	MF	ESP	Joaquín (captain)
18	MF	MEX	Andrés Guardado
19	DF	ESP	Antonio Barragán (on loan from Middlesbrough)
20	FW	ESP	Cristian Tello
21	DF	ROU	Alin Toșca
23	DF	ALG	Aïssa Mandi
27	FW	ESP	Francis
29	MF	COL	Juanjo Narváez
32	DF	DOM	Junior Firpo

=== Transfers ===
- List of Spanish football transfers summer 2017#Real Betis

==== In ====
Date	Player	From	Type	Fee	Ref
14 August 2017	(Spain) Javi García	(Russia) Zenit Saint Petersburg	Transfer	€1,500,000	
30 June 2017	(Spain) Fabián	(Spain) Elche	Loan return	Free	
30 June 2017	(France) Didier Digard	(Spain) Osasuna	Loan return	Free	
30 June 2017	(Spain) Sergio León	(Spain) Osasuna	Transfer	€3,500,000	
1 July 2017	(Spain) Víctor Camarasa	(Spain) Levante	Transfer	€7,000,000	
1 July 2017	(Spain) Cristian Tello	(Spain) Barcelona	Transfer	€4,000,000	
6 July 2017	(Spain) Antonio Barragán	(England) Middlesbrough	Loan	Free	
7 July 2017	(Spain) Jordi Amat	(Wales) Swansea City	Loan	Free	
7 July 2017	(Mexico) Andrés Guardado	(Netherlands) PSV	Transfer	€2,300,000	
24 July 2017	(Morocco) Zouhair Feddal	(Spain) Alavés	Transfer	€2,500,000	
8 August 2017	(Algeria) Ryad Boudebouz	(France) Montpellier	Transfer	€7,000,000	
30 January 2018	(Spain) Marc Bartra	(Germany) Borussia Dortmund	Transfer	€8,000,000	

==== Out ====
Date	Player	To	Type	Fee	Ref
22 May 2017	(Italy) Cristiano Piccini	(Portugal) Sporting CP	Transfer	€3,000,000	
28 June 2017	(Spain) Álex Martínez	(Spain) Granada	Transfer	Free	
29 June 2017	(Brazil) Petros	(Brazil) São Paulo	Transfer	€2,500,000	
30 June 2017	(Netherlands) Ryan Donk	(Turkey) Galatasaray	Loan return	Free	
30 June 2017	(Spain) Rubén Pardo	(Spain) Real Sociedad	Loan return	Free	
1 July 2017	(Spain) Manu Herrera	TBD		Free	
1 July 2017	(Spain) Álex Alegría	(Spain) Levante	Loan	Free	
1 July 2017	(Spain) Francisco Portillo	(Spain) Getafe	Transfer	€1,500,000	
1 July 2017	(Spain) Dani Pacheco	(Spain) Getafe	Transfer	€1,000,000	
5 July 2017	(Spain) Bruno	(Spain) Getafe	Transfer	€600,000	
11 July 2017	(Spain) Rubén Castro	(China) Guizhou Zhicheng	Loan	Free	
14 July 2017	(Spain) Dani Ceballos	(Spain) Real Madrid	Transfer	€17,000,000	
24 July 2017	(Spain) Álvaro Cejudo	(Australia) Western Sydney Wanderers	Transfer	Free	
25 July 2017	(France) Jonas Martin	(France) Strasbourg	Transfer	€1,500,000	

== Competitions ==
=== Overall ===
Competition	Final position
La Liga	6th
Copa del Rey	Round of 32

=== La Liga ===
==== League table ====
Pos	Team	Pld	W	D	L	GF	GA	GD	Pts	Qualification or relegation
4	Valencia	38	22	7	9	65	38	+27	73	Qualification for the Champions League group stage
5	Villarreal	38	18	7	13	57	50	+7	61	Qualification for the Europa League group stage (Note: Since the winners of the 2017–18 Copa del Rey, Barcelona, qualified for European competition based on league position, the spot awarded to the cup winners (Europa League group stage) was passed to the sixth-placed team and the spot awarded to the sixth-placed team (Europa League second qualifying round) was passed to the seventh-placed team.)
6	Real Betis	38	18	6	14	60	61	−1	60	Qualification for the Europa League group stage
7	Sevilla	38	17	7	14	49	58	−9	58	Qualification for the Europa League second qualifying round
8	Getafe	38	15	10	13	42	33	+9	55	

Source: La Liga, Soccerway
Rules for classification: 1) Points; 2) Head-to-head points; 3) Head-to-head goal difference; 4) Goal difference; 5) Goals scored; 6) Fair-play points (Note: Head-to-head record is used only after all the matches between the teams in question have been played)

==== Matches ====
Win Draw Loss Fixtures

20 August 2017 1	Barcelona	2–0	Real Betis	Barcelona
20:15 CEST (UTC+02:00)	Toșca 36' (o.g.); Roberto 39'; Alba (yellow card) 52'; Digne (yellow card) 90+2'	Report	Matías Nahuel (yellow card) 63'	Stadium: Camp Nou; Attendance: 54,560; Referee: Daniel Trujillo Suárez

25 August 2017 2	Real Betis	2–1	Celta Vigo	Seville
22:00 CEST (UTC+02:00)	León 31'; Feddal (yellow card) 64', (goal) 77'; Mandi (yellow card) 84'	Report	M. Gómez 10'; Jozabed (yellow card) 68'; Radoja (yellow card) 90+5'	Stadium: Benito Villamarín; Attendance: 45,761; Referee: Ricardo de Burgos Bengoetxea

10 September 2017 3	Villarreal	3–1	Real Betis	Villarreal
20:45 CEST (UTC+02:00)	Costa (yellow card) 10'; Bacca 32'; Álvaro (yellow card) 45'; Castillejo 61'; Ünal 77'; Rukavina (yellow card) 90+2'	Report	León 11'	Stadium: La Cerámica; Attendance: 18,638; Referee: David Medié Jiménez

16 September 2017 4	Real Betis	2–1	Deportivo La Coruña	Seville
18:30 CEST (UTC+02:00)	Joaquín 14', 76'; Durmisi (yellow card) 49'; Adán (yellow card) 90+4'	Report	Cartabia 23'; Guilherme (yellow card) 27'; Navarro (yellow card) 59'; Luisinho (yellow card) 78'	Stadium: Benito Villamarín; Attendance: 46,174; Referee: Alberto Undiano Mallenco

20 September 2017 5	Real Madrid	0–1	Real Betis	Madrid
22:00 CEST (UTC+02:00)		Report	Tello (yellow card) 36'; Mandi (yellow card) 38'; Feddal (yellow card) 58'; Sanabria 90+4'	Stadium: Santiago Bernabéu; Attendance: 61,757; Referee: Antonio Mateu Lahoz

25 September 2017 6	Real Betis	4–0	Levante	Seville
21:00 CEST (UTC+02:00)	Sanabria 47', 90+3'; Mandi (yellow card) 51'; Fabián 55'; León 65'	Report		Stadium: Benito Villamarín; Attendance: 48,237; Referee: Pablo González Fuertes

1 October 2017 7	Real Sociedad	4–4	Real Betis	San Sebastián
12:00 CEST (UTC+02:00)	Willian José 13'; Oyarzabal 26'; Prieto 57'; Navas (yellow card) 66'; Illarramendi (yellow card) 66'; Llorente 86', (yellow card) 87'	Report	Sanabria 6'; Feddal 28'; Guardado (yellow card) 44'; Joaquín 46'; Adán (yellow card) 75'; León 84', (yellow card) 90+5'	Stadium: Anoeta; Attendance: 19,669; Referee: Alfonso Álvarez Izquierdo

15 October 2017 8	Real Betis	3–6	Valencia	Seville
20:45 CEST (UTC+02:00)	Feddal (yellow card) 45'; Campbell 79'; Sanabria 80'; Tello 84'	Report	Kondogbia 35'; Guedes 45'; Garay (yellow card) 46'; Vidal (yellow card) 52'; Murillo (yellow card) 59'; Rodrigo 64'; Pereira (yellow card) 87'; Zaza (yellow card) 90+3'	Stadium: Benito Villamarín; Attendance: 48,792; Referee: José María Sánchez Martínez

21 October 2017 9	Real Betis	2–0	Alavés	Seville
16:15 CEST (UTC+02:00)	Sanabria 13'; García (yellow card) 30'; Amat (yellow card) 74'; Alexis 75' (o.g.)	Report	Munir (yellow card) 39'; Wakaso (yellow card) 77'	Stadium: Benito Villamarín; Attendance: 49,304; Referee: Daniel Trujillo Suárez

30 October 2017 10	Espanyol	1–0	Real Betis	Cornellà de Llobregat
21:00 CEST (UTC+02:00)	Gerard 55'; V. Sánchez (yellow card) 69'; David López (yellow card) 72'	Report	Barragán (yellow card) 3'; Amat (yellow card) 51'; Matías Nahuel (yellow card) 76'; Joaquín (yellow card) 82'; Guardado (yellow card) 88'	Stadium: RCDE Stadium; Attendance: 17,545; Referee: Ignacio Iglesias Villanueva

3 November 2017 11	Real Betis	2–2	Getafe	Seville
21:00 CET (UTC+01:00)	García (yellow card) 18'; Amat (yellow card) 53'; Sanbria 68'; Boudebouz 87'	Report	Cala (yellow card) 12'; Bergara 18', (yellow card) 85'; Arambarri (yellow card) 32'; Antunes (yellow card) 33'; Portillo 34'; Djené (yellow card) 43'; Fajr (yellow card) 75'	Stadium: Benito Villamarín; Attendance: 39,631; Referee: Antonio Mateu Lahoz

20 November 2017 12	Eibar	5–0	Real Betis	Eibar
21:00 CET (UTC+01:00)	Amat 6' (o.g.); Escalante (yellow card) 22', (goal) 30'; Arbilla (yellow card) 37'; Charles 56' (pen.), 71'; Enrich 80'	Report	Amat (yellow card) 11'; Mandi (red card) 55'; Guardado (yellow card) 63'	Stadium: Ipurua; Attendance: 4,341; Referee: José González González

25 November 2017 13	Real Betis	2–2	Girona	Seville
18:30 CET (UTC+01:00)	Guardado 85'; Durmisi (yellow card) 86'; García (yellow card) 88'; Tello 90+5'	Report	Portu 45+1', 90+4'; Granell (yellow card) 84'	Stadium: Benito Villamarín; Attendance: 45,772; Referee: Carlos del Cerro Grande

3 December 2017 14	Las Palmas	1–0	Real Betis	Las Palmas
20:45 CET (UTC+01:00)	Calleri 19'; Lemos (yellow card) 33'	Report	Joaquín (yellow card) 32'; Camarasa (yellow card) 39'; Barragán (yellow card) 61'; Amat (yellow card) 63' (yellow-red card) 90+2'; Feddal (yellow card) 68'; Guardado (yellow card) 70'	Stadium: Gran Canaria; Attendance: 16,215; Referee: Xavier Estrada Fernández

10 December 2017 15	Real Betis	0–1	Atlético Madrid	Seville
16:15 CET (UTC+01:00)	Boudebouz (yellow card) 1'; Guardado (yellow card) 43'; Mandi (yellow card) 79'; León (yellow card) 90+6'	Report	Correa (yellow card) 14'; Saúl 29'; Godín (yellow card) 51'; Filipe Luís (yellow card) 59'	Stadium: Benito Villamarín; Attendance: 45,517; Referee: Alejandro Hernández Hernández

18 December 2017 16	Málaga	0–2	Real Betis	Málaga
21:00 CET (UTC+01:00)	Rosales (yellow card) 42'; Adrián (red card) 61'; Ontiveros (yellow card) 90+3'	Report	León 24'; Camarasa 50'; Barragán (yellow card) 71'; Joaquín (yellow card) 84'	Stadium: La Rosaleda; Attendance: 22,742; Referee: Javier Alberola Rojas

22 December 2017 17	Real Betis	0–2	Athletic Bilbao	Seville
19:30 CET (UTC+01:00)	Amat (red card) 34'; Joaquín (yellow card) 78'	Report	Núñez (yellow card) 15'; Saborit (yellow card) 17'; García 36' (pen.); Feddal 85' (o.g.)	Stadium: Benito Villamarín; Attendance: 42,713; Referee: Juan Martínez Munuera

7 January 2018 18	Sevilla	3–5	Real Betis	Seville
20:45 CET (UTC+01:00)	Ben Yedder 13'; Banega (yellow card) 25'; Kjær 39'; Lenglet 67', (yellow card) 80'; Escudero (yellow card) 73'	Report	Fabián 1'; Feddal 21', (yellow card) 66'; Francis (yellow card) 33'; Durmisi 63'; León 65', (yellow card) 80'; Mandi (yellow card) 68'; Tello (yellow card) 86', (goal) 90+5'; Adán (yellow card) 90'	Stadium: Ramón Sánchez Pizjuán; Attendance: 40,385; Referee: Jesús Gil Manzano

15 January 2018 19	Real Betis	3–2	Leganés	Seville
21:00 CET (UTC+01:00)	Tello 20'; Joaquín 40'; Boudebouz (yellow card) 54'; Castro 83' (pen.); Durmisi (yellow card) 90+1'	Report	Gumbau 44', (yellow card) 89'; Eraso 71', (yellow card) 82'; Cuéllar (yellow card) 83'	Stadium: Benito Villamarín; Attendance: 41,837; Referee: Ignacio Iglesias Villanueva

21 January 2018 20	Real Betis	0–5	Barcelona	Seville
20:45 CET (UTC+01:00)	Durmisi (yellow card) 51'; Feddal (yellow card) 67'	Report	Gomes (yellow card) 21'; Rakitić 59'; Messi 64', 80'; L. Suárez (yellow card) 67', (goal) 69', 89'	Stadium: Benito Villamarín; Attendance: 53,426; Referee: Santiago Jaime Latre

29 January 2018 21	Celta Vigo	3–2	Real Betis	Vigo
21:00 CET (UTC+01:00)	Aspas 12', 79'; Wass (yellow card) 46'; M. Gómez 57'	Report	García (yellow card) 15'; Joaquín (yellow card) 45'; Fabián (yellow card) 59'; Barragán (yellow card) 65'; Feddal (yellow card) 68'; León 71'; Guardado 90+1' (pen.)	Stadium: Balaídos; Attendance: 14,888; Referee: José María Sánchez Martínez

3 February 2018 22	Real Betis	2–1	Villarreal	Seville
16:15 CET (UTC+01:00)	Loren 45', 65'; Barragán (yellow card) 79'	Report	Bonera (red card) 31'; Rodri (yellow card) 40'; Mario (yellow card) 40'; Bacca 80' (pen.)	Stadium: Benito Villamarín; Attendance: 49,066; Referee: Javier Alberola Rojas

12 February 2018 23	Deportivo La Coruña	0–1	Real Betis	A Coruña
21:00 CET (UTC+01:00)	Bakkali (yellow card) 43'; Albentosa (yellow card) 65'	Report	Loren 54'	Stadium: Riazor; Attendance: 20,611; Referee: Carlos del Cerro Grande

18 February 2018 24	Real Betis	3–5	Real Madrid	Seville
20:45 CET (UTC+01:00)	Mandi 33'; Nacho 37' (o.g.); Barragán (yellow card) 44'; Junior (yellow card) 49'; Loren (yellow card) 61'; León 85'	Report	Carvajal (yellow card) 5'; Asensio 11', 59'; Kovačić (yellow card) 46'; Ramos 50', (yellow card) 55'; Bale (yellow card) 57'; Ronaldo 65'; Casemiro (yellow card) 81'; Benzema 90+2'	Stadium: Benito Villamarín; Attendance: 53,533; Referee: Jesús Gil Manzano

26 February 2018 25	Levante	0–2	Real Betis	Valencia
21:00 CET (UTC+01:00)	Sadiku (yellow card) 38'; Lerma (yellow card) 62'; Roger (yellow card) 76'; Chema (yellow card) 80'; Doukouré (yellow card) 83'	Report	Mandi (yellow card) 32'; Loren (yellow card) 52'; Chema 55' (o.g.); León 69'	Stadium: Ciutat de València; Attendance: 15,768; Referee: Ricardo de Burgos Bengoetxea

1 March 2018 26	Real Betis	0–0	Real Sociedad	Seville
19:30 CET (UTC+01:00)	León (yellow card) 35'; Bartra (yellow card) 56'	Report		Stadium: Benito Villamarín; Attendance: 40,435; Referee: José González González

4 March 2018 27	Valencia	2–0	Real Betis	Valencia
20:45 CET (UTC+01:00)	Rodrigo 23'; Montoya (yellow card) 45'; Zaza 47'	Report	Barragán (yellow card) 44'; Joaquín (yellow card) 79'; Fabián (yellow card) 79'; Bartra (yellow card) 82'	Stadium: Mestalla; Attendance: 35,565; Referee: Alejandro Hernández Hernández

12 March 2018 28	Alavés	1–3	Real Betis	Vitoria-Gasteiz
21:00 CET (UTC+01:00)	Ely (yellow card) 36'; Laguardia (yellow card) 50'; Sobrino 67'	Report	Loren 23', 78'; García 44'; Adán (yellow card) 50'	Stadium: Mendizorrotza; Attendance: 17,239; Referee: Carlos del Cerro Grande

17 March 2018 29	Real Betis	3–0	Espanyol	Seville
20:45 CET (UTC+01:00)	Firpo 34'; Boudebouz 56'; Francis 69', (yellow card) 81'	Report	Sánchez (yellow card) 36'; Darder (yellow card) 89'; Vilà (yellow card) 90+3'	Stadium: Benito Villamarín; Attendance: 31,311; Referee: Ricardo de Burgos Bengoetxea

2 April 2018 30	Getafe	0–1	Real Betis	Getafe
21:00 CEST (UTC+02:00)	Bruno (yellow card) 26'; Portillo (yellow card) 35'; Amath (yellow card) 45'; Molina (yellow card) 45'	Report	Bartra (yellow card) 72'; León 89'; Firpo (yellow card) 90+1'	Stadium: Coliseum Alfonso Pérez; Attendance: 10,466; Referee: Alberto Undiano Mallenco

7 April 2018 31	Real Betis	2–0	Eibar	Seville
18:30 CEST (UTC+02:00)	León 21'; Arbilla 50' (o.g.); Mandi (yellow card) 79'; Amat (yellow card) 90+2'	Report	García (yellow card) 56'; Orellana (yellow card) 69'	Stadium: Benito Villamarín; Attendance: 47,983; Referee: David Medié Jiménez

13 April 2018 32	Girona	0–1	Real Betis	Girona
21:00 CEST (UTC+02:00)	Ramalho (yellow card) 7'; Maffeo (yellow card) 14'; Muniesa (yellow card) 79'; Granell (yellow card) 86'; Portu (yellow card) 90+3'; Aday (yellow card) 90+3'; Juanpe (yellow card) 90+4'	Report	Loren 36', (yellow card) 58'; Bartra (yellow card) 42'; Guardado (yellow card) 48'; Mandi (yellow card) 49'; García (yellow card) 89'	Stadium: Montilivi; Attendance: 11,286; Referee: Santiago Jaime Latre

19 April 2018 33	Real Betis	1–0	Las Palmas	Seville
21:30 CEST (UTC+02:00)	León (yellow card) 65'; Mandi (yellow card) 77'; Firpo 90+4', (yellow card) 90+5'	Report	Calleri (yellow card) 32'; Gil (yellow card) 35'; Michel (yellow card) 68' (yellow-red card) 86'; Navarro (yellow card) 87'	Stadium: Benito Villamarín; Attendance: 45,210; Referee: José María Sánchez Martínez

22 April 2018 34	Atlético Madrid	0–0	Real Betis	Madrid
20:45 CEST (UTC+02:00)	Gabi (yellow card) 90+2'; Giménez (yellow card) 90+2'	Report	Fabián (yellow card) 27'; Firpo (yellow card) 62'; Bartra (yellow card) 88'; Amat (yellow card) 90+2'; Campbell (yellow card) 90+2'	Stadium: Wanda Metropolitano; Attendance: 54,522; Referee: Juan Martínez Munuera

30 April 2018 35	Real Betis	2–1	Málaga	Seville
21:00 CEST (UTC+02:00)	Durmisi 24'; Joaquín (yellow card) 62'; Fabián 73'	Report	Adrián (yellow card) 10'; En-Nesyri 20'; Hernández (yellow card) 75'; Miquel (yellow card) 80'; Samu (yellow card) 90+4'	Stadium: Benito Villamarín; Attendance: 53,061; Referee: Carlos del Cerro Grande

5 May 2018 36	Athletic Bilbao	2–0	Real Betis	Bilbao
16:15 CEST (UTC+02:00)	Muniain 76'; Aduriz 90+2'	Report	Bartra (yellow card) 28'; García (yellow card) 90+2'	Stadium: San Mamés; Attendance: 34,491; Referee: Javier Alberola Rojas

12 May 2018 37	Real Betis	2–2	Sevilla	Seville
18:30 CEST (UTC+02:00)	Bartra 5'; Guardado (yellow card) 17'; Loren 81'	Report	Sarabia (yellow card) 20'; Lenglet (yellow card) 24'; Ben Yedder 57'; Escudero (yellow card) 71'; Kjær 79'; Layún (yellow card) 90'	Stadium: Benito Villamarín; Attendance: 55,453; Referee: Alfonso Álvarez Izquierdo

19 May 2018 38	Leganés	3–2	Real Betis	Leganés
16:15 CEST (UTC+02:00)	Rico (yellow card) 23' (yellow-red card) 24'; Siovas 28'; Naranjo 64'; Amrabat 79'	Report	Campbell 20'; Sanabria 76'	Stadium: Butarque; Attendance: 9,426; Referee: Jesús Gil Manzano

=== Copa del Rey ===
==== Round of 32 ====
24 October 2017 First leg	Cádiz	1–2	Real Betis	Cádiz
21:30 CEST (UTC+02:00)	Álex 21'; Barral (yellow card) 45'; Traoré (yellow card) 65'; Garrido (yellow card) 74'	Report	León 6', 54'; Boudebouz (yellow card) 49'	Stadium: Ramón de Carraza; Attendance: 14,977; Referee: Javier Alberola Rojas

30 November 2017 Second leg	Real Betis	3–5 (5–6 agg.)	Cádiz	Seville
21:30 CET (UTC+01:00)	Boudebouz 8', (yellow card) 44'; Tello 24', 64'; Narváez (yellow card) 70'; Camarasa (yellow card) 88'	Report	Barral 3'; Romera 18', 41'; García 26' (pen.); Traoré (yellow card) 28'; Kecojević 78'	Stadium: Benito Villamarín; Attendance: 25,829; Referee: Daniel Trujillo Suárez

== Statistics ==
=== Appearances and goals ===
Last updated on 20 May 2018.

No.	Pos	Nat	Player	Total		La Liga		Copa del Rey	
No.	Pos	Nat	Player	Apps	Goals	Apps	Goals	Apps	Goals
Goalkeepers
1	GK	(Spain) ESP	Dani Giménez	6	0	4	0	2	0
13	GK	(Spain) ESP	Antonio Adán	30	0	30	0	0	0
31	GK	(Spain) ESP	Pedro López	5	0	5	0	0	0
Defenders
2	DF	(Spain) ESP	Rafa Navarro	5	0	1+2	0	2	0
4	DF	(Morocco) MAR	Zouhair Feddal	15	3	14+1	3	0	0
5	DF	(Spain) ESP	Jordi Amat	26	0	24+1	0	1	0
14	DF	(Denmark) DEN	Riza Durmisi	25	2	23+1	2	1	0
15	DF	(Spain) ESP	Marc Bartra	16	1	16	1	0	0
19	DF	(Spain) ESP	Antonio Barragán	31	0	28+1	0	0+2	0
23	DF	(Algeria) ALG	Aïssa Mandi	35	1	34	1	1	0
32	DF	(Dominican Republic) DOM	Junior Firpo	14	2	14	2	0	0
Midfielders
3	MF	(Spain) ESP	Javi García	33	1	27+5	1	1	0
6	MF	(Spain) ESP	Fabián	35	3	30+4	3	1	0
8	MF	(Spain) ESP	Víctor Camarasa	26	1	14+10	1	1+1	0
10	MF	(Algeria) ALG	Ryad Boudebouz	29	3	15+12	2	2	1
17	MF	(Spain) ESP	Joaquín	36	4	29+6	4	0+1	0
18	MF	(Mexico) MEX	Andrés Guardado	30	2	25+4	2	0+1	0
35	MF	(Spain) ESP	Julio Gracia	2	0	0+2	0	0	0
Forwards
7	FW	(Spain) ESP	Sergio León	33	13	23+8	11	2	2
9	FW	(Paraguay) PAR	Antonio Sanabria	17	8	8+9	8	0	0
12	FW	(Costa Rica) CRC	Joel Campbell	9	2	2+6	2	0+1	0
16	FW	(Spain) ESP	Loren	15	7	12+3	7	0	0
20	FW	(Spain) ESP	Cristian Tello	33	6	16+16	4	1	2
24	FW	(Spain) ESP	Rubén Castro	10	1	3+7	1	0	0
27	FW	(Spain) ESP	Francis	14	1	10+4	1	0	0
Players who have made an appearance or had a squad number this season but have left the club either permanently or on loan
11	MF	(Spain) ESP	Matías Nahuel	9	0	3+4	0	2	0
12	FW	(Ukraine) UKR	Roman Zozulya	0	0	0	0	0	0
15	MF	(France) FRA	Didier Digard	0	0	0	0	0	0
21	DF	(Romania) ROU	Alin Toșca	8	0	5+1	0	2	0
22	MF	(Serbia) SRB	Darko Brašanac	0	0	0	0	0	0
29	FW	(Colombia) COL	Juanjo Narváez	9	0	4+3	0	2	0
33	DF	(Spain) ESP	Redru	1	0	0	0	1	0
34	FW	(Spain) ESP	Aitor Ruibal	2	0	0+2	0	0	0

=== Cards ===
Accounts for all competitions. Last updated on 19 December 2017.

No.	Pos.	Name	Yellow card	Red card
3	MF	(Spain) Javi García	3	0
4	DF	(Morocco) Zouhair Feddal	4	0
5	DF	(Spain) Jordi Amat	5	1
7	FW	(Spain) Sergio León	2	0
8	MF	(Spain) Víctor Camarasa	2	0
10	MF	(Algeria) Ryad Boudebouz	3	0
11	MF	(Spain) Matías Nahuel	2	0
13	GK	(Spain) Antonio Adán	2	0
14	DF	(Denmark) Riza Durmisi	2	0
17	MF	(Spain) Joaquín	3	0
18	MF	(Mexico) Andrés Guardado	5	0
19	DF	(Spain) Antonio Barragán	3	0
20	FW	(Spain) Cristian Tello	1	0
23	DF	(Algeria) Aïssa Mandi	4	0
29	FW	(Colombia) Juanjo Narváez	1	0

=== Clean sheets ===
Last updated on 19 December 2017.

Number	Nation	Name	Matches Played	La Liga	Copa del Rey	Total
1	(Spain)	Dani Giménez	2	0	0	0
13	(Spain)	Antonio Adán	16	4	0	4
TOTALS				4	0	4
