= Jordi Amat (footballer) =

Indonesian footballer (born 1992)

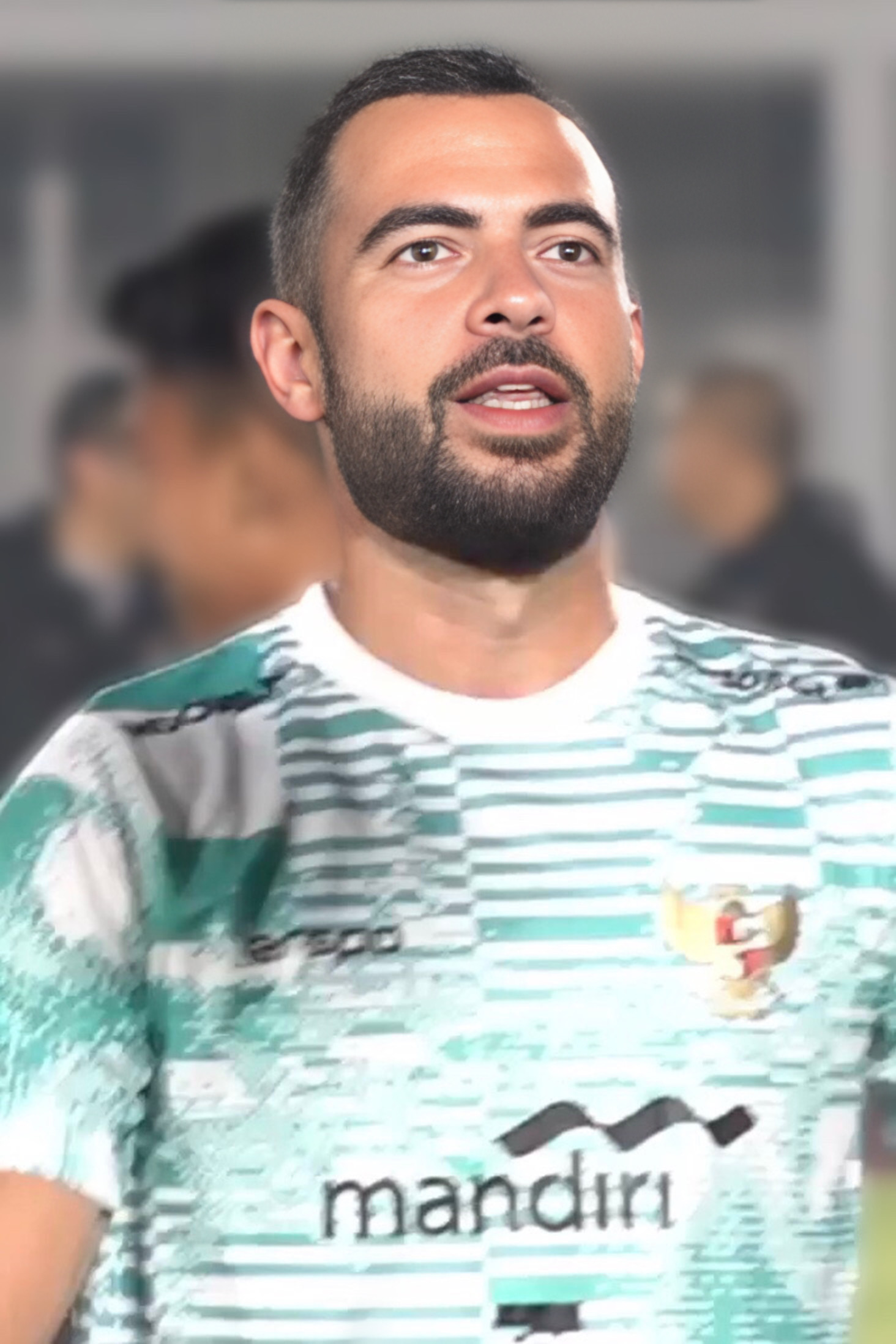
- Amat training with Indonesia in 2024

Personal information
- Full name: Jordi Amat Maas
- Date of birth: 21 March 1992 (age 34)
- Place of birth: Canet de Mar, Spain
- Height: 1.84 m (6 ft 0 in)
- Position: Centre-back

Team information
- Current team: Persija Jakarta
- Number: 21

Youth career
- 1998–1999: Canet de Mar
- 1999–2009: Espanyol

Senior career*
Years	Team	Apps	(Gls)
2009–2010	Espanyol B	17	(0)
2010–2013	Espanyol	41	(0)
2012–2013	→ Rayo Vallecano (loan)	27	(1)
2013–2018	Swansea City	52	(0)
2017–2018	→ Betis (loan)	25	(0)
2018–2020	Rayo Vallecano	31	(0)
2019–2020	→ Eupen (loan)	24	(2)
2020–2022	Eupen	56	(0)
2022–2025	Johor Darul Ta'zim	38	(2)
2025–	Persija Jakarta	31	(3)

International career^{‡}
2008	Spain U16	2	(0)
2008–2009	Spain U17	11	(1)
2010	Spain U18	2	(0)
2010–2011	Spain U19	7	(0)
2011	Spain U20	5	(0)
2011–2014	Spain U21	15	(0)
2011–2013	Catalonia	2	(0)
2022–	Indonesia	25	(2)
Medal record
Men's Football
Representing Spain
FIFA U-17 World Cup
Third place	2009 Nigeria	Team
Representing Indonesia
FIFA ASEAN Cup
Winner	2026 Indonesia	Team
FIFA Series
Runner-up	2026 Indonesia
- * Club domestic league appearances and goals as of 8 November 2026 ‡ National team caps and goals as of 3 August 2026

Jordi Amat Maas (Catalan: [ˈʒɔɾði əˈmat], Spanish: [ˈɟʝoɾðj aˈmat]; born 21 March 1992) is a professional footballer who plays as a centre-back for Super League club Persija Jakarta. Born in Spain, he plays for the Indonesia national team.

He spent the majority of his career with Espanyol and Swansea City, also representing Rayo Vallecano (two spells) and Betis in La Liga as well as Belgian Pro League club Eupen, before joining Johor Darul Ta'zim in June 2022.

Amat played for Spain at youth level and Indonesia as a senior, making his debut for the latter in 2022. He was a member of the squad that appeared at the 2023 AFC Asian Cup.

== Club career ==
=== Espanyol ===
Born in Canet de Mar, Barcelona, Catalonia, Amat joined Espanyol's youth system at the age of 7. He began appearing as a senior with the B team, in the Segunda División B.

On 24 January 2010, two months shy of his 18th birthday, Amat played his first La Liga match with the club, coming on as a late substitute in a 1–1 home draw against Mallorca. He finished his first full season with 26 appearances (28 in all competitions), helping the Pericos to a final eighth position.

Amat was loaned to fellow top-tier Rayo Vallecano for 2012–13, being first choice during the campaign. He scored his first goal for the Madrid outskirts side on 24 February 2013, netting from 50 metres in an eventual 1–2 home loss to Real Valladolid and also putting one in his own net in the same match.

=== Swansea City ===
On 27 June 2013, Premier League club Swansea City announced Amat had been signed for a transfer fee of £2.5 million on a four-year deal; it was subject to international clearance and a medical. He made his official debut on 1 August, playing the full 90 minutes in a 4–0 home victory over Malmö in the first leg of the third qualifying round of the UEFA Europa League.

Amat agreed to a one-year contract extension on 11 March 2015, keeping him at the Liberty Stadium until 2018. On 7 July 2017, he was loaned to Real Betis for one season.

=== Return to Rayo Vallecano ===
On 9 August 2018, Amat returned to both Rayo Vallecano and the Spanish top flight, signing for an undisclosed fee. He played his first match in his second spell ten days later, featuring the entire 1–4 home defeat against Sevilla.

On 1 August 2019, after Rayo's relegation, Amat joined Eupen of the Belgian Pro League on a one-year loan, with an obligation to buy at the end of the season.

=== Johor Darul Ta'zim ===
On 29 June 2022, Amat joined Johor Darul Ta'zim of the Malaysia Super League. He made his debut on 19 August, in a 5–0 loss to Urawa Red Diamonds in the round of 16 of the AFC Champions League.

Amat played the full 90 minutes in three of Johor's 2022 Malaysia Cup matches, a 2–0 win against Petaling Jaya City in the round of 16's second leg, the 5–0 victory over Kelantan in the quarter-finals as well as the decisive match, a 3–1 defeat of Sabah. On 2 February 2023, he captained his team for the first time, in a friendly against Russian Premier League club Lokomotiv Moscow. His league bow took place later that month, in a 2–0 victory over Terengganu where he also acted as captain.

=== Persija Jakarta ===
On 5 July 2025, aged 33, Amat signed for Liga 1 club Persija Jakarta.

== International career ==
=== Spain ===
Amat made his competitive debut for the Spanish under-17s in 2009. He also represented the nation at under-18, under-19, under-20 and under-21 levels.

=== Indonesia ===
In May 2022, it was announced that Amat had decided to represent the Indonesia national team. On 22 November, he was called up for a training camp in preparation for the 2022 AFF Championship. Selected for the final squad, he won his first cap on 23 December in a 2–1 win over Cambodia in the group stage; as his side operated in a 4–3–3 formation, he was their only player to be included in the tournament's All-Star XI, playing four complete matches and missing one due to yellow cards.

Amat scored his first goal for Indonesia on 28 March 2023, a last-minute effort in a friendly against Burundi to equalise 2–2. He captained the nation at the 2023 AFC Asian Cup, helping it reach the knockout stages of the tournament for the first time ever.

== Personal life ==
Amat is of Dutch descent through his maternal grandfather. He also has Indonesian ancestry through his maternal grandmother, born in Makassar, and is a descendant of the 14th and 17th Kings of Siau in Sitaro Islands, Jacob Ponto (1850–1889) and Manalang Doelag Kansil (1895–1908), respectively. He was officially welcomed as part of the Nusantara Sultanate Royal Council on 1 July 2022, being awarded the title of Pangeran (prince).

On 17 November 2022, Amat officially obtained Indonesian citizenship.

== Career statistics ==
=== Club ===
As of match played 22 April 2026

Appearances and goals by club, season and competition
Club	Season	League			National cup (Note: Includes Copa del Rey, FA Cup, Belgian Cup, Malaysia FA Cup)		League cup (Note: Includes EFL Cup, Malaysia Cup)		Continental		Total	
Club	Season	Division	Apps	Goals	Apps	Goals	Apps	Goals	Apps	Goals	Apps	Goals
Espanyol	2009–10	La Liga	6	0	0	0	—		—		6	0
Espanyol	2010–11	La Liga	26	0	2	0	—		—		28	0
Espanyol	2011–12	La Liga	9	0	4	0	—		—		13	0
Espanyol	Total		41	0	6	0	—		—		47	0
Rayo Vallecano (loan)	2012–13	La Liga	27	1	0	0	—		—		27	1
Swansea City	2013–14	Premier League	17	0	3	0	1	0	9 (Note: Appearances in UEFA Europa League)	0	30	0
Swansea City	2014–15	Premier League	10	0	2	0	0	0	—		12	0
Swansea City	2015–16	Premier League	8	0	1	0	2	0	—		11	0
Swansea City	2016–17	Premier League	17	0	0	0	2	0	—		20	0
Swansea City	Total		52	0	6	0	5	0	9	0	73	0
Betis (loan)	2017–18	La Liga	25	0	1	0	—		—		26	0
Rayo Vallecano	2018–19	La Liga	31	0	0	0	—		—		31	0
Eupen (loan)	2019–20	Belgian Pro League	24	2	1	0	—		—		25	2
Eupen	2020–21	Belgian Pro League	29	0	3	0	—		—		32	0
Eupen	2021–22	Belgian Pro League	27	0	2	0	—		—		29	0
Eupen	Total		80	2	6	0	—		—		86	2
Johor Darul Ta'zim	2022	Malaysia Super League	0	0	0	0	3	0	1 (Note: Appearances in AFC Champions League)	0	4	0
Johor Darul Ta'zim	2023	Malaysia Super League	23	0	4	1	2	1	6	0	35	2
Johor Darul Ta'zim	2024–25	Malaysia Super League	15	2	3	0	2	0	4 (Note: Appearances in AFC Champions League Elite)	0	24	2
Johor Darul Ta'zim	Total		38	2	7	1	7	1	11	0	63	4
Persija Jakarta	2025–26	Super League	25	3	—		—		—		25	3
Career total			319	8	26	1	12	1	20	0	377	10

=== International ===
As of match played 3 August 2026

Indonesia
Year	Apps	Goals
2022	2	0
2023	8	1
2024	11	0
2025	1	1
2026	3	0
Total	25	2

As of match played 5 September 2025
Scores and results list Indonesia's goal tally first, score column indicates score after each Amat goal.

List of international goals scored by Jordi Amat
No.	Date	Venue	Cap	Opponent	Score	Result	Competition
1	28 March 2023	Patriot Candrabhaga Stadium, Bekasi, Indonesia	6	Burundi	2–2	2–2	Friendly
2	5 September 2025	Gelora Bung Tomo Stadium, Surabaya, Indonesia	22	Chinese Taipei	1–0	6–0	Friendly

== Honours ==
Johor Darul Ta'zim

- Malaysia Super League: 2023, 2024–25
- Malaysia FA Cup: 2022, 2023
- Malaysia Cup: 2022, 2023
- Piala Sumbangsih: 2023

Spain U17

- FIFA U-17 World Cup third place: 2009

Indonesia

- FIFA ASEAN Cup: 2026

Individual

- AFF Championship Best XI: 2022
- FAM Football Awards: Team of the Season 2023

== See also ==
- List of Indonesia international footballers born outside Indonesia
