= Francis Guerrero =

Spanish footballer

Personal information
- Full name: Francisco Javier Guerrero Martín
- Date of birth: 11 March 1996 (age 30)
- Place of birth: Coín, Spain
- Height: 1.75 m (5 ft 9 in)
- Positions: Right back; winger

Youth career
- Puerto Malagueño
- 2014–2015: Betis

Senior career*
Years	Team	Apps	(Gls)
2015–2017	Betis B	38	(1)
2017–2020	Betis	36	(1)
2020	→ Almería (loan)	7	(0)
2022–2023	Rayo Majadahonda	4	(0)

International career
2018	Spain U21	1	(0)
- * Club domestic league appearances and goals as of 20 July 2020

Francisco Javier Guerrero Martín (born 11 March 1996), commonly known as Francis, is a Spanish professional footballer who plays either as a right back or a right winger.

== Club career ==
Born in Coín, Province of Málaga, Andalusia, Francis joined Real Betis' youth setup in 2014 from Puerto Malagueño CF. He made his senior debut with the B team on 19 April 2015, coming on as a first-half substitute for Nacho Abeledo in a 0–0 Segunda División B away draw against Real Balompédica Linense.

Francis scored his first senior goal on 21 February 2016, his team's only in a 1–3 loss at Real Jaén. On 15 March of the following year, he renewed his contract with the club.

Francis made his first-team – and La Liga – debut on 20 August 2017, replacing Matías Nahuel in a 0–2 away defeat against FC Barcelona. Converted to a right back by manager Quique Setién, he scored his first professional goal the following 17 March by netting the last in a 3–0 home win over RCD Espanyol.

On 31 January 2020, having only featured in one Copa del Rey match during the season, Francis was loaned to Segunda División side UD Almería until June. In October, he was released by Betis.

== Club statistics ==
As of match played 20 July 2020

Club	Season	League			National Cup		Europe		Other		Total	
Club	Season	Division	Apps	Goals	Apps	Goals	Apps	Goals	Apps	Goals	Apps	Goals
Betis B	2014–15	Segunda División B	5	0	—		—		—		5	0
Betis B	2015–16	Segunda División B	29	1	—		—		—		29	1
Betis B	2016–17	Segunda División B	4	0	—		—		—		4	0
Betis B	Total		38	1	—		—		—		38	1
Betis	2017–18	La Liga	14	1	0	0	—		—		14	1
Betis	2018–19	La Liga	22	0	5	0	1 (Note: Appearances in UEFA Europa League)	0	—		28	0
Betis	2019–20	La Liga	0	0	1	0	—		—		1	0
Betis	Total		36	1	6	0	1	0	0	0	43	0
Almería (loan)	2019–20	Segunda División	7	0	0	0	—		—		7	0
Rayo Majadahonda	2022–23	Primera Federación	4	0	0	0	—		—		4	0
Career total			85	2	6	0	1	0	0	0	92	2
