= Jonathan (footballer, born 1998) =

Brazilian footballer

Personal information
- Full name: Jonathan Silva Vieira
- Date of birth: 3 March 1998 (age 28)
- Place of birth: Japeri, Brazil
- Height: 1.72 m (5 ft 8 in)
- Position: Left back

Team information
- Current team: Ituano

Youth career
- 2010–2018: Nova Iguaçu
- 2016: → Internacional (loan)
- 2017–2018: → Botafogo (loan)

Senior career*
Years	Team	Apps	(Gls)
2016	Nova Iguaçu	3	(0)
2019	Botafogo	12	(2)
2019–2022	Almería	22	(0)
2020–2021	→ Las Palmas (loan)	12	(0)
2021–2022	→ Botafogo (loan)	17	(0)
2023–	Ituano	2	(0)
- * Club domestic league appearances and goals as of 10 April 2022

Jonathan Silva Vieira (born 3 March 1998), simply known as Jonathan, is a Brazilian footballer who plays as a left back for Ituano.

== Club career ==
Born in Japeri, Rio de Janeiro, Jonathan joined Botafogo in August 2017, after already making his senior debut at Nova Iguaçu the previous year. Initially on loan, he was bought outright and renewed his contract until 2021 in December 2018.

Promoted to the first team for the 2019 season, Jonathan made his senior debut on 26 January 2019, starting in a 2–1 Campeonato Carioca home loss against Flamengo. He scored his first goal on 3 February, netting the third in a 3–0 away defeat of Boavista.

Jonathan made his Série A debut on 27 April 2019, playing the full 90 minutes in a 2–0 loss at São Paulo. However, he spent the year as a backup to Gilson.

On 20 August 2019, Jonathan signed a five-year contract with Segunda División side UD Almería, for a rumoured fee of €1 million. On 21 September of the following year, he moved to fellow league team UD Las Palmas on loan for one year.

On 31 July 2021, Jonathan returned to his former side Botafogo on loan.

== Honours ==
Botafogo

- Campeonato Brasileiro Série B: 2021
