= José Carlos Lazo =

Spanish footballer (born 1996)

Personal information
- Full name: José Carlos Lazo Romero
- Date of birth: 16 February 1996 (age 30)
- Place of birth: Sanlúcar de Barrameda, Spain
- Height: 1.80 m (5 ft 11 in)
- Position: Winger

Youth career
- 2002–2012: Sanluqueño
- 2012–2015: Real Madrid

Senior career*
Years	Team	Apps	(Gls)
2015–2018	Real Madrid B	20	(1)
2016–2017	→ Villarreal B (loan)	26	(1)
2017–2018	→ Recreativo (loan)	37	(6)
2018–2020	Getafe	0	(0)
2018–2019	→ Lugo (loan)	35	(8)
2019–2020	→ Almería (loan)	27	(8)
2020–2022	Almería	77	(10)
2022–2024	Espanyol	25	(2)
2024–2026	Albacete	52	(4)
- * Club domestic league appearances and goals as of 31 May 2026

José Carlos Lazo Romero (born 16 February 1996) is a Spanish professional footballer who plays as a left winger.

== Club career ==
Born in Sanlúcar de Barrameda, Cádiz, Andalusia, Lazo joined Real Madrid's youth setup in 2002, from Atlético Sanluqueño CF. Promoted to the reserves in Segunda División B by manager Zinedine Zidane on 5 July 2015, he made his senior debut on 22 August by coming on as a second-half substitute for Enzo Zidane in a 5–1 home routing of CD Ebro.

Lazo scored his first senior goal on 16 January 2016, netting the last in a 4–0 thrashing of CF Rayo Majadahonda. On 1 September, he was loaned to Villarreal CF for one year, and was assigned to the B-side also in the third division.

On 27 July 2017, Lazo joined fellow third tier side Recreativo de Huelva, also in a temporary deal. On 13 July of the following year, he signed a permanent contract with La Liga side Getafe CF, but was loaned to CD Lugo in Segunda División on 6 August.

Lazo made his professional debut on 26 August 2018, replacing Iriome and scoring the equalizer in a 1–1 away draw against Granada CF. The following 20 August, he joined UD Almería still in the second division, also in a temporary deal.

On 8 May 2020, Lazo agreed to a permanent four-year-contract with the Rojiblancos. He achieved promotion to the first division in 2022 as champions, and made his debut in the category at the age of 26 on 14 August 2022, replacing Largie Ramazani in a 2–1 home loss against Real Madrid.

On 24 August 2022, Lazo signed a five-year contract with RCD Espanyol in the top tier. On 12 August 2024, after one relegation and one promotion where he was a backup option, he terminated his link with the club, and signed a two-year deal with Albacete Balompié eight days later.

== Honours ==
Almería

- Segunda División: 2021–22
