= Juanjo Narváez =

Colombian footballer (born 1995)

Personal information
- Full name: Juan José Narváez Solarte
- Date of birth: 12 February 1995 (age 31)
- Place of birth: Pasto, Colombia
- Height: 1.80 m (5 ft 11 in)
- Position: Attacking midfielder

Team information
- Current team: Cong An Ho Chi Minh City
- Number: 8

Youth career
- 2002–2011: Deportivo Pasto
- 2012–2014: Real Madrid

Senior career*
Years	Team	Apps	(Gls)
2011–2012	Deportivo Pasto	8	(1)
2013–2015	Real Madrid C	27	(7)
2013–2016	Real Madrid B	29	(4)
2016–2017	Betis B	50	(9)
2017–2020	Betis	7	(0)
2018	→ Córdoba (loan)	16	(5)
2018–2019	→ Almería (loan)	30	(2)
2019–2020	→ Las Palmas (loan)	29	(7)
2020–2022	Zaragoza	79	(11)
2022–2023	Valladolid	5	(1)
2023	→ Leganés (loan)	12	(0)
2023–2024	Cartagena	32	(2)
2024–2025	Al-Jabalain	29	(0)
2025–2026	Al-Raed	30	(1)
2026–	Cong An Ho Chi Minh City	1	(0)
- * Club domestic league appearances and goals as of 5 September 2026

Juan José "Juanjo" Narváez Solarte (born 12 February 1995) is a Colombian professional footballer who plays for V.League 1 club Cong An Ho Chi Minh City. Mainly an attacking midfielder, he can also play as a forward.

== Club career ==
=== Deportivo Pasto ===
Born in Pasto, Nariño Department, and a product of hometown team Deportivo Pasto's youth ranks, Narváez spent his first two seasons as a senior with Deportivo Pasto, scoring four goals; three in the Copa Colombia and another in the Categoría Primera B. He debuted for them in the Categoría Primera B on 9 March 2011 at 16 years and 25 days of age, making him the club's youngest ever player, and in the Categoría Primera A on 28 April 2012.

=== Real Madrid ===
In November 2012, Narváez joined the youth academy of Real Madrid. He was highly recommended by Real Madrid legend Zinedine Zidane to take into their youth system and was viewed as 'the next Falcao' due to his goalscoring abilities. Narváez made his debut for the club in the 2013 Copa del Rey Juvenil, where he scored two goals in three appearances as the team won the trophy, although he did not play in the final. He made his first team debut on 28 January 2012, playing the whole game in a 3–0 win over Zamalek SC in the Alkass International Cup. Narváez scored another goal against Rayo Vallecano in a 2–0 victory a week later. During the international break in October, Narvaez scored his first hat-trick for the club in a 6–1 win against Don Bosco.

"He's a kid that's grown up in such little time. In the campaigns with the lower squads, he's doing great. But realistically, the competition isn't as high as the UEFA Youth League, where the quality around players his age is high. While he plays mostly with our reserve squads, he's improving in the process and contributing in more ways than one as we try to take advantage at certain times."

— Alberto Toril after Narvaez's debut for Real Madrid Castilla.

Narváez made his UEFA Youth League debut against Galatasaray, as he managed to score the tying goal in a 1–1 draw. As of September 2013, he had scored six goals in three appearances for the U-17 squad. In a UEFA Youth League match against Juventus, Narváez scored four goals, one with a penalty, and also assisted the fourth goal in a 6–2 victory. This made him joint top scorer at the time with five goals.

In his third match representing the C team, Narváez scored his first goal against Fuenlabrada, in the 82nd minute. Narváez was once again promoted, this time to Real Madrid Castilla, where he came off the bench in the 88th minute. Narvaez would then score his first goal against Leioa in his 5th appearance.

=== Betis ===
At the start of the year 2016, Narváez signed for Real Betis on a three-year deal, being initially assigned to the B-team. On 29 January 2018, Narváez he was loaned to Segunda División side Córdoba CF, where he helped to avoid relegation in the last game of the season by winning 3–0 to Sporting Gijón.

On 31 August 2018, Narváez joined Almería on a one-season loan. Upon returning, he was initially assigned to Betis' first team in La Liga, but moved to Las Palmas still in the second division on loan for one year on 31 August 2019.

=== Zaragoza ===
On 4 September 2020, Narváez agreed to a three-year contract with second division side Real Zaragoza. An undisputed starter, he scored nine goals in his first season.

=== Valladolid ===
On 1 September 2022, Narváez signed a two-year contract with Real Valladolid in the top tier. The following 30 January, after being rarely used, he returned to the second division after being loaned to CD Leganés until the end of the season.

On 23 August 2023, Narváez terminated his contract with the Pucelanos.

=== Cartagena ===
On 23 August 2023, just hours after leaving Valladolid, Narváez signed a two-year contract with FC Cartagena in the second division. On 9 August of the following year, he terminated his link with the club.

=== Saudi Arabia ===
On 31 August 2024, Narváez joined Saudi First Division League club Al-Jabalain.

On 5 September 2025, Narváez joined Al-Raed.

=== Cong An Ho Chi Minh City ===
On 13 August 2026, Narváez moved to Vietnam, signing for V.League 1 side Cong An Ho Chi Minh City.

== International career ==
Narváez was repeatedly called up to participate in Colombia's U20 squad, but Real Madrid refused to release him; he was not allowed to take part in the 2015 FIFA U-20 World Cup.

== Career statistics ==
As of mtatch played 29 April 2023

Club	Season	League			Cup		Continental		Total	
Club	Season	Division	Apps	Goals	Apps	Goals	Apps	Goals	Apps	Goals
Deportivo Pasto	2011	Categoría Primera B	6	1	7	1	–		13	2
Deportivo Pasto	2012	Categoría Primera A	2	0	8	2	–		10	2
Deportivo Pasto	Total		8	1	15	3	0	0	23	4
Real Madrid C	2013–14	Segunda División B	4	1	–		–		4	1
Real Madrid C	2014–15	Tercera Federación	23	6	–		–		23	6
Real Madrid C	Total		27	7	0	0	0	0	27	7
Real Madrid B	2013–14	Segunda División	4	0	–		–		4	0
Real Madrid B	2014–15	Segunda División B	11	3	–		–		11	3
Real Madrid B	2015–16	Segunda División B	14	1	–		–		14	1
Real Madrid B	Total		29	4	0	0	0	0	29	4
Real Betis B	2015–16	Segunda División B	15	1	–		–		15	1
Real Betis	2016–17	La Liga	7	0	2	0	–		9	0
Real Betis	2017–18	La Liga	7	0	0	0	–		7	0
Real Betis	Total		14	0	2	0	–		16	0
Córdoba	2017–18	Segunda División	16	5	0	0	–		16	5
Almería	2018–19	Segunda División	30	2	3	0	–		33	2
Las Palmas	2019–20	Segunda División	29	7	0	0	–		29	7
Real Zaragoza	2020–21	Segunda División	42	9	0	0	–		42	9
Real Zaragoza	2021–22	Segunda División	34	2	2	0	–		36	2
Real Zaragoza	2022–23	Segunda División	3	0	0	0	–		3	0
Real Zaragoza	Total		79	11	2	0	–		79	11
Real Valladolid	2022–23	La Liga	5	0	1	0	–		6	0
Elche (loan)	2022–23	La Liga	11	0	0	0	–		11	0
Career total			263	38	23	3	0	0	286	43

== Honors ==
Deportivo Pasto

- Categoría Primera B: 2011

Real Madrid Youth

- Copa del Rey Juvenil de Fútbol: 2013

== Personal life ==
Since arriving at Real Madrid's academy, he became close friends with Enzo Fernández, the son of Zinedine Zidane.
