= Rubén Enri =

Spanish footballer (born 1998)

Personal information
- Full name: Rubén Enri García
- Date of birth: 10 April 1998 (age 28)
- Place of birth: Barcelona, Spain
- Height: 1.74 m (5 ft 9 in)
- Position: Forward

Team information
- Current team: Olot
- Number: 10

Youth career
- Vilassar Mar
- Cornellà
- 2013–2015: Espanyol
- 2015–2016: Damm
- 2016–2017: Espanyol

Senior career*
Years	Team	Apps	(Gls)
2017–2018	Espanyol B	1	(0)
2017–2018	→ Badalona (loan)	19	(1)
2018–2019	Reus B	28	(11)
2018	Reus	10	(1)
2019–2020	Almería B	25	(24)
2019–2021	Almería	1	(0)
2020–2021	→ Andorra (loan)	10	(1)
2021–2023	Andorra	25	(3)
2022–2023	→ Cornellà (loan)	30	(6)
2023–2024	Rayo Majadahonda	31	(4)
2024–2025	San Fernando	15	(0)
2025–	Olot	46	(15)
- * Club domestic league appearances and goals as of 15 May 2026

Rubén Enri García (born 10 April 1998) is a Spanish footballer who plays as a forward for Segunda Federación club Olot.

== Club career ==
Born in Barcelona, Catalonia, Enri was a RCD Espanyol youth graduate. He made his senior debut with the reserves on 2 April 2017, coming on as a second-half substitute for Mickaël Latour in a 0–3 Segunda División B away loss against CD Alcoyano.

On 6 July 2017, Enri renewed his contract until 2020 and was immediately loaned to CF Badalona for a year. Roughly one year later he joined another reserve team, CF Reus Deportiu B of the Tercera División.

Enri made his professional debut with the main squad on 25 August 2018, replacing Álex Carbonell in a 0–0 home draw against Real Zaragoza in the Segunda División. He scored his first professional goal on 9 September, but in a 1–2 home loss against Albacete Balompié.

Enri continued to appear exclusively with the B-side after Reus' ejection from the Liga de Fútbol Profesional. On 9 July 2019, he signed for another reserve team, UD Almería B in the fourth division.

On 27 October 2019, Enri scored a hat-trick in a 3–2 away win against Vélez CF. On 24 November, he scored four times in a 6–0 home routing of Atlético Porcuna CF, taking his tally up to 18 goals in only 14 matches.

Enri made his first-team debut for the Rojiblancos on 22 December 2019, replacing injured Ante Ćorić late into a 2–3 home loss against SD Ponferradina. The following 5 May, amidst the COVID-19 pandemic, he renewed his contract with the club until 2024.

On 18 September 2020, Enri was loaned to FC Andorra in the third division, for the 2020–21 season. The following 12 July, he signed a permanent three-year deal with the club, and helped in the club's first-ever promotion to the second tier at the end of the season.

On 18 July 2022, Enri was loaned to Primera Federación side UE Cornellà, for one year. On 30 July of the following year, he moved to fellow third division side CF Rayo Majadahonda after terminating his contract with Andorra.
