= Aristote Nkaka =

Belgian footballer

Personal information
- Full name: Aristote Nkaka Bazunga
- Date of birth: 27 March 1996 (age 30)
- Place of birth: Ghlin, Belgium
- Height: 1.82 m (6 ft 0 in)
- Position: Defensive midfielder

Team information
- Current team: Guangxi Pingguo

Youth career
- 2012–2015: Club Brugge
- 2015–2016: Excel Mouscron

Senior career*
Years	Team	Apps	(Gls)
2016–2018	Mouscron	40	(2)
2018–2019	Oostende	31	(0)
2019–2023	Anderlecht	0	(0)
2019	→ Almería (loan)	1	(1)
2019–2020	→ Racing Santander (loan)	16	(0)
2020–2021	→ SC Paderborn (loan)	13	(0)
2021–2022	→ Waasland-Beveren (loan)	10	(0)
2023–2024	Lierse	16	(0)
2025-	Guangxi Pingguo	0	(0)

International career
2017–2018	Belgium U21	4	(0)
- * Club domestic league appearances and goals as of 12 May 2024

Aristote Nkaka Bazunga (born 27 March 1996) is a Belgian professional footballer who plays as a midfielder for Guangxi Pingguo. Mainly a defensive midfielder, he can also play as a centre back.

== Club career ==
Nkaka signed for Mouscron in June 2015, arriving from the Club Brugge academy. He scored his first goal in a 2–1 loss against his previous club, Brugge, on 26 January 2017.

On 17 July 2019, Nkaka was loaned to Segunda División side UD Almería from Anderlecht, for one year. He made his debut for the club on 17 August, coming off the bench and scoring the third in a 3–0 home victory against Albacete Balompié.

On 26 August 2019, Nkaka's loan with the Andalusians was terminated due to the club's change of ownership, and agreed to a one-year loan deal with fellow league team Racing de Santander just hours later.

On 31 August 2021, he joined Waasland-Beveren on loan with an option to buy.

On 26 July 2023, Nkaka signed a one-year contract with Lierse.

== International career ==
Nkaka was born in Belgium and is of Congolese descent.
