= Francisco Callejón =

Spanish footballer

Personal information
- Full name: Francisco Callejón Segura
- Date of birth: 15 May 1998 (age 28)
- Place of birth: Pujaire, Spain
- Height: 1.82 m (6 ft 0 in)
- Positions: Midfielder; centre-back

Team information
- Current team: Tunari
- Number: 8

Youth career
- Pavía
- 2010–2017: Almería

Senior career*
Years	Team	Apps	(Gls)
2016–2020	Almería B	97	(4)
2017–2021	Almería	4	(0)
2020–2021	→ Betis B (loan)	16	(1)
2021–2022	Betis B	25	(1)
2022–2023	Linares	33	(1)
2023–2024	Sabadell	10	(0)
2024	UCAM Murcia	13	(2)
2024–2025	Estepona	14	(0)
2025–2026	Socuéllamos	24	(0)
2026–	Tunari	6	(0)
- * Club domestic league appearances and goals as of 4 April 2026

Francisco Callejón Segura (born 15 May 1998) is a Spanish footballer who plays for Liga II club Tunari. Mainly a central midfielder, he can also play as a centre-back.

== Club career ==
Born in Pujaire, Almería, Andalusia, Callejón joined UD Almería's youth setup in 2010, aged 12, from UDC Pavía. He made his senior debut with the B-team on 23 October 2016, starting in a 2–2 Tercera División away draw against CD El Palo.

Definitely promoted to the reserves in January 2017, Callejón scored his first senior goal on 15 January, netting the equalizer in a 1–1 draw at UD Ciudad de Torredonjimeno. On 9 April he made his first team debut, coming on as a second-half substitute for Kalu Uche in a 2–2 home draw against Real Zaragoza in the Segunda División championship.

On 5 May 2020, amidst the COVID-19 pandemic, Callejón renewed his contract with the club until 2023. On 10 September, however, he was loaned to Betis Deportivo Balompié for the 2020–21 campaign.

On 15 July 2021, Callejón signed a permanent five-year contract with the Verdiblancos.

== Honours ==
Socuéllamos

- Tercera Federación: 2024–25
