= Jacob Ponto =

King of the Kingdom of Siau from 1851 to 1889

Jacob Ponto was the 14th king of the Kingdom of Siau. He ruled the Kingdom of Siau for 39 years from 1851 to 1889 AD.

== Biography ==
During his 39 years ruling the Siau kingdom, in addition to refusing to follow the wishes of the Dutch, Jacob Ponto was also known as a king who did not want to make his people suffer, he refused to raise the per capita tax even though the Dutch forced him. He also refused to fly the Dutch flag in the Siau Kingdom palace, he only wanted to fly the Red and White flag which had long been used as the flag of the Siau Kingdom. Jacob Ponto's rebellion after rebellion made the Dutch furious, even so the Dutch could not do much, because Jacob Ponto was loved by his people. Therefore, the Dutch planned a cunning tactic to get rid of Jacob Ponto.

In 1889, on the pretext of negotiating, the Deputy Resident of Manado came to Siau and asked Jacob Ponto to board a ship that was anchored at Ulu Siau Harbor. The Dutch stated that they wanted to discuss important matters with the king. However, while on the ship, Jacob Ponto was captured, then exiled to Cirebon Residency. While being held captive on the ship and sent to Cirebon, Jacob Ponto was treated badly, causing him suffering. Jacob Ponto arrived in Cirebon with a skin disease, causing him to be sickly.

== Death ==
Before he died, Jacob Ponto requested to be moved to an area that had hot springs, he wanted to settle in the area, he did this to cure his skin disease. The Dutch granted Jacob Ponto's request and placed him in Sangkanurip Village which did have hot springs. In that village, Jacob Ponto was abandoned by the Dutch, his life was impoverished. On May 3, 1890, while bathing in the Sangkanurip hot spring, Jacob Ponto died. The local residents then buried him not far from the area. Sangkanurip Village used to be part of the Cirebon Residency, now part of the administrative area of Kuningan Regency, West Java.

The bright spot regarding Jacob Ponto's identity was only discovered when one of his descendants who traced his footsteps around the 1960s, namely G.D. Ponto, came and revealed that he was a Siau king who was exiled by the Dutch.
