= Simón Moreno =

Spanish footballer

Personal information
- Full name: Simón Moreno Barroso
- Date of birth: 2 July 1997 (age 29)
- Place of birth: Cartaya, Spain
- Height: 1.74 m (5 ft 9 in)
- Position: Forward

Team information
- Current team: Minera
- Number: 23

Youth career
- Recreativo
- 2006–2015: Villarreal

Senior career*
Years	Team	Apps	(Gls)
2015–2017	Villarreal C	63	(15)
2017–2021	Villarreal B	65	(20)
2019	→ Almería (loan)	0	(0)
2020–2021	→ Cartagena (loan)	10	(0)
2021	→ Mirandés (loan)	12	(1)
2021–2023	Mirandés	19	(4)
2023–2024	Intercity	23	(0)
2024–2025	Jedinstvo Ub	12	(1)
2025	Tudelano	5	(0)
2026–	Minera	9	(0)

International career
2015	Spain U18	4	(1)
- * Club domestic league appearances and goals as of 7 May 2026

Simón Moreno Barroso (born 2 July 1997) is a Spanish professional footballer who plays as a forward for Segunda Federación club Minera.

== Club career ==
=== Villarreal ===
Born in Cartaya, Province of Huelva, Andalusia, Moreno joined Villarreal CF's academy at the age of 9. He made his senior debut with the C team on 22 August 2015, coming on as a second-half substitute for Mario González in a 1–1 Tercera División away draw against UD Alzira.

Moreno scored his first senior goal on 22 November 2015, opening the 2–2 home draw with FC Jove Español San Vicente. He was promoted to the reserves in the Segunda División B in July 2017, and was their top scorer in the 2018–19 season with 13 goals.

On 27 June 2019, Moreno was loaned to UD Almería for one year. On 3 September, however, the move was terminated after the club suffered a change of ownership; he subsequently joined fellow Segunda División club Málaga CF also on a temporary basis, but the deal eventually fell through and he returned to Villarreal B.

In November 2019, Moreno suffered an anterior cruciate ligament injury, being sidelined for the remainder of the campaign. The following 12 August, he joined second-division newcomers FC Cartagena on a one-year loan.

Moreno made his professional debut on 13 September 2020, starting in a 0–0 draw at Real Oviedo.

=== Mirandés ===
In February 2021, Moreno was loaned to second-tier CD Mirandés until 30 June. He scored his first goal in the league on 13 March, his team's second in a 2–2 home draw against eventual champions RCD Espanyol.

Moreno signed a permanent contract on 5 July 2021. He missed most of 2021–22 and the entire following season, due to another serious knee injury.

== Personal life ==
Moreno's elder brother José Luis was also a footballer and a forward. He also played youth football at Villarreal.
