= Enzo Zidane =

French footballer (born 1995)

Personal information
- Full name: Enzo Alan Zidane
- Date of birth: 24 March 1995 (age 31)
- Place of birth: Bordeaux, France
- Height: 1.86 m (6 ft 1 in)
- Position: Midfielder

Youth career
- 2000: Juventus
- 2000–2001: Liceo Francés
- 2001–2004: San José
- 2004–2014: Real Madrid

Senior career*
Years	Team	Apps	(Gls)
2014–2015	Real Madrid C	26	(4)
2014–2017	Real Madrid B	78	(7)
2016–2017	Real Madrid	0	(0)
2017	Alavés	2	(0)
2017–2019	Lausanne-Sport	16	(2)
2018–2019	→ Rayo Majadahonda (loan)	33	(0)
2019	Aves	10	(2)
2020	Almería	4	(0)
2021–2022	Rodez	15	(0)
2021–2022	Rodez B	3	(0)
2022–2023	Fuenlabrada	28	(1)
Total		215	(16)

International career
2009	Spain U15	1	(0)
2014	France U19	2	(0)
- * Club domestic league appearances and goals

Enzo Alan Zidane (born 24 March 1995), known simply as Enzo, is a French former professional footballer who played as a midfielder.

Zidane is a youth product of Real Madrid, where he scored on his only first-team appearance in the Copa del Rey in 2016. In 2017, Zidane signed for La Liga club Alavés, where he would make four appearances before signing for Swiss Super League club Lausanne-Sport. After a season, he joined Segunda División side Rayo Majadahonda on loan. In 2019, Zidane signed for Primeira Liga club Aves, a year before returning to the Segunda División with Almería. In 2021, he returned to his birth country of France by signing for Ligue 2 club Rodez, where he would play a season before joining Fuenlabrada in the Primera Federación in Spain.

Zidane is former youth international of both Spain and France, having played for the Spain under-15s in 2009 and the France under-19s in 2014. He is the eldest son of former footballer Zinedine Zidane and Véronique Fernández. He attained Spanish citizenship in 2006.

== Club career ==
=== Real Madrid ===
From 2004, Zidane played for the youth academy of Real Madrid. On 6 September 2011, he was invited by José Mourinho to train with the club's first team.

On 5 August 2013, Zidane was promoted to the Juvenil 'A' team.

On 16 November 2014, Zidane made his debut for Real Madrid Castilla, the B-team, as a substitute in a 2–1 win over Conquense in Segunda División B.

On 12 August 2015, Zidane was named one of the vice-captains of Castilla. He scored his first senior goal ten days later in the first game of the 2015–16 season, a 5–1 home routing of Ebro.

On 29 October, Zidane was promoted to train regularly with the first team. He made his senior debut for the club on 30 November 2016, coming off the bench for Isco in a Copa del Rey clash with Cultural Leonesa and scoring from the edge of the penalty area in a 6–1 home win (13–2 aggregate).

=== Alavés ===
On 29 June 2017, Alavés announced their signing of Zidane from Real Madrid on a 3-year contract for an undisclosed fee, with a buyback clause. He made his La Liga debut on 26 August, coming on as a late substitute for Mubarak Wakaso in a 0–2 home loss against Barcelona.

=== Lausanne-Sport ===
On 1 January 2018, Zidane signed for Lausanne-Sport of the Swiss Super League on a three-year deal after terminating his contract at Alavés. He was the first signing by the club after their takeover by British petrochemical corporation Ineos that November. He made his debut on 3 February as the season resumed after the winter break, coming on as a 68th-minute substitute for Andrea Maccoppi in a 2–1 loss at Luzern. Fifteen days later he scored his first goal for the team, consolation in a 3–1 loss at Sion. He scored once more that season, opening a 2–1 win over Lugano at the Stade olympique de la Pontaise on 2 April.

On 14 July 2018, Zidane returned to Spain after agreeing to a one-year loan deal with Rayo Majadahonda in the second division. He made his debut on 19 August in the season opener away to Real Zaragoza, received a yellow card and was substituted at half time for Toni Martínez in a 2–1 defeat.

=== Aves ===
On 15 July 2019, Zidane joined Portuguese side Aves as a free agent, having previously been in negotiations with nearby Vitória de Guimarães. On his second substitute appearance on 23 August, he scored his first Primeira Liga goal, consolation in a 5–1 loss at Rio Ave.

=== Almería ===
In the last minutes of the January 2020 transfer window, Zidane agreed to a move to Almería, returning to Spain and its second division. He was released on 2 October having played only four times, once in a playoff; the team were managed by his father's long-time teammate Guti.

In September 2020, reports emerged that Zidane would join Moroccan club Wydad CA, citing Roberto Carlos, a Brazilian former teammate of his father who was claimed to be his agent. However, French journalist Frédéric Hermel assured that the reports were false.

=== Later career and retirement ===
On 9 June 2021, Zidane signed for Ligue 2 club Rodez. On 18 July 2022, Zidane joined Fuenlabrada in the Primera Federación on a one-year contract. He played 29 times in all competitions and scored once, the only goal at San Sebastián de los Reyes on 11 December.

In September 2024, Zidane announced his retirement from professional football, at age 29. According to Enzo himself, he wants to focus on family matters and his own investments.

== International career ==
Zidane was eligible to play for France or Spain, as well as Algeria, through his paternal grandparents. In 2010, Zinedine Zidane stated that he was relaxed about whether his son chooses to play for Spain or France at senior international level. Enzo made one appearance for the Spain national under-15 football team in 2009. He switched to the French Football Federation, and made two appearances for the France national under-19 football team in 2014.

== Personal life ==
Enzo is the oldest son of Zinedine Zidane and Véronique Fernández and was previously known as Enzo Fernández. He is named after former Uruguayan star Enzo Francescoli, who was his father's football idol.

Enzo has three younger brothers: Luca plays for Leganés, while Théo and Elyaz play for Cordoba CF and Red Star respectively. He is married to Karen Gonçalves; together, they have three daughters: Sia (born 2022) and twins Giulia and Kaia (born 2024).

== Club statistics ==
As of match played 20 May 2023

Appearances and goals by club, season, and competition
Club	Season	League			Cup		Other		Total	
Club	Season	Division	Apps	Goals	Apps	Goals	Apps	Goals	Apps	Goals
Real Madrid B	2014–15	Segunda División B	8	0	—		—		8	0
Real Madrid B	2015–16	Segunda División B	38	2	—		—		38	2
Real Madrid B	2016–17	Segunda División B	32	5	—		—		32	5
Real Madrid B	Total		78	7	—		—		78	7
Real Madrid	2016–17	La Liga	0	0	1	1	0	0	1	1
Alavés	2017–18	La Liga	2	0	2	0	—		4	0
Lausanne-Sport	2017–18	Swiss Super League	16	2	0	0	—		16	2
Rayo Majadahonda (loan)	2018–19	Segunda División	33	0	1	0	—		34	0
Aves	2019–20	Primeira Liga	10	2	0	0	0	0	10	2
Almería	2019–20	Segunda División	4	0	0	0	—		4	0
Rodez	2021–22	Ligue 2	15	0	1	0	—		16	0
Rodez B	2021–22	Championnat National 3	3	0	—		—		3	0
Fuenlabrada	2022–23	Primera Federación	28	1	1	0	—		29	1
Career total			189	12	6	1	0	0	195	13
