= Japeri =

- Municipality
- Município de Japeri
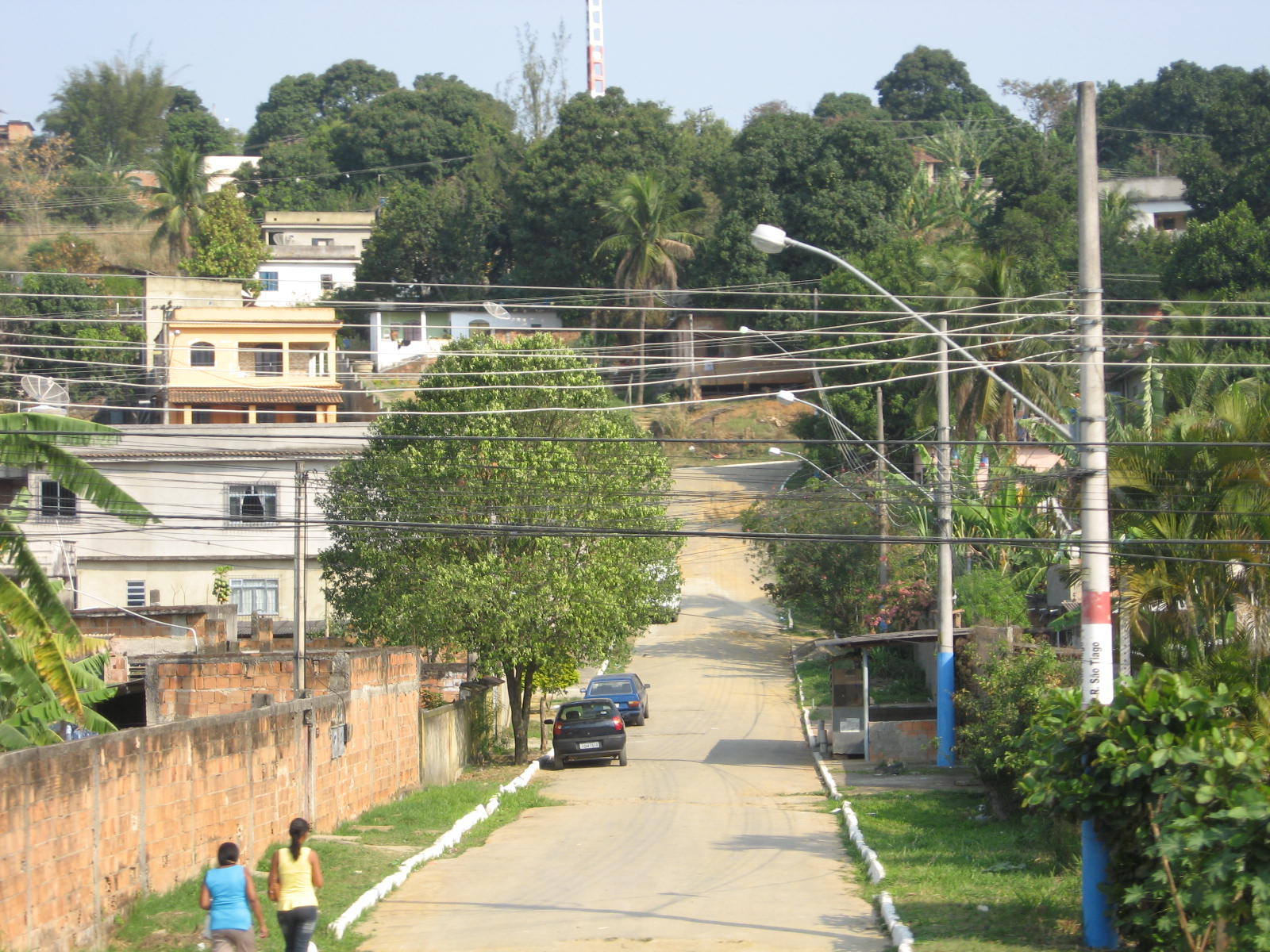

- Flag Coat of arms

- Location of Japeri in the state of Rio de Janeiro

- Location of Japeri in Brazil
- Coordinates: 22°38′35″S 43°39′12″W
- Country: Brazil
- Region: Southeast
- State: Rio de Janeiro

Area
  - Total: 82.454 km^{2} (31.836 sq mi)
- Elevation: 17 m (56 ft)

Population (2022 Census)
  - Total: 96,289
  - Estimate (2025): 102,171
  - Density: 1,167.8/km^{2} (3,024.6/sq mi)
- Time zone: UTC-3 (UTC-3)

Japeri (Portuguese pronunciation: [ʒapeˈɾi]) is a municipality in the state of Rio de Janeiro, Southeast Region of Brazil. The city was founded on June 30, 1991. It is known to be located next to the last station of the largest branch of the railroad of Brazil (Central do Brasil), whose image has been put on stamps in Brazil. The construction date of 1858 and was incorporated into the Central do Brasil in 1903. It was the first stop of compositions for São Paulo, including the famous Trem de Prata (Silver Train). In the district of Engenheiro Pedreira is the first public golf course of Brazil, sponsored by FGERJ - Golf Federation of Rio de Janeiro.

The territory at the foot of the Serra do Mar, is bathed by rivers Guandu, Santana, Rio dos Poços, Rio D'Ouro, Santo Antonio, Ribeirão das Lages and São Pedro.
