= Matías Nahuel =

Spanish footballer (born 1996)

Personal information
- Full name: Matías Nahuel Leiva Esquivel
- Date of birth: 22 November 1996 (age 29)
- Place of birth: Rosario, Argentina
- Height: 1.75 m (5 ft 9 in)
- Position: Winger

Team information
- Current team: Johor Darul Ta'zim F.C.
- Number: 77

Youth career
- 2009–2011: Escuela ADIUR
- 2011–2013: Villarreal

Senior career*
Years	Team	Apps	(Gls)
2012–2013	Villarreal C	12	(2)
2013–2015	Villarreal B	64	(11)
2014–2018	Villarreal	25	(0)
2016–2018	→ Betis (loan)	17	(0)
2018	→ Barcelona B (loan)	18	(5)
2018–2019	Olympiacos	4	(0)
2019	→ Deportivo La Coruña (loan)	13	(0)
2019–2022	Tenerife	30	(1)
2020–2021	→ Oviedo (loan)	37	(6)
2022–2024	Śląsk Wrocław	63	(12)
2024–2026	Maccabi Haifa	22	(2)
2026	→ Jagiellonia Białystok (loan)	16	(0)

International career
2014–2015	Spain U19	11	(3)
2015–2017	Spain U21	2	(0)
Medal record
Men's football
Representing Spain
UEFA European Under-19 Championship
Winner	2015 Greece
- * Club domestic league appearances and goals as of 20:10, 29 May 2026 (UTC)

Matías Nahuel Leiva Esquivel (born 22 November 1996), known as Nahuel, is a professional footballer who plays as a right winger for Malaysian football club Johor Darul Ta’zim. Born in Argentina, he has represented Spain at youth levels.

== Club career ==
=== Villarreal ===
Born in Rosario, Santa Fe, Argentina, Nahuel moved to Spain at only 14, joining Villarreal CF's youth setup. He made his senior debut with the C-side in 2012–13, in Tercera División, and also appeared occasionally for the reserves during that first season.

Nahuel made his first-team – and La Liga – debut on 13 January 2014, playing 23 minutes in a 5–1 home routing of Real Sociedad. On 28 August he scored his first professional goal, netting the last in a 4–0 home win against FC Astana for the campaign's UEFA Europa League.

On 16 June 2016, Nahuel signed a two-year loan contract with Real Betis also of the top tier. On 30 January 2018, he was loaned to Segunda División team FC Barcelona B for six months.

=== Olympiacos ===
On 31 August 2018, the last day of the summer transfer window, Olympiacos F.C. signed Nahuel for an undisclosed fee – Villarreal retained a buyback option on the player. The following 31 January, after being rarely used, he returned to Spain after agreeing to a six-month loan deal with Deportivo de La Coruña of the second division.

=== Tenerife ===
On 30 August 2019, Nahuel joined CD Tenerife on a three-year contract. On 15 September, after scoring only one goal during the entire 2019–20 campaign, he was loaned to fellow second division side Real Oviedo, for one year.

=== Śląsk Wrocław ===
On 9 July 2022, Nahuel moved to Ekstraklasa club Śląsk Wrocław, signing a four-year deal. On 11 January 2024, he extended his contract until the end of June 2027.

=== Maccabi Haifa ===
On 18 September 2024, Nahuel moved to Israeli club Maccabi Haifa, signing a four-year deal.

==== Loan to Jagiellonia ====
On 28 January 2026, Polish club Jagiellonia Białystok announced the signing of Leiva on loan for the remainder of the season.

JDT Recently signed

== International career ==
Nahuel was part of the Spain under-19 team which won the 2015 UEFA European Championship in Greece. He scored in a 3–0 group stage opening victory against holders Germany, adding the second goal in the 2–0 win over Russia in the decisive match in Katerini.

== Honours ==
Spain U19

- UEFA European Under-19 Championship: 2015
