= 2025–26 Real Betis season =

Real Betis
2025–26 season
- President: Ángel Haro
- Head coach: Manuel Pellegrini
- Stadium: La Cartuja
- La Liga: 5th
- Copa del Rey: Quarter-finals
- UEFA Europa League: Quarter-finals
- Top goalscorer: League: Cucho Hernández (11); All: Cucho Hernández (15)
- Average home league attendance: 57,427
- Biggest win: Palma del Río 1–7 Real Betis
- Biggest defeat: Atlético Madrid 5–0 Real Betis
Home colours	Away colours	Third colours

The 2025–26 season was the 119th season in the history of Real Betis, and the club's eleventh consecutive season in La Liga. In addition to the domestic league, the club participated in the Copa del Rey and the UEFA Europa League.

Betis finished the league season in fifth place, securing a spot in the UEFA Champions League for the first time in 21 years.

== Players ==
=== First-team ===
As of 2 February 2026

Note: Flags indicate national team as defined under FIFA eligibility rules; some limited exceptions apply. Players may hold more than one non-FIFA nationality.

No.	Pos.	Nation	Player
1	GK	ESP	Álvaro Valles
2	DF	ESP	Héctor Bellerín (3rd captain)
3	DF	ESP	Diego Llorente
4	DF	BRA	Natan
5	DF	ESP	Marc Bartra (vice-captain)
6	MF	ESP	Sergi Altimira
7	FW	BRA	Antony
8	MF	ESP	Pablo Fornals
9	FW	ARG	Chimy Ávila
10	FW	MAR	Abde Ezzalzouli
11	FW	COD	Cédric Bakambu
12	DF	SUI	Ricardo Rodriguez
13	GK	ESP	Adrián
14	MF	MAR	Sofyan Amrabat (on loan from Fenerbahçe)

No.	Pos.	Nation	Player
15	MF	MEX	Álvaro Fidalgo
16	DF	ARG	Valentín Gómez
17	FW	ESP	Rodrigo Riquelme
18	MF	COL	Nelson Deossa
19	FW	COL	Cucho Hernández
20	MF	ARG	Giovani Lo Celso
21	MF	ESP	Marc Roca
22	MF	ESP	Isco (captain)
23	DF	DOM	Junior Firpo
24	FW	ESP	Aitor Ruibal (4th captain)
25	GK	ESP	Pau López
40	DF	ESP	Ángel Ortiz
52	FW	ESP	Pablo García

=== Reserve team ===
Note: Flags indicate national team as defined under FIFA eligibility rules; some limited exceptions apply. Players may hold more than one non-FIFA nationality.

No.	Pos.	Nation	Player
27	FW	ESP	José Antonio Morante
28	MF	GHA	Mawuli Mensah
30	GK	ESP	Germán García
35	DF	ESP	Félix Garreta

No.	Pos.	Nation	Player
36	DF	FRA	Darling Bladi
37	MF	ESP	Dani Pérez
41	GK	ESP	Manu González
50	MF	ESP	Iván Corralejo

=== Out on loan ===
Note: Flags indicate national team as defined under FIFA eligibility rules; some limited exceptions apply. Players may hold more than one non-FIFA nationality.

No.	Pos.	Nation	Player
—	GK	POR	Guilherme Fernandes (at Valladolid until 30 June 2026)
—	DF	ESP	Sergio Arribas (at Huesca until 30 June 2026)
—	DF	SEN	Nobel Mendy (at Rayo Vallecano until 30 June 2026)
—	MF	ESP	Lamine Gueye (at Ourense until 30 June 2026)

No.	Pos.	Nation	Player
—	MF	ESP	Mateo Flores (at Arouca until 30 June 2026)
—	FW	ESP	Iker Losada (at Levante until 30 June 2026)
—	FW	URU	Gonzalo Petit (at Granada until 30 June 2026)

== Competitions ==
=== Overall record ===
Competition	First match	Last match	Starting round	Final position	Record							
Competition	First match	Last match	Starting round	Final position	Pld	W	D	L	GF	GA	GD	Win %
La Liga	18 August 2025	23 May 2026	Matchday 1	5th	38	15	15	8	59	48	+11	39.47
Copa del Rey	30 October 2025	5 February 2026	First round	Quarter-finals	5	4	0	1	15	8	+7	80.00
UEFA Europa League	24 September 2025	16 April 2026	League phase	Quarter-finals	12	6	3	3	20	13	+7	50.00
Total					55	25	18	12	94	69	+25	45.45

Source: Soccerway

=== La Liga ===
==== League table ====
Pos	Team	Pld	W	D	L	GF	GA	GD	Pts	Qualification or relegation
3	Villarreal	38	22	6	10	72	46	+26	72	Qualification for the Champions League league phase (Note: La Liga gained an additional Champions League place as a result of Spain gaining one of the two European Performance Spots (EPS) awarded to the two associations with the highest UEFA coefficient points in 2025–26.)
4	Atlético Madrid	38	21	6	11	62	44	+18	69	Qualification for the Champions League league phase
5	Real Betis	38	15	15	8	59	48	+11	60	Qualification for the Champions League league phase
6	Celta Vigo	38	14	12	12	53	48	+5	54	Qualification for the Europa League league phase
7	Getafe	38	15	6	17	32	38	−6	51	Qualification for the Conference League play-off round

Source: LaLiga EA Sports
Rules for classification: 1) Points; 2) Head-to-head points; 3) Head-to-head goal difference; 4) Goal difference; 5) Goals scored; 6) Fair-play points
(Note: Head-to-head record is used only after all the matches between the teams in question have been played)

==== Results summary ====
Overall								Home						Away					
Pld	W	D	L	GF	GA	GD	Pts	W	D	L	GF	GA	GD	W	D	L	GF	GA	GD
38	15	15	8	59	48	+11	60	10	6	3	34	19	+15	5	9	5	25	29	−4

Source: La Liga

==== Results by round ====
Round	1	2	3	4	5	6	7	8	9	10	11	12	13	14	15	16	17	18	19	20	21	22	23	24	25	26	27	28	29	30	31	32	33	34	35	36	37	38
Ground	A	H	H	A	H	A	H	A	A	H	H	A	H	A	H	A	H	A	A	H	A	H	A	A	H	H	A	H	A	H	A	A	H	H	A	H	A	H
Result	D	W	L	D	W	D	W	W	D	L	W	D	D	W	L	D	W	L	D	W	L	W	W	W	D	D	L	D	L	D	D	W	D	W	D	W	L	W
Position	9	7	10	10	8	9	6	4	5	6	5	5	5	5	6	6	6	6	6	6	6	5	5	5	5	5	5	5	5	5	5	5	5	5	5	5	5	5

Source: La Liga
A = Away; H = Home; W = Win; D = Draw; L = Loss

=== Copa del Rey ===
30 October 2025 First round	Atlético Palma del Río	1–7	Real Betis	Palma del Río
21:00		Report		Stadium: Estadio Sergio León

3 December 2025 Second round	Torrent	1–4	Real Betis	Valencia (Note: Torrent did not play the match in their main stadium Estadio San Gregorio, Torrent, due to problems with the stadium renovation work.)
21:00	Corbalán 85'	Report	Riquelme 11', 43', 75'; Ortiz 90'	Stadium: Estadio Ciutat de València; Attendance: 6,680; Referee: José María Sánchez Santos

18 December 2025 Round of 32	Murcia	0–2	Real Betis	Murcia
21:00		Report	Hernández 30' (pen.); Piñeiro 85' (o.g.)	Stadium: Nueva Condomina; Referee: Juan Martínez Munuera

14 January 2026 Round of 16	Real Betis	2–1	Elche	Seville
21:00	Ávila 68', 80'	Report	Pétrot 58'	Stadium: La Cartuja; Attendance: 37,635; Referee: Jesús Gil Manzano

5 February 2026 Quarter-finals	Real Betis	0–5	Atlético Madrid	Seville
21:00		Report	Hancko 12'; Simeone 30'; Lookman 37'; Griezmann 62'; Almada 83'	Stadium: La Cartuja; Attendance: 66,810; Referee: César Soto Grado

=== UEFA Europa League ===
==== League phase ====
===== League table =====
Pos	Team	Pld	W	D	L	GF	GA	GD	Pts	Qualification
2	(The Football Association) Aston Villa	8	7	0	1	14	6	+8	21	Advance to round of 16 (seeded)
3	(Danish Football Association) Midtjylland	8	6	1	1	18	8	+10	19	Advance to round of 16 (seeded)
4	(Royal Spanish Football Federation) Real Betis	8	5	2	1	13	7	+6	17 (Note: Away goals scored: Real Betis 5, Porto 3.)	Advance to round of 16 (seeded)
5	(Portuguese Football Federation) Porto	8	5	2	1	13	7	+6	17	Advance to round of 16 (seeded)
6	(Portuguese Football Federation) Braga	8	5	2	1	11	5	+6	17	Advance to round of 16 (seeded)

Source: UEFA
Rules for classification: League phase tiebreakers

===== Results by round =====
Round	1	2	3	4	5	6	7	8
Ground	H	A	A	H	H	A	A	H
Result	D	W	D	W	W	W	L	W
Position	16	9	16	9	5	4	8	4
Points	1	4	5	8	11	14	14	17

Source: UEFA
A = Away; H = Home; W = Win; D = Draw; L = Loss

24 September 2025 1	Real Betis (Royal Spanish Football Federation)	2–2	(The Football Association) Nottingham Forest	La Cartuja, Seville (Note: Real Betis played their home matches at La Cartuja, Seville, instead of their regular stadium, Benito Villamarín, Seville, due to renovation works.)
21:00	Bakambu 15'; Antony 85'	Report	Igor Jesus 18', 23'	Attendance: 57,257; Referee: Sascha Stegemann (Germany)

2 October 2025 2	Ludogorets Razgrad (Bulgarian Football Union)	0–2	(Royal Spanish Football Federation) Real Betis	Huvepharma Arena, Razgrad
18:45 (19:45 UTC+3)		Report	Lo Celso 31'; Son 53' (o.g.)	Attendance: 5,844; Referee: Julian Weinberger (Austria)

23 October 2025 3	Genk (Royal Belgian Football Association)	0–0	(Royal Spanish Football Federation) Real Betis	Cegeka Arena, Genk
18:45		Report		Attendance: 16,780; Referee: Elchin Masiyev (Azerbaijan)

6 November 2025 4	Real Betis (Royal Spanish Football Federation)	2–0	(French Football Federation) Lyon	La Cartuja, Seville
21:00	Ezzalzouli 30'; Antony 35'	Report		Attendance: 55,836; Referee: Matej Jug (Slovenia)

27 November 2025 5	Real Betis (Royal Spanish Football Federation)	2–1	(Royal Dutch Football Association) Utrecht	La Cartuja, Seville
21:00	Hernández 42'; Ezzalzouli 50'	Report	Rodríguez 55'	Attendance: 46,170; Referee: Nenad Minaković (Serbia)

11 December 2025 6	Dinamo Zagreb (Croatian Football Federation)	1–3	(Royal Spanish Football Federation) Real Betis	Stadion Maksimir, Zagreb
18:45	Galešić 89'	Report	Domínguez 31' (o.g.); Riquelme 34'; Antony 38'	Attendance: 11,437; Referee: Goga Kikacheishvili (Georgia)

22 January 2026 7	PAOK (Hellenic Football Federation)	2–0	(Royal Spanish Football Federation) Real Betis	Toumba Stadium, Thessaloniki
18:45 (19:45 UTC+2)	Živković 67'; Giakoumakis 86' (pen.)	Report		Attendance: 22,221; Referee: Simone Sozza (Italy)

29 January 2026 8	Real Betis (Royal Spanish Football Federation)	2–1	(Royal Dutch Football Association) Feyenoord	La Cartuja, Seville
21:00	Antony 17'; Ezzalzouli 32'	Report	Tengstedt 77'	Attendance: 42,688; Referee: Nikola Dabanović (Montenegro)

==== Knockout phase ====
===== Round of 16 =====
12 March 2026 First leg	Panathinaikos (Greece)	1–0	(Spain) Real Betis	Olympic Stadium, Athens
18:45 (19:45 UTC+2)	Taborda 88' (pen.)	Report		Attendance: 27,479; Referee: Szymon Marciniak (Poland)

19 March 2026 Second leg	Real Betis (Spain)	4–0 (4–1 agg.)	(Greece) Panathinaikos	La Cartuja, Seville
21:00	Ruibal 8'; Amrabat 45+1'; Hernández 53'; Antony 66'	Report		Attendance: 60,207; Referee: Tobias Stieler (Germany)

===== Quarter-finals =====
8 April 2026 First leg	Braga (Portugal)	1–1	(Spain) Real Betis	Estádio Municipal, Braga
18:45 (17:45 UTC+1)	Grillitsch 5'	Report	Hernández 61' (pen.)	Attendance: 20,847; Referee: Felix Zwayer (Germany)

16 April 2026 Second leg	Real Betis (Spain)	2–4 (3–5 agg.)	(Portugal) Braga	La Cartuja, Seville
21:00	Antony 13'; Ezzalzouli 26'	Report	Víctor 38'; Carvalho 49'; Horta 53' (pen.); Gorby 74'	Attendance: 66,694; Referee: Davide Massa (Italy)

== Statistics ==
=== Squad statistics ===
No.	Pos	Nat	Player	Total		La Liga		Copa del Rey		UEFA Europa League	
No.	Pos	Nat	Player	Apps	Goals	Apps	Goals	Apps	Goals	Apps	Goals
Goalkeepers
1	GK	(Spain) ESP	Álvaro Valles	33	0	28	0	0	0	5	0
13	GK	(Spain) ESP	Adrián	6	0	1	0	5	0	0	0
25	GK	(Spain) ESP	Pau López	16	0	9	0	0	0	7	0
Defenders
2	DF	(Spain) ESP	Héctor Bellerín	29	2	27	2	0	0	2	0
3	DF	(Spain) ESP	Diego Llorente	29	2	18	1	4	1	7	0
4	DF	(Brazil) BRA	Natan	45	0	33	0	3	0	9	0
5	DF	(Spain) ESP	Marc Bartra	34	1	25	1	4	0	5	0
12	DF	(Switzerland) SUI	Ricardo Rodriguez	35	0	23	0	3	0	9	0
16	DF	(Argentina) ARG	Valentín Gómez	41	1	28	1	4	0	9	0
23	DF	(Dominican Republic) DOM	Junior Firpo	16	0	12	0	1	0	3	0
36	DF	(France) FRA	Darling Bladi	1	0	0	0	1	0	0	0
40	DF	(Spain) ESP	Ángel Ortiz	23	1	13	0	4	1	6	0
Midfielders
6	MF	(Spain) ESP	Sergi Altimira	40	2	24	1	5	1	11	0
8	MF	(Spain) ESP	Pablo Fornals	51	9	37	9	3	0	11	0
14	MF	(Morocco) MAR	Sofyan Amrabat	23	1	17	0	0	0	6	1
15	MF	(Mexico) MEX	Álvaro Fidalgo	13	1	9	1	1	0	3	0
18	MF	(Colombia) COL	Nelson Deossa	33	0	20	0	4	0	9	0
20	MF	(Argentina) ARG	Giovani Lo Celso	32	3	24	2	2	0	6	1
21	MF	(Spain) ESP	Marc Roca	40	1	29	1	3	0	8	0
22	MF	(Spain) ESP	Isco	9	1	8	1	0	0	1	0
37	MF	(Spain) ESP	Dani Pérez	2	0	1	0	0	0	1	0
50	MF	(Spain) ESP	Iván Corralejo	3	0	1	0	2	0	0	0
Forwards
7	FW	(Brazil) BRA	Antony	46	14	32	8	4	0	10	6
9	FW	(Argentina) ARG	Chimy Ávila	30	3	16	1	5	2	9	0
10	FW	(Morocco) MAR	Abde Ezzalzouli	43	15	29	10	2	1	12	4
11	FW	(Democratic Republic of the Congo) COD	Cédric Bakambu	27	4	18	3	3	0	6	1
17	FW	(Spain) ESP	Rodrigo Riquelme	38	7	25	1	5	5	8	1
19	FW	(Colombia) COL	Cucho Hernández	40	15	32	11	1	1	7	3
24	FW	(Spain) ESP	Aitor Ruibal	42	5	27	4	5	0	10	1
27	FW	(Spain) ESP	José Antonio Morante	1	0	0	0	0	0	1	0
52	FW	(Spain) ESP	Pablo García	25	2	15	0	4	2	6	0

Last updated: 30 June 2026
Source: Competitions
