= 2025 UEFA Conference League final =

- Match programme cover
- Event: 2024–25 UEFA Conference League
Real Betis	Chelsea
(Royal Spanish Football Federation)	(The Football Association)
1	4
- Date: 28 May 2025
- Venue: Wrocław Stadium, Wrocław
- Man of the Match: Cole Palmer (Chelsea)
- Referee: Irfan Peljto (Bosnia and Herzegovina)
- Attendance: 39,754
- Weather: Partly cloudy night 15 °C (59 °F); 84% humidity

The 2025 UEFA Conference League final was the final match of the 2024–25 UEFA Conference League, the fourth season of Europe's tertiary club football tournament organised by UEFA, and the first season since it was renamed from the UEFA Europa Conference League to the UEFA Conference League. It was played at the Wrocław Stadium in Wrocław, Poland, on 28 May 2025, between Spanish club Real Betis and English club Chelsea.

Chelsea won the match 4–1 to secure their first UEFA Conference League title, thus becoming the first club to win all four major European trophies and all three of the current European competitions. Chelsea also became the first non-Spanish side to defeat a Spanish club in a European final since 2001, when Bayern Munich won against Valencia in the Champions League final. As Chelsea already qualified automatically for the league phase of the 2025–26 UEFA Champions League through their league position, the berth reserved for the UEFA Conference League winners in the 2025–26 UEFA Europa League was vacated.

The three-goal margin of victory in this match was the largest in a Conference League final, which saw the first three winners prevailed by a single-goal margin. This match was also the highest-scoring Conference League final.

== Background ==
Real Betis reached their first ever European final.

This was Chelsea's thirteenth European final and the first UEFA Conference League final appearance. They had won two titles in each of the three pre-1999 major European competitions; the UEFA Champions League in 2012 and 2021, the Cup Winners' Cup in 1971 and 1998, and the UEFA Europa League in 2013 and 2019, in addition they have also won two UEFA Super Cups, in 1998 and 2021. The club has lost four European finals, the 2008 UEFA Champions League final and the 2012, 2013 and 2019 UEFA Super Cups. As they win the final, they became the first club to have won all four major European trophies.

The clubs had faced each other four times; twice in the quarter-finals of the 1997–98 UEFA Cup Winners' Cup and twice in the 2005–06 UEFA Champions League group stage. Chelsea won three of those encounters, defeating Betis 2–1 in Seville and 3–1 in London to secure a 5–2 aggregate victory en route to the Cup Winners' Cup title, and triumphing 4–0 in their home fixture in the 2005–06 season. However, Betis claimed victory in the most recent meeting between the sides, winning 1–0 in Seville later that stage. Despite that loss, Chelsea advanced to the round of 16 by finishing second in the group, while Betis placed third and moved into the UEFA Cup—ultimately won by their city rivals, Sevilla.

=== Previous finals ===
Team	Previous final appearances
(Royal Spanish Football Federation) Real Betis	None
(The Football Association) Chelsea	None

== Venue ==
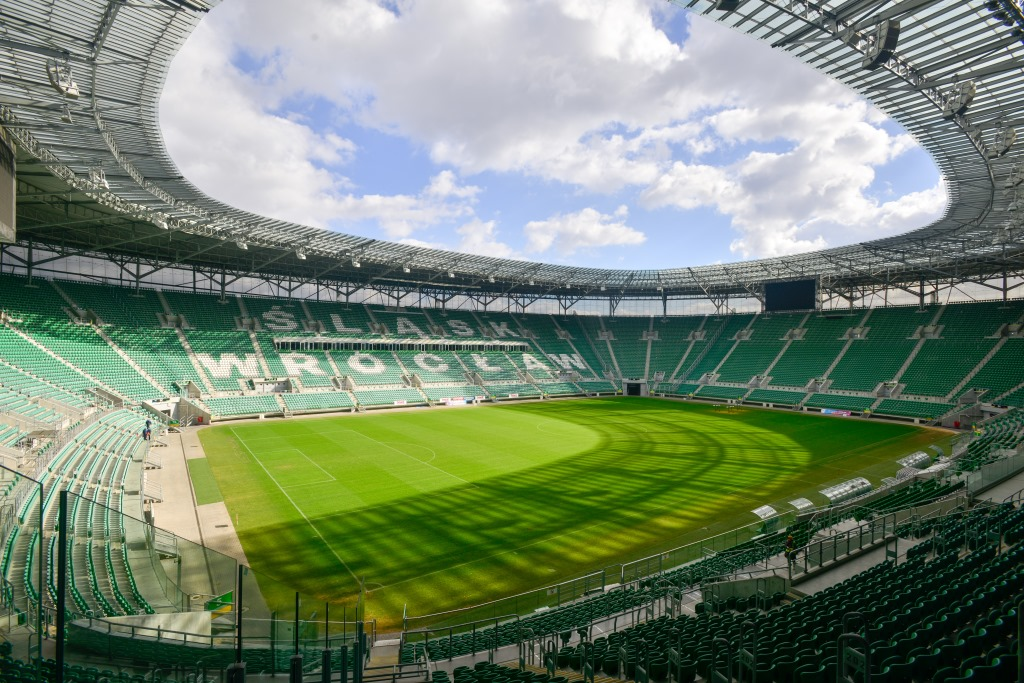
Wrocław Stadium in Wrocław hosted the final.

The Wrocław Stadium in Wrocław, known as the Tarczyński Arena for sponsorship reasons, is the home of Śląsk Wrocław. The stadium opened in September 2011, and had a capacity of 42,771. The venue previously hosted matches at UEFA Euro 2012. The match was the third single-leg UEFA club final to be played in Poland, after the UEFA Europa League finals in 2015 and 2021.

=== Host selection ===
On 21 June 2022, UEFA opened the bidding process for the final, which was held in parallel with that of the 2024 final. Interested bidders could bid for either one or both of the finals. The proposed venues had to include natural grass and be ranked as a UEFA category four stadium, with a gross capacity of between 30,000 and 50,000 preferred. The bidding timeline was as follows:

- 21 June 2022: Applications formally invited
- 31 August 2022: Closing date for registering intention to bid
- 7 September 2022: Bid requirements made available to bidders
- 3 November 2022: Submission of preliminary bid dossier
- 23 February 2023: Submission of final bid dossier
- 28 June 2023: Appointment of host

The UEFA Executive Committee appointed the Wrocław Stadium as the host during their meeting in Nyon, Switzerland, on 28 June 2023.

== Route to the final ==
Note: In all results below, the score of the finalist is given first (H: home; A: away).

(Royal Spanish Football Federation) Real Betis				Round	(The Football Association) Chelsea			
Opponent	Agg.	1st leg	2nd leg	Qualifying phase	Opponent	Agg.	1st leg	2nd leg
(Ukrainian Association of Football) Kryvbas Kryvyi Rih	5–0	2–0 (A)	3–0 (H)	Play-offs	(Swiss Football Association) Servette	3–2	2–0 (H)	1–2 (A)
Opponent	Result			League phase	Opponent	Result		
(Polish Football Association) Legia Warsaw	0–1 (A)			Matchday 1	(Royal Belgian Football Association) Gent	4–2 (H)		
(Danish Football Association) Copenhagen	1–1 (H)			Matchday 2	(Hellenic Football Federation) Panathinaikos	4–1 (A)		
(Football Association of Slovenia) Celje	2–1 (H)			Matchday 3	(Football Federation of Armenia) Noah	8–0 (H)		
(Football Association of the Czech Republic) Mladá Boleslav	1–2 (A)			Matchday 4	(German Football Association) 1. FC Heidenheim	2–0 (A)		
(Moldovan Football Federation) Petrocub Hîncești	1–0 (A)			Matchday 5	(Kazakhstan Football Federation) Astana	3–1 (A)		
(Football Association of Finland) HJK	1–0 (H)			Matchday 6	(Football Association of Ireland) Shamrock Rovers	5–1 (H)		
15th place Advanced to knockout phase play-offs				Final position	1st place Advanced to round of 16			
Opponent	Agg.	1st leg	2nd leg	Knockout phase	Opponent	Agg.	1st leg	2nd leg
(Royal Belgian Football Association) Gent	3–1	3–0 (A)	0–1 (H)	Play-offs	Bye			
(Portuguese Football Federation) Vitória de Guimarães	6–2	2–2 (H)	4–0 (A)	Round of 16	(Danish Football Association) Copenhagen	3–1	2–1 (A)	1–0 (H)
(Polish Football Association) Jagiellonia Białystok	3–1	2–0 (H)	1–1 (A)	Quarter-finals	(Polish Football Association) Legia Warsaw	4–2	3–0 (A)	1–2 (H)
(Italian Football Federation) Fiorentina	4–3	2–1 (H)	2–2 (a.e.t.) (A)	Semi-finals	(Swedish Football Association) Djurgårdens IF	5–1	4–1 (A)	1–0 (H)

== Match ==
=== Summary ===
Real Betis took the lead in the ninth minute after Isco played a ball across towards Abde Ezzalzouli, who slotted the ball into the bottom right-hand corner of the net. Betis pushed for another goal soon after, with Marc Bartra having an effort from outside the penalty area tipped over by Chelsea goalkeeper Filip Jörgensen. And in the 20th minute, Ezzalzouli came forward again for Betis, evading two Chelsea players before squaring the ball across to Johnny Cardoso whose effort was deflected over the bar by Benoît Badiashile.

In the 65th minute, Chelsea found their equaliser after Cole Palmer crossed the ball into the penalty area, where Enzo Fernández managed to head the ball beyond Betis goalkeeper Adrián and draw the game level. Five minutes later, Palmer played another cross into the penalty area, this time touched into the goal by Nicolas Jackson to complete the turnaround for Chelsea. In the 78th minute, a quick Chelsea counter-attack saw Jackson and Jadon Sancho in a two against one against the Betis goalkeeper. Despite being through on goal, Jackson took a heavy touch, and the opportunity was missed. However, Sancho would get his goal in the 83rd minute, when he cut inside on his right foot before curling his effort into the back of the net. Moisés Caicedo then wrapped up the win in the first minute of added time with a shot that deflected off defender Natan before beating Adrián down his bottom-right hand side. With the victory, Chelsea became the first team to win all five UEFA club tournaments, including the UEFA Champions League, UEFA Europa League, UEFA Conference League, UEFA Super Cup and the UEFA Cup Winners' Cup.

=== Details ===
The "home" team (for administrative purposes) was predetermined as the winner of semi-final 1 (Real Betis).

28 May 2025
21:00 UTC+2

Real Betis (Royal Spanish Football Federation)	1–4	(The Football Association) Chelsea
Ezzalzouli 9'	Report	Fernández 65'; Jackson 70'; Sancho 83'; Caicedo 90+1'

Wrocław Stadium, Wrocław
Attendance: 39,754
Referee: Irfan Peljto (Bosnia and Herzegovina)

Real Betis	Chelsea

GK	13	(Spain) Adrián
RB	23	(Senegal) Youssouf Sabaly
CB	5	(Spain) Marc Bartra
CB	6	(Brazil) Natan
LB	12	(Switzerland) Ricardo Rodriguez		(substituted off) 46'
CM	18	(Spain) Pablo Fornals		(substituted off) 85'
CM	22	(Spain) Isco (c)
CM	4	(United States) Johnny Cardoso		(substituted off) 85'
RF	7	(Brazil) Antony	(yellow card) 88'
CF	11	(Democratic Republic of the Congo) Cédric Bakambu		(substituted off) 72'
LF	10	(Morocco) Abde Ezzalzouli		(substituted off) 53'
Substitutes:
GK	25	(Spain) Fran Vieites
GK	41	(Spain) Manu González
DF	15	(France) Romain Perraud	(yellow card) 90+5'	(substituted on) 46'
DF	24	(Spain) Aitor Ruibal		(substituted on) 72'
DF	32	(Senegal) Nobel Mendy
DF	40	(Spain) Ángel Ortiz
MF	16	(Spain) Sergi Altimira		(substituted on) 85'
MF	20	(Argentina) Giovani Lo Celso		(substituted on) 85'
MF	46	(Spain) Mateo Flores
FW	36	(Spain) Jesús Rodríguez		(substituted on) 53'
FW	52	(Spain) Pablo García
Manager:
(Chile) Manuel Pellegrini

GK	12	(Denmark) Filip Jörgensen
RB	27	(France) Malo Gusto		(substituted off) 46'
CB	23	(England) Trevoh Chalobah
CB	5	(France) Benoît Badiashile	(yellow card) 55'	(substituted off) 61'
LB	3	(Spain) Marc Cucurella
CM	8	(Argentina) Enzo Fernández (c)
CM	25	(Ecuador) Moisés Caicedo
RW	11	(England) Noni Madueke
AM	20	(England) Cole Palmer	(yellow card) 79'	(substituted off) 87'
LW	7	(Portugal) Pedro Neto		(substituted off) 61'
CF	15	(Senegal) Nicolas Jackson		(substituted off) 80'
Substitutes:
GK	1	(Spain) Robert Sánchez
GK	47	(Finland) Lucas Bergström
DF	4	(England) Tosin Adarabioyo
DF	6	(England) Levi Colwill		(substituted on) 61'
DF	24	(England) Reece James		(substituted on) 46'
DF	34	(England) Josh Acheampong
MF	22	(England) Kiernan Dewsbury-Hall		(substituted on) 80'
MF	39	(France) Mathis Amougou
FW	18	(France) Christopher Nkunku
FW	19	(England) Jadon Sancho	(yellow card) 85'	(substituted on) 61'
FW	32	(England) Tyrique George
FW	38	(Spain) Marc Guiu		(substituted on) 87'
Manager:
(Italy) Enzo Maresca

Man of the Match:
Cole Palmer (Chelsea)

Assistant referees:
Senad Ibrišimbegović (Bosnia and Herzegovina)
Davor Beljo (Bosnia and Herzegovina)
Fourth official:
Halil Umut Meler (Turkey)
Reserve assistant referee:
Kerem Ersoy (Turkey)
Video assistant referee:
Jérôme Brisard (France)
Assistant video assistant referee:
Willy Delajod (France)
Support video assistant referee:
Marco Di Bello (Italy)

Match rules

- 90 minutes
- 30 minutes of extra time if necessary
- Penalty shoot-out if scores still level
- Maximum of twelve named substitutes
- Maximum of five substitutions, with a sixth allowed in extra time
- Maximum of three substitution opportunities, with a fourth allowed in extra time

=== Statistics ===
First half
Statistic	Real Betis	Chelsea
Goals scored	1	0
Total shots	7	4
Shots on target	2	1
Saves	1	1
Ball possession	33%	67%
Corner kicks	3	2
Fouls committed	9	6
Offsides	0	1
Yellow cards	0	0
Red cards	0	0

Second half
Statistic	Real Betis	Chelsea
Goals scored	0	4
Total shots	6	7
Shots on target	1	6
Saves	2	1
Ball possession	40%	60%
Corner kicks	1	2
Fouls committed	7	6
Offsides	0	2
Yellow cards	2	3
Red cards	0	0

Overall
Statistic	Real Betis	Chelsea
Goals scored	1	4
Total shots	13	11
Shots on target	3	7
Saves	3	2
Ball possession	36%	64%
Corner kicks	4	4
Fouls committed	16	12
Offsides	0	3
Yellow cards	2	3
Red cards	0	0

== See also ==
- 2025 UEFA Champions League final
- 2025 UEFA Europa League final
- 2025 UEFA Women's Champions League final
- 2025 UEFA Super Cup
- Chelsea in international football
- Real Betis in European football
- 2024–25 Chelsea season
- 2024–25 Real Betis season
