= 2024–25 Real Betis season =

Real Betis
2024–25 season
- President: Ángel Haro
- Head coach: Manuel Pellegrini
- Stadium: Benito Villamarín
- La Liga: 6th
- Copa del Rey: Round of 16
- UEFA Conference League: Runners-up
- Top goalscorer: League: Isco (9); All: Isco (12)
- Highest home attendance: 58,538 (vs Sevilla, 30 March 2025)
- Lowest home attendance: 35,779 (vs HJK, 19 December 2024)
- Average home league attendance: 51,542
- Biggest win: Gévora 1–6 Real Betis
- Biggest defeat: Barcelona 5–1 Real Betis
Home colours	Away colours	Third colours

The 2024–25 season was the 118th season in the history of Real Betis, and the club's tenth consecutive season in La Liga. In addition to the domestic league, the club participated in the Copa del Rey and the UEFA Conference League, reaching the final of the latter competition.

== Players ==
=== First-team squad ===
As of 28 February 2025

Note: Flags indicate national team as defined under FIFA eligibility rules; some limited exceptions apply. Players may hold more than one non-FIFA nationality.

No.	Pos.	Nation	Player
1	GK	ESP	Fran Vieites
2	DF	ESP	Héctor Bellerín
3	DF	ESP	Diego Llorente
4	MF	USA	Johnny Cardoso
5	DF	ESP	Marc Bartra
6	DF	BRA	Natan (on loan from Napoli)
7	FW	BRA	Antony (on loan from Manchester United)
9	FW	ARG	Chimy Ávila
10	FW	MAR	Abde Ezzalzouli
11	FW	COD	Cédric Bakambu
12	DF	SUI	Ricardo Rodriguez
13	GK	ESP	Adrián
14	MF	POR	William Carvalho

No.	Pos.	Nation	Player
15	DF	FRA	Romain Perraud
16	MF	ESP	Sergi Altimira
18	MF	ESP	Pablo Fornals
19	FW	COL	Cucho Hernández
20	MF	ARG	Giovani Lo Celso
21	MF	ESP	Marc Roca
22	MF	ESP	Isco
23	DF	SEN	Youssouf Sabaly
24	FW	ESP	Aitor Ruibal (captain)
32	DF	SEN	Nobel Mendy

=== Reserve team ===
Note: Flags indicate national team as defined under FIFA eligibility rules; some limited exceptions apply. Players may hold more than one non-FIFA nationality.

No.	Pos.	Nation	Player
30	GK	ESP	Germán García
31	GK	POR	Guilherme Fernandes
33	DF	ESP	Xavi Pleguezuelo
34	MF	ESP	Carlos Guirao (on loan from Leganés B)
36	FW	ESP	Jesús Rodríguez
37	MF	ESP	Dani Pérez
40	DF	ESP	Ángel Ortiz

No.	Pos.	Nation	Player
41	GK	ESP	Manu González
42	DF	ESP	Pablo Busto
43	DF	ESP	Lucas Alcázar
46	MF	ESP	Mateo Flores
47	MF	ESP	Carlos Reina
52	FW	ESP	Pablo García
57	DF	ESP	Sergio Arribas

=== Out on loan ===
Note: Flags indicate national team as defined under FIFA eligibility rules; some limited exceptions apply. Players may hold more than one non-FIFA nationality.

No.	Pos.	Nation	Player
—	GK	POR	Rui Silva (at Sporting CP until 30 June 2025)
—	DF	COL	Keimer Sandoval (at Red Star Belgrade until 30 June 2026)
—	DF	ESP	Ricardo Visus (at Almere City until 30 June 2025)
—	DF	ESP	Álex Pérez (at Inter Milan until 30 June 2025)
—	MF	ESP	Iker Losada (at Celta Vigo until 30 June 2025)

No.	Pos.	Nation	Player
—	FW	ESP	Álex Collado (at Al-Kholood until 30 June 2025)
—	FW	ESP	Yanis Senhadji (at Hércules until 30 June 2025)
—	FW	ESP	Borja Iglesias (at Celta Vigo until 30 June 2025)
—	FW	ESP	Juanmi (at Getafe until 30 June 2025)

== Transfers ==
=== In ===
Pos.	Player	Transferred from	Fee	Date	Source
MF	(Spain) Álex Collado	(Saudi Arabia) Al-Okhdood	Loan return	30 June 2024	
FW	(Spain) Borja Iglesias	(Germany) Bayer Leverkusen	Loan return	30 June 2024	
MF	(Spain) Juanmi	(Spain) Cádiz	Loan return	30 June 2024	
DF	(Morocco) Chadi Riad	(Spain) Barcelona	€3,000,000	1 July 2024	
DF	(France) Romain Perraud	(England) Southampton	€3,500,000	1 July 2024	
MF	(Spain) Marc Roca	(England) Leeds United	€4,500,000	1 July 2024	
MF	(Spain) Iker Losada	(Spain) Racing Ferrol	€1,800,000	6 July 2024	
GK	(Spain) Adrián	(England) Liverpool	Free	7 July 2024	
DF	(Spain) Diego Llorente	(England) Leeds United	€3,250,000	9 July 2024	
DF	(Switzerland) Ricardo Rodriguez	Free agent	Free	5 August 2024	
DF	(Brazil) Natan	(Italy) Napoli	Loan	15 August 2024	
FW	(Brazil) Vitor Roque	(Spain) Barcelona	Loan	26 August 2024	
MF	(Argentina) Giovani Lo Celso	(England) Tottenham Hotspur	€5,000,000	30 August 2024	
FW	(Brazil) Antony	(England) Manchester United	Loan	25 January 2025	
FW	(Colombia) Cucho Hernández	(United States) Columbus Crew	€13,000,000	3 February 2025	

=== Out ===
Pos.	Player	Transferred to	Fee	Date	Source
DF	(Greece) Sokratis Papastathopoulos	Retired	N/A	1 July 2024	
DF	(Spain) Juan Miranda	(Italy) Bologna	End of contract	1 July 2024	
GK	(Chile) Claudio Bravo	Retired	N/A	1 July 2024	
DF	(Argentina) Guido Rodríguez	(England) West Ham United	End of contract	1 July 2024	
MF	(Spain) Rober González	(Netherlands) NEC Nijmegen	€1,200,000	1 July 2024	
MF	(Spain) Juan Cruz	(Spain) Leganés	€1,000,000	1 July 2024	
FW	(Brazil) Willian José	(Russia) Spartak Moscow	Undisclosed	1 July 2024	
DF	(Morocco) Chadi Riad	(England) Crystal Palace	€15,000,000	2 July 2024	
FW	(Spain) Yanis Senhadji	(Spain) Tenerife	Loan	2 July 2024	
DF	(Brazil) Abner	(France) Lyon	€8,000,000	5 July 2024	
FW	(Spain) Borja Iglesias	(Spain) Celta Vigo	Loan	19 July 2024	
DF	(Argentina) Germán Pezzella	(Argentina) River Plate	€4,500,000	5 August 2024	
FW	(Spain) Ayoze Pérez	(Spain) Villarreal	€4,000,000	13 August 2024	
MF	(Spain) Álex Collado	(Saudi Arabia) Al-Kholood	Loan	22 August 2024	
MF	(France) Nabil Fekir	(United Arab Emirates) Al Jazira	Undisclosed	30 August 2024	
MF	(Spain) Rodri	(Qatar) Al-Arabi	€4,000,000	8 September 2024	
MF	(Spain) Assane Diao	(Italy) Como	€12,000,000	7 January 2025	
GK	(Portugal) Rui Silva	(Portugal) Sporting CP	Loan	14 January 2025	
FW	(Spain) Iker Losada	(Spain) Celta Vigo	Loan	30 January 2025	
FW	(Spain) Juanmi	(Spain) Getafe	Loan	31 January 2025	
FW	(Brazil) Vitor Roque	(Spain) Barcelona	Loan terminated	28 February 2025	

Notes

1. ^{†} Loan transfer made permanent

=== New contracts ===
Position	Player	Date	Until	Ref.
MF	(Spain) Aitor Ruibal	11 September 2024	30 June 2028	
FW	(Morocco) Abde Ezzalzouli	30 October 2024	30 June 2029	
MF	(United States) Johnny Cardoso	4 February 2025	30 June 2030	
DF	(Spain) Marc Barta	23 April 2025	30 June 2027	

== Friendlies ==
=== Pre-season ===
The pre-season began on 8 July, with the team camping in Seefeld, Austria from 10–20 July. The pre-season concluded on 10 August. The match on 7 August was supposed to be against Raja CA, but the club was unable to travel due to internal issues.

20 July 2024 Friendly	Austria Salzburg	1–5	Real Betis	Salzburg, Austria
14:00 CEST (UTC+2)	Zottl 41'	Report	Fernández 12', 14'; García 63', 71'; Perraud 88'	Stadium: Max-Aicher-Stadion; Attendance: 700; Referee: Damir Karlic (Austria)

26 July 2024 Friendly	Liverpool	1–0	Real Betis	Pittsburgh, United States
19:30 EDT (UTC−4)	Szoboszlai 34'; Endō (yellow card) 44'; Quansah (yellow card) 49'	Report	Ruibal (yellow card) 90+3'	Stadium: Acrisure Stadium; Attendance: 42,679; Referee: Mark Allatin (United States)

31 July 2024 Snapdragon Cup	Manchester United	3–2	Real Betis	San Diego, United States
19:00 PDT (UTC−7)	Rashford 18' (pen.); Amad 24'; Casemiro 31'; Mejbri (yellow card) 90+1'; Fish (yellow card) 90+1'	Report	Losada 15'; Llorente 61'; Cardoso (yellow card) 85'	Stadium: Snapdragon Stadium; Attendance: 26,248; Referee: Alexis Da Silva (United States)

3 August 2024 Friendly	Real Betis	Cancelled	PEC Zwolle	Seville
21:00 CEST (UTC+2)				Stadium: Benito Villamarín
Note: The match was cancelled.

3 August 2024 Friendly	Real Betis	4–1	Al-Ittihad	Seville
21:00 CEST (UTC+2)	Ruibal 24'; Fekir 45'; Roca 58'; Juanmi 72'	Report	Diaby 40'	Stadium: Benito Villamarín; Attendance: 26,452; Referee: Mario Melero López

7 August 2024 Friendly	Real Betis	0–0	Cádiz	La Línea de la Concepción
20:30 CEST (UTC+2)	Alcázar (yellow card) 21'	Report	Chust (yellow card) 36'; Almagro (yellow card) 89'	Stadium: Estadio Municipal; Referee: José Palomares Gutierrez

10 August 2024 Friendly	Bayer Leverkusen	1–1 (3–1 p)	Real Betis	Leverkusen, Germany
15:30 CEST (UTC+2)	Belocian 78'	Report	Carvalho (yellow card) 43'; Juanmi 52'	Stadium: BayArena; Attendance: 28,395; Referee: Sascha Stegemann (Germany)
	Penalties
	Schick (penalty scored); Adli (penalty scored); García (penalty missed); Andrich (penalty scored)		(penalty scored) Juanmi; (penalty missed) Rodriguez; (penalty missed) Losada; (penalty missed) Rodri

== Competitions ==
=== Overall record ===
Competition	First match	Last match	Starting round	Final position	Record							
Competition	First match	Last match	Starting round	Final position	Pld	W	D	L	GF	GA	GD	Win %
La Liga	15 August 2024	23 May 2025	Matchday 1	6th	38	16	12	10	57	50	+7	42.11
Copa del Rey	31 October 2024	15 January 2025	First round	Round of 16	4	3	0	1	11	7	+4	75.00
UEFA Conference League	22 August 2024	28 May 2025	Play-off round	Runners-up	17	9	4	4	28	16	+12	52.94
Total					59	28	16	15	96	73	+23	47.46

Source: Soccerway

=== La Liga ===
==== League table ====
Pos	Team	Pld	W	D	L	GF	GA	GD	Pts	Qualification or relegation
4	Athletic Bilbao	38	19	13	6	54	29	+25	70 (Note: Athletic Bilbao finished ahead of Villarreal on head-to-head points: Athletic Bilbao 2–0 Villarreal, Villarreal 0–0 Athletic Bilbao.)	Qualification for the Champions League league stage (Note: La Liga gained an additional Champions League place as a result of Spain gaining one of the two European Performance Spots (EPS) awarded to the two associations with the highest UEFA coefficient points in 2024–25.)
5	Villarreal	38	20	10	8	71	51	+20	70	Qualification for the Champions League league stage
6	Real Betis	38	16	12	10	57	50	+7	60	Qualification for the Europa League league stage (Note: The 2024–25 Copa del Rey winner qualified for the Europa League league stage. Since the cup winners (Barcelona) qualified based on league position, the Europa League spot was passed to the seventh-placed team, and the Conference League spot was passed to the eighth-placed team.)
7	Celta Vigo	38	16	7	15	59	57	+2	55	Qualification for the Europa League league stage
8	Rayo Vallecano	38	13	13	12	41	45	−4	52 (Note: Rayo Vallecano finished ahead of Osasuna on head-to-head points: Rayo Vallecano 3–1 Osasuna, Osasuna 1–1 Rayo Vallecano.)	Qualification for the Conference League play-off round

Source: LaLiga EA Sports
Rules for classification: 1) Points; 2) Head-to-head points; 3) Head-to-head goal difference; 4) Goal difference; 5) Goals scored; 6) Fair-play points
(Note: Head-to-head record is used only after all the matches between the teams in question have been played)

==== Results summary ====
Overall								Home						Away					
Pld	W	D	L	GF	GA	GD	Pts	W	D	L	GF	GA	GD	W	D	L	GF	GA	GD
38	16	12	10	57	50	+7	60	9	7	3	32	21	+11	7	5	7	25	29	−4

Source: La Liga

==== Results by round ====
Round	1	2	4	5	3^{1}	6	7	8	9	10	11	12	13	14	15	16	17	18	19	20	21	22	23	24	25	26	27	28	29	30	31	32	33	34	35	36	37	38
Ground	H	A	A	H	H	H	A	H	A	A	H	A	H	A	A	H	A	H	A	H	A	H	A	H	A	H	H	A	H	A	H	A	H	A	H	A	A	H
Result	D	D	L	W	W	L	D	W	L	W	W	D	D	L	L	D	W	D	L	L	W	D	L	W	W	W	W	W	W	D	L	W	W	W	D	D	L	D
Position	11	11	17	14	12	11	11	8	10	7	6	7	7	9	10	11	9	9	10	12	10	10	11	8	7	6	6	6	6	6	6	6	5	6	6	6	6	6
Points	1	2	2	5	8	8	9	12	12	15	18	19	20	20	20	20	23	24	25	25	28	29	29	32	35	38	41	44	47	48	48	51	54	57	58	59	59	60

Source: La Liga
A = Away; H = Home; W = Win; D = Draw; L = Loss

Notes:

- ^{1} Matchday 3 (vs Getafe) was postponed due to Real Betis' involvement in the UEFA Conference League.

==== Matches ====
The league schedule was released on 18 June 2024.

15 August 2024 1	Real Betis	1–1	Girona	Seville
21:30 CEST (UTC+2)	Bartra 6'; Perraud (yellow card) 83'; Ruibal (yellow card) 87'	Report	Misehouy 72'	Stadium: Benito Villamarín; Attendance: 54,084; Referee: Miguel Ángel Ortiz Arias

25 August 2024 2	Alavés	0–0	Real Betis	Vitoria-Gasteiz
19:15 CEST (UTC+2)	Sedlar (yellow card) 4', (red card) 86'	Report	Juanmi (yellow card) 27'; Perraud (yellow card) 64'; Roca (yellow card) 77'; Ávila (yellow card) 89'	Stadium: Mendizorrotza; Attendance: 16,623; Referee: Mateo Busquets Ferrer

1 September 2024 4	Real Madrid	2–0	Real Betis	Madrid
21:30 CEST (UTC+2)	Vinícius (yellow card) 59'; Carvajal (yellow card) 65'; Mbappé 67', 75' (pen.)	Report		Stadium: Santiago Bernabéu; Attendance: 73,072; Referee: Javier Alberola Rojas

13 September 2024 5	Real Betis	2–0	Leganés	Seville
21:00 CEST (UTC+2)	Adrián (yellow card) 41'; Ezzalzouli 74'; Vitor Roque 86'	Report	Cruz (yellow card) 11'; Rosier (yellow card) 37'	Stadium: Benito Villamarín; Attendance: 48,089; Referee: Pablo González Fuertes

18 September 2024 3	Real Betis	2–1	Getafe	Seville
19:00 CEST (UTC+2)	Perraud (yellow card) 38'; Fornals (yellow card) 43'; Lo Celso 61' (pen.), 74'; Silva (yellow card) 88'	Report	Sola (yellow card) 12'; Aleñá (yellow card) 13'; Alderete (yellow card) 15'; Yıldırım (yellow card) 58'; Rico (yellow card) 64'; Arambarri 90+3'	Stadium: Benito Villamarín; Attendance: 48,547; Referee: Juan Luis Pulido Santana
Note: The match was originally scheduled for 28 August 2024, but was postponed due to Real Betis' participation in the UEFA Conference League.

23 September 2024 6	Real Betis	1–2	Mallorca	Seville
21:00 CEST (UTC+2)	Lo Celso 7', (yellow card) 35'; Bellerín (yellow card) 21'; Ávila (yellow card) 34'	Report	Rodríguez 8', (yellow card) 65'; Copete (yellow card) 81'; Valery 90+3'; Morey (yellow card) 90+5'	Stadium: Benito Villamarín; Attendance: 47,017; Referee: Víctor García Verdura

26 September 2024 7	Las Palmas	1–1	Real Betis	Las Palmas
18:00 WEST (UTC+1)	Moleiro 9', (yellow card) 54'; Cillessen (yellow card) 62'; Loiodice (yellow card) 70'; Benito (yellow card) 86'	Report	Lo Celso 45+3'; Roca (yellow card) 57'; Altimira (yellow card) 64'	Stadium: Estadio Gran Canaria; Attendance: 22,722; Referee: José María Sánchez Martínez

29 September 2024 8	Real Betis	1–0	Espanyol	Seville
18:30 CEST (UTC+2)	Roca (yellow card) 64'; Altimira (yellow card) 77'; Lo Celso 85'	Report	Carreras (yellow card) 26'; Romero (yellow card) 74'; Lozano (yellow card) 82'; El Hilali (yellow card) 90+6'	Stadium: Benito Villamarín; Attendance: 53,065; Referee: Alejandro Hernández Hernández

6 October 2024 9	Sevilla	1–0	Real Betis	Seville
18:30 CEST (UTC+2)	Lukebakio 50' (pen.); Gudelj (yellow card) 54'; Nianzou (yellow card) 76' (yellow-red card) 90'; Nyland (yellow card) 78'; Carmona (yellow card) 81'; Agoumé (yellow card) 84'	Report	Ezzalzouli (yellow card) 20'; Natan (yellow card) 52'; Ávila (yellow card) 83'	Stadium: Ramón Sánchez Pizjuán; Attendance: 42,571; Referee: Juan Martínez Munuera

19 October 2024 10	Osasuna	1–2	Real Betis	Pamplona
16:15 CEST (UTC+2)	Torró 59'; Boyomo (yellow card) 72'; Gómez (yellow card) 90+8'	Report	Vitor Roque 7'; Ávila 73'; Fornals (yellow card) 80'; Natan (red card) 90+5'	Stadium: El Sadar; Attendance: 21,045; Referee: Alejandro Muñiz Ruiz

27 October 2024 11	Real Betis	1–0	Atlético Madrid	Seville
18:30 CET (UTC+1)	Giménez 4' (o.g.); Perraud (yellow card) 75'; Ruibal (yellow card) 83'	Report	Mandava (yellow card) 7'; Koke (yellow card) 66'	Stadium: Benito Villamarín; Attendance: 52,621; Referee: Jesús Gil Manzano

3 November 2024 12	Athletic Bilbao	1–1	Real Betis	Bilbao
21:00 CET (UTC+1)	Berenguer 68'	Report	Fornals 52'	Stadium: San Mamés; Attendance: 46,898; Referee: Javier Alberola Rojas

10 November 2024 13	Real Betis	2–2	Celta Vigo	Seville
14:00 CET (UTC+1)	Cardoso (yellow card) 35'; Vitor Roque 40'; Natan (yellow card) 83'; Juanmi (yellow card) 90+4'; Bartra 90+5'	Report	Rodríguez 13'; Douvikas 82'	Stadium: Benito Villamarín; Attendance: 54,015; Referee: Miguel Ángel Ortiz Arias

23 November 2024 14	Valencia	4–2	Real Betis	Valencia
14:00 CET (UTC+1)	Tárrega 8', (yellow card) 90+5'; Barrenechea (yellow card) 20'; Duro 50', 53'; López 56'; Almeida (yellow card) 86'; Gayà (yellow card) 90'; Tárrega (yellow card) 90+5'	Report	Duro 14' (o.g.); Ávila 66'; Bakambu (yellow card) 88'; Sabaly (yellow card) 90'	Stadium: Mestalla; Attendance: 43,975; Referee: Ricardo de Burgos Bengoetxea

1 December 2024 15	Real Sociedad	2–0	Real Betis	San Sebastián
21:00 CET (UTC+1)	Llorente 14' (o.g.); Oyarzabal 31' (pen.), (yellow card) 45+2'; Aguerd (yellow card) 45+6'; Barrenetxea (yellow card) 47'	Report	Bartra (yellow card) 45+2'; Ávila (yellow card) 79'	Stadium: Reale Arena; Attendance: 28,119; Referee: Francisco José Hernández Maeso

7 December 2024 16	Real Betis	2–2	Barcelona	Seville
16:15 CET (UTC+1)	Flores (yellow card) 35'; Lo Celso 68' (pen.); Diao 90+4'	Report	Lewandowski 39'; De Jong (yellow card) 66'; Torres 82'; Fort (yellow card) 90'	Stadium: Benito Villamarín; Attendance: 51,749; Referee: Alejandro Muñiz Ruiz

15 December 2024 17	Villarreal	1–2	Real Betis	Villarreal
18:30 CET (UTC+1)	Gueye (yellow card) 26'; Femenía (yellow card) 39'; Baena 55', (yellow card) 60'; Pino (yellow card) 67'; Parejo (yellow card) 87'	Report	Vitor Roque 32', (yellow card) 65'; Ávila (red card) 34'; Lo Celso (yellow card) 35', (goal) 47'; Bakambu (yellow card) 36'; Ruibal (yellow card) 51'	Stadium: Estadio de la Cerámica; Attendance: 18,757; Referee: Guillermo Cuadra Fernández

22 December 2024 18	Real Betis	1–1	Rayo Vallecano	Seville
21:00 CET (UTC+1)	Isco 37' (pen.)	Report	Ciss (yellow card) 27'; García (yellow card) 36'; Palazón 51', (yellow card) 81'; Espino (yellow card) 90+4'	Stadium: Benito Villamarín; Attendance: 53,121; Referee: Víctor García Verdura

11 January 2025 19	Valladolid	1–0	Real Betis	Valladolid
16:15 CET (UTC+1)	Marcos André (yellow card) 42'; K. Pérez 58', (yellow card) 71'	Report	Llorente (yellow card) 26'; Lo Celso (yellow card) 70'; Cardoso (yellow card) 77'; Vitor Roque (yellow card) 90+12'	Stadium: José Zorrilla; Attendance: 21,911; Referee: Adrián Cordero Vega

18 January 2025 20	Real Betis	1–3	Alavés	Seville
18:30 CET (UTC+1)	J. Rodríguez 28'; Vitor Roque (yellow card) 34'; Llorente (yellow card) 37'; Perraud (red card) 55'; Isco (yellow card) 90+2'; Cardoso (yellow card) 90+4'	Report	Kike 11' (pen.), 80', 84'; Blanco (yellow card) 34'; Abqar (yellow card) 54'; Tenaglia (yellow card) 63'; Conechny (yellow card) 76'; Diarra (yellow card) 82'	Stadium: Benito Villamarín; Attendance: 50,021; Referee: Alejandro Hernández Hernández

25 January 2025 21	Mallorca	0–1	Real Betis	Palma
14:00 CET (UTC+1)	Larin (yellow card) 46'; Mascarell (yellow card) 48', (red card) 73'	Report	Ezzalzouli (yellow card) 16'; Bakambu (yellow card) 80', (goal) 90+6'	Stadium: Estadi Mallorca Son Moix; Attendance: 19,452; Referee: Javier Alberola Rojas

2 February 2025 22	Real Betis	2–2	Athletic Bilbao	Seville
21:00 CET (UTC+1)	Isco 15', (yellow card) 49'; Perraud 45+2'; Bakambu (yellow card) 61'; Roca (yellow card) 90+2'	Report	Paredes 33'; Sancet 69', (yellow card) 77'	Stadium: Benito Villamarín; Attendance: 49,292; Referee: Juan Martínez Munuera

8 February 2025 23	Celta Vigo	3–2	Real Betis	Vigo
14:00 CET (UTC+1)	Beltrán 63', (yellow card) 90+4'; Rodríguez 65'; Alonso (yellow card) 72'; Swedberg 87'; Iglesias (yellow card) 90+4'	Report	Perraud (yellow card) 8'; Antony 10', (yellow card) 68'; Llorente 22', (yellow card) 90+4'; Isco (yellow card) 61'; Vitor Roque (yellow card) 90+4'	Stadium: Balaídos; Attendance: 22,651; Referee: Mateo Busquets Ferrer

16 February 2025 24	Real Betis	3–0	Real Sociedad	Seville
21:00 CET (UTC+1)	Lo Celso (penalty missed) 33'; Antony 51'; Roca 64', 69'	Report	Aramburu (yellow card) 6'; Zubeldia (red card) 20'; Muñoz (yellow card) 31'; Becker (red card) 75'	Stadium: Benito Villamarín; Attendance: 48,758; Referee: Jesús Gil Manzano

23 February 2025 25	Getafe	1–2	Real Betis	Getafe
18:30 CET (UTC+1)	Rodríguez (yellow card) 79'; Mayoral 82'; Duarte (yellow card) 90' (yellow-red card) 90+6'	Report	Isco 18', 77' (pen.); Antony (red card) 90+4'	Stadium: Coliseum; Attendance: 13,964; Referee: Javier Alberola Rojas
Note: Antony's red card was later rescinded following an appeal by Real Betis.

1 March 2025 26	Real Betis	2–1	Real Madrid	Seville
18:30 CET (UTC+1)	Cardoso 34'; Isco 54' (pen.), (yellow card) 81'; Ávila (yellow card) 82'; Altimira (yellow card) 90'	Report	Brahim 10', (yellow card) 32'; Rüdiger (yellow card) 53'; Alaba (yellow card) 57'; Vinícius (yellow card) 86'	Stadium: Benito Villamarín; Attendance: 55,873; Referee: Alejandro Hernández Hernández

9 March 2025 27	Real Betis	1–0	Las Palmas	Seville
18:30 CET (UTC+1)	Llorente (yellow card) 19', (goal) 65'; Cardoso (yellow card) 80'; Isco (penalty missed) 90+5'	Report	Viti (yellow card) 30'; Á. Muñoz (yellow card) 38'; Bajčetić (yellow card) 39'; Essugo (yellow card) 53' (yellow-red card) 61'; Mata (yellow card) 64'; J. Muñoz (yellow card) 67'; Herzog (yellow card) 90+1'	Stadium: Benito Villamarín; Attendance: 49,292; Referee: José María Sánchez Martínez

16 March 2025 28	Leganés	2–3	Real Betis	Leganés
14:00 CET (UTC+1)	Neyou (yellow card) 26'; Raba 29', 44'; Rosier (yellow card) 65'	Report	Perraud (yellow card) 38'; Isco 64' (pen.); Bakambu 78'; Hernández 82'	Stadium: Estadio Municipal de Butarque; Attendance: 11,691; Referee: César Soto Grado

30 March 2025 29	Real Betis	2–1	Sevilla	Seville
21:00 CEST (UTC+2)	Cardoso 25'; Adrián (yellow card) 36'; Hernández 45+3'; Isco (yellow card) 56'; Lo Celso (yellow card) 90+1'	Report	Vargas 17'; Carmona (yellow card) 36'; Badé (yellow card) 86'; Saúl (yellow card) 90+5'	Stadium: Benito Villamarín; Attendance: 58,538; Referee: Mateo Busquets Ferrer

5 April 2025 30	Barcelona	1–1	Real Betis	Barcelona
21:00 CEST (UTC+2)	Gavi 7'; García (yellow card) 77'; Koundé (yellow card) 87'	Report	Natan (yellow card) 14', (goal) 17'	Stadium: Lluís Companys Olympic Stadium; Attendance: 47,043; Referee: Jesús Gil Manzano

13 April 2025 31	Real Betis	1–2	Villarreal	Seville
18:30 CEST (UTC+2)	Ruibal 3'	Report	Foyth (yellow card) 8'; Barry (yellow card) 12', (goal) 26'; Pérez 48'; Luiz Júnior (yellow card) 52'; Cardona (yellow card) 86'	Stadium: Benito Villamarín; Attendance: 54,778; Referee: Juan Luis Pulido Santana

21 April 2025 32	Girona	1–3	Real Betis	Girona
21:00 CEST (UTC+2)	Arthur (yellow card) 52'; Francés (yellow card) 65'; Stuani 85'; López (yellow card) 90+3'	Report	Cardoso 6'; Ruibal (yellow card) 26'; Antony 39'; Isco 42'; Perraud (yellow card) 90+1'	Stadium: Montilivi; Attendance: 12,535; Referee: Alejandro Hernández Hernández

24 April 2025 33	Real Betis	5–1	Valladolid	Seville
21:30 CEST (UTC+2)	J. Rodríguez 17'; Hernández 64'; Isco 66'; Ruibal (yellow card) 72'; Perraud 84'; Ezzalzouli 90'	Report	Chuki 41'	Stadium: Benito Villamarín; Attendance: 46,458; Referee: Francisco José Hernández Maeso

4 May 2025 34	Espanyol	1–2	Real Betis	Cornellà de Llobregat
18:30 CEST (UTC+2)	Fernández 28'; El Hilali (yellow card) 35'; Romero (yellow card) 52'	Report	Lo Celso 85'; Antony 90+1'	Stadium: RCDE Stadium; Attendance: 29,126; Referee: Guillermo Cuadra Fernández

11 May 2025 35	Real Betis	1–1	Osasuna	Seville
21:00 CEST (UTC+2)	Perraud (yellow card) 23'; Hernández 64'; Altimira (yellow card) 77'; Antony (yellow card) 90+5'	Report	Catena (yellow card) 9'; Budimir (yellow card) 45+1', (goal) 75'	Stadium: Benito Villamarín; Attendance: 52,839; Referee: Miguel Ángel Ortiz Arias

15 May 2025 36	Rayo Vallecano	2–2	Real Betis	Madrid
19:00 CEST (UTC+2)	Balliu (yellow card) 9'; De Frutos 37'; Lejeune 45+6'	Report	Bartra (yellow card) 45+5'; Hernández 51'; Natan (yellow card) 53'; Isco 61' (pen.); Carvalho (yellow card) 88'	Stadium: Vallecas; Attendance: 13,480; Referee: Pablo González Fuertes

18 May 2025 37	Atlético Madrid	4–1	Real Betis	Madrid
19:00 CEST (UTC+2)	Alvarez 10', 75'; Le Normand 45+3'; Molina (yellow card) 90+3'; Correa 90+6'	Report	Fornals 67'; Mendy (yellow card) 89'	Stadium: Riyadh Air Metropolitano; Attendance: 62,269; Referee: Adrián Cordero Vega

23 May 2025 38	Real Betis	1–1	Valencia	Seville
21:00 CEST (UTC+2)	Antony 40'; Natan (yellow card) 90+3'	Report	Tárrega (yellow card) 59'; Mir 75', (yellow card) 83'; Duro (yellow card) 90+4'	Stadium: Benito Villamarín; Attendance: 51,141; Referee: Victor García Verdura

=== Copa del Rey ===
31 October 2024 First round	Gévora	1–6	Real Betis	Almendralejo
21:00 CET (UTC+1)	Rodríguez (yellow card) 43'; Juanma 90+1' (pen.)	Report	Altimira 6'; Diao 26'; Bakambu 28', (yellow card) 59'; Juanmi 68'; R. Rodriguez (yellow card) 73'; Vitor Roque 79', 87'; Perraud (yellow card) 90+1'	Stadium: Estadio Francisco de la Hera; Attendance: 8,724; Referee: José María Sánchez Martínez
Note: The match was played at the Estadio Francisco de la Hera in Almendralejo, instead of Gévora's regular stadium, the Municipal de Gévora in Gévora, as it did not meet the broadcasting requirements.

4 December 2024 Second round	Sant Andreu	1–3	Real Betis	Barcelona
19:00 CET (UTC+1)	Torices (yellow card) 30'; Serrano 36'; Torres (yellow card) 78'; Torreguitart (yellow card) 80'	Report	Ruibal (yellow card) 11'; Ávila 26', (yellow card) 66'; Juanmi (yellow card) 78'; Vitor Roque (penalty missed) 79'; Bartra 79'; Sabaly (yellow card) 86'; Vieites (yellow card) 90'; Ezzalzouli 90+6'	Stadium: Narcís Sala; Attendance: 6,563; Referee: Mateo Busquets Ferrer

4 January 2025 Round of 32	Huesca	0–1	Real Betis	Huesca
15:30 CET (UTC+1)	Pulido (yellow card) 70'; Hernández (yellow card) 73'; Soko (yellow card) 90+5'	Report	Isco 38'	Stadium: El Alcoraz; Attendance: 7,500; Referee: Miguel Ángel Ortiz Arias

15 January 2025 Round of 16	Barcelona	5–1	Real Betis	Barcelona
21:00 CET (UTC+1)	Gavi 3', (yellow card) 63'; Koundé 27'; Raphinha (yellow card) 50', (goal) 58'; Torres 67'; Yamal 75'	Report	Bartra (yellow card) 42'; Vitor Roque 84' (pen.); Flores (yellow card) 86'	Stadium: Estadi Olímpic Lluís Companys; Attendance: 46,019; Referee: José María Sánchez Martínez

=== UEFA Conference League ===
==== Play-off round ====
The draw for the play-off round was held on 5 August 2024.

22 August 2024 First leg	Kryvbas Kryvyi Rih (Ukraine)	0–2	(Spain) Real Betis	Košice, Slovakia
20:00 CEST (UTC+2)	Adu (yellow card) 43'	Report	Ávila 13'; Ezzalzouli (yellow card) 33'; Rodri 62'	Stadium: Košická futbalová aréna Attendance: 4,372; Referee: Arda Kardeşler (Turkey)
Note: Due to the Russian invasion of Ukraine, Kryvbas Kryvyi Rih were required to play their home match at a neutral venue.

29 August 2024 Second leg	Real Betis (Spain)	3–0 (5–0 agg.)	(Ukraine) Kryvbas Kryvyi Rih	Seville
21:00 CEST (UTC+2)	Ruibal 40'; Ezzalzouli 41', 43'	Report		Stadium: Benito Villamarín; Attendance: 41,445; Referee: Igor Pajac (Croatia)

==== League phase ====
The draw for the league phase was held on 30 August 2024.

Pos	Team	Pld	W	D	L	GF	GA	GD	Pts	Qualification
13	(Hellenic Football Federation) Panathinaikos	6	3	1	2	10	7	+3	10	Advance to knockout phase play-offs (seeded)
14	(Football Association of Slovenia) Olimpija Ljubljana	6	3	1	2	7	6	+1	10	Advance to knockout phase play-offs (seeded)
15	(Royal Spanish Football Federation) Real Betis	6	3	1	2	6	5	+1	10	Advance to knockout phase play-offs (seeded)
16	(German Football Association) 1. FC Heidenheim	6	3	1	2	7	7	0	10	Advance to knockout phase play-offs (seeded)
17	(Royal Belgian Football Association) Gent	6	3	0	3	8	8	0	9	Advance to knockout phase play-offs (unseeded)

Source: UEFA
Rules for classification: League phase tiebreakers

Round	1	2	3	4	5	6
Ground	A	H	H	A	A	H
Result	L	D	W	L	W	W
Position	26	27	18	22	17	15
Points	0	1	4	4	7	10

Source: UEFA
A = Away; H = Home; W = Win; D = Draw; L = Loss

3 October 2024 1	Legia Warsaw (Poland)	1–0	(Spain) Real Betis	Warsaw, Poland
18:45 CEST (UTC+2)	Kapuadi 23', (yellow card) 88'; Luquinhas (yellow card) 26'; Oyedele (yellow card) 76'; Wszołek (yellow card) 79'	Report	Cardoso (yellow card) 61'; Ruibal (yellow card) 80'; Natan (yellow card) 90+2'; Perraud (yellow card) 90+3'	Stadium: Polish Army Stadium; Attendance: 25,385; Referee: Luca Pairetto (Italy)

24 October 2024 2	Real Betis (Spain)	1–1	(Denmark) Copenhagen	Seville
21:00 CEST (UTC+2)	Ezzalzouli 8'; Ruibal (yellow card) 37'; Ávila (yellow card) 76'; Fornals (yellow card) 77'	Report	Elyounoussi (yellow card) 32'; Diks 77' (pen.), (yellow card) 86'; Achouri (yellow card) 82'	Stadium: Benito Villamarín; Attendance: 45,702; Referee: Willy Delajod (France)

7 November 2024 3	Real Betis (Spain)	2–1	(Slovenia) Celje	Seville
21:00 CET (UTC+1)	Natan 75'; Juanmi 90+4'	Report	Karničnik (yellow card) 35'; Kučys (yellow card) 49'; Nieto (yellow card) 54', (goal) 81'; Štubljar (yellow card) 90+1'	Stadium: Benito Villamarín; Attendance: 37,618; Referee: Novak Simović (Serbia)

28 November 2024 4	Mladá Boleslav (Czech Republic)	2–1	(Spain) Real Betis	Mladá Boleslav, Czech Republic
21:00 CET (UTC+1)	Suchý (yellow card) 16'; Mareček (yellow card) 45+1'; Vojta 51'; Vydra 54'	Report	Lo Celso 17', (red card) 89'; Natan (yellow card) 64'; Llorente (yellow card) 67'	Stadium: Lokotrans Aréna; Attendance: 3,960; Referee: Daniel Schlager (Germany)

12 December 2024 5	Petrocub Hîncești (Moldova)	0–1	(Spain) Real Betis	Chișinău, Moldova
19:45 EET (UTC+2)	Demian (yellow card) 14'; Lungu (yellow card) 53'	Report	Bakambu 54'; Ezzalzouli (yellow card) 75'	Stadium: Zimbru Stadium; Attendance: 5,354; Referee: Lothar D'hondt (Belgium)
Note: The match was played at Zimbru Stadium in Chișinău, instead of Petrocub Hîncești's regular stadium, Stadionul Municipal in Hîncești, which did not meet UEFA requirements.

19 December 2024 6	Real Betis (Spain)	1–0	(Finland) HJK	Seville
21:00 CET (UTC+1)	Cardoso 27'; Ruibal (yellow card) 38'	Report	Hostikka (yellow card) 55'; Kanellopoulos (yellow card) 84'; Bandé (yellow card) 90+2'	Stadium: Benito Villamarín; Attendance: 35,779; Referee: Patrik Kolarić (Croatia)

==== Knockout phase ====
===== Knockout phase play-offs =====
The draw for the knockout phase play-offs was held on 20 December 2024.

13 February 2025 First leg	Gent (Belgium)	0–3	(Spain) Real Betis	Ghent, Belgium
21:00 CET (UTC+1)	Vanzeir (yellow card) 61'	Report	Sabaly (yellow card) 14'; Antony 47'; Bakambu 72'; Altimira 84'	Stadium: Planet Group Arena; Attendance: 11,051; Referee: Horațiu Feșnic (Romania)

20 February 2025 Second leg	Real Betis (Spain)	0–1 (3–1 agg.)	(Belgium) Gent	Seville
18:45 CET (UTC+1)	Ávila (yellow card) 23'; Vitor Roque (red card) 82'	Report	Lopes (yellow card) 40'; Brown 87'	Stadium: Benito Villamarín; Attendance: 51,510; Referee: Damian Sylwestrzak (Poland)

===== Round of 16 =====
The draw for the round of 16 was held on 21 February 2025.

6 March 2025 First leg	Real Betis (Spain)	2–2	(Portugal) Vitória de Guimarães	Seville
18:45 CET (UTC+1)	Bakambu 48'; Ruibal (yellow card) 54'; Isco 75', (yellow card) 86'; Antony (yellow card) 81'; Ávila (yellow card) 90+5'	Report	Mendes 51'; Oliveira 81'	Stadium: Benito Villamarín; Attendance: 44,366; Referee: Nikola Dabanović (Montenegro)

13 March 2025 Second leg	Vitória de Guimarães (Portugal)	0–4 (2–6 agg.)	(Spain) Real Betis	Guimarães, Portugal
20:00 WET (UTC+0)	Embaló (yellow card) 43'; Oliveira (yellow card) 45+1'; T. Silva (yellow card) 49'; Mendes (yellow card) 70'; Maga (yellow card) 78'	Report	Bakambu 5', 20'; Altimira (yellow card) 41'; Llorente (yellow card) 45+1'; Antony 58'; Isco 80'	Stadium: Estádio D. Afonso Henriques; Attendance: 28,994; Referee: Serdar Gözübüyük (Netherlands)

===== Quarter-finals =====
The draw for the order of the quarter-final legs was held on 21 February 2025, after the draw for the round of 16.

10 April 2025 First leg	Real Betis (Spain)	2–0	(Poland) Jagiellonia Białystok	Seville
21:00 CEST (UTC+2)	Isco (yellow card) 17'; Bakambu 24'; J. Rodríguez 45+2'	Report	Villar (yellow card) 17'; Romanczuk (yellow card) 90+2'	Stadium: Benito Villamarín; Attendance: 56,442; Referee: Anthony Taylor (England)

17 April 2025 Second leg	Jagiellonia Białystok (Poland)	1–1 (1–3 agg.)	(Spain) Real Betis	Białystok, Poland
18:45 CEST (UTC+2)	Imaz (yellow card) 44'; Churlinov 81', (yellow card) 82'; Silva (yellow card) 90+3'	Report	Antony (yellow card) 39'; Sabaly (yellow card) 65'; Bakambu 78'	Stadium: Białystok City Stadium; Attendance: 20,003; Referee: Clément Turpin (France)

===== Semi-finals =====
The draw for the order of the semi-final legs was held on 21 February 2025, after the draw for the round of 16 and quarter-finals.

1 May 2025 First leg	Real Betis (Spain)	2–1	(Italy) Fiorentina	Seville
21:00 CEST (UTC+2)	Bakambu (yellow card) 6'; Ezzalzouli 6'; Antony 64'; Perraud (yellow card) 73'	Report	Parisi (yellow card) 64'; Ranieri 73'; Folorunsho (yellow card) 73'; Adli (yellow card) 84'; Mandragora (yellow card) 90+5'	Stadium: Benito Villamarín; Attendance: 56,417; Referee: Michael Oliver (England)

8 May 2025 Second leg	Fiorentina (Italy)	2–2 (a.e.t.) (3–4 agg.)	(Spain) Real Betis	Florence, Italy
21:00 CEST (UTC+2)	Gosens 34', 42'; Dodô (yellow card) 43'; Richardson (yellow card) 77'; Pongračić (yellow card) 77'; Kean (yellow card) 84'; Fagioli (yellow card) 87'; Ranieri (yellow card) 99'; Folorunsho (yellow card) 110'	Report	Antony 30'; Fornals (yellow card) 43'; Natan (yellow card) 84'; Ezzalzouli 97'; Ruibal (yellow card) 99'; Vieites (yellow card) 120+3'	Stadium: Stadio Artemio Franchi; Attendance: 21,252; Referee: Glenn Nyberg (Sweden)

===== Final =====
28 May 2025 Final	Real Betis (Spain)	1–4	(England) Chelsea	Wrocław, Poland
21:00 CEST (UTC+2)	Ezzalzouli 9'; Antony (yellow card) 88'; Perraud (yellow card) 90+5'	Report	Badiashile (yellow card) 55'; Fernández 65'; Jackson 70'; Palmer (yellow card) 79'; Sancho 83', (yellow card) 85'; Caicedo 90+1'	Stadium: Wrocław Stadium; Attendance: 39,754; Referee: Irfan Peljto (Bosnia and Herzegovina)

== Statistics ==
=== Appearances and goals ===
Last updated 23 November 2024.

No.	Pos	Nat	Player	Total		La Liga		Copa del Rey		UEFA Conference League	
No.	Pos	Nat	Player	Apps	Goals	Apps	Goals	Apps	Goals	Apps	Goals
Goalkeepers
1	GK	(Portugal) POR	Rui Silva	16	0	14	0	0	0	2	0
13	GK	(Spain) ESP	Adrián	22	0	16	0	0	0	6	0
25	GK	(Spain) ESP	Fran Vieites	8	0	4	0	4	0	0	0
Defenders
2	DF	(Spain) ESP	Héctor Bellerín	11	0	6+3	0	0	0	0+2	0
3	DF	(Spain) ESP	Diego Llorente	40	2	29+1	2	1+1	0	7+1	0
5	DF	(Spain) ESP	Marc Bartra	36	3	23+2	2	2	1	7+2	0
6	DF	(Brazil) BRA	Natan	49	2	23+8	1	4	0	13+1	1
12	DF	(Switzerland) SUI	Ricardo Rodriguez	30	0	15+3	0	3	0	9	0
15	DF	(France) FRA	Romain Perraud	38	2	22+6	2	2+1	0	5+2	0
23	DF	(Senegal) SEN	Youssouf Sabaly	33	0	20+2	0	2+2	0	6+1	0
32	DF	(Senegal) SEN	Nobel Mendy	5	0	1+1	0	1	0	1+1	0
Midfielders
4	MF	(United States) USA	Johnny Cardoso	43	4	24+4	3	2+1	0	9+3	1
14	MF	(Portugal) POR	William Carvalho	15	0	6+8	0	0	0	0+1	0
16	MF	(Spain) ESP	Sergi Altimira	50	2	22+10	0	3+1	1	8+6	1
18	MF	(Spain) ESP	Pablo Fornals	36	2	22+4	2	0+1	0	8+1	0
20	MF	(Argentina) ARG	Giovani Lo Celso	33	9	15+10	8	2	0	4+2	1
21	MF	(Spain) ESP	Marc Roca	16	2	11+3	2	0	0	1+1	0
22	MF	(Spain) ESP	Isco	32	12	17+5	9	2	1	6+2	2
34	MF	(Spain) ESP	Carlos Guirao	3	0	2	0	0+1	0	0	0
37	MF	(Spain) ESP	Dani Pérez	2	0	0	0	0	0	0+2	0
46	MF	(Spain) ESP	Mateo Flores	17	0	1+5	0	1+3	0	3+4	0
Forwards
7	FW	(Brazil) BRA	Antony	25	9	15+2	5	0	0	8	4
9	FW	(Argentina) ARG	Chimy Ávila	31	3	6+13	2	1+1	1	7+3	0
10	FW	(Morocco) MAR	Abde Ezzalzouli	46	6	23+9	2	1+1	1	5+7	3
11	FW	(Democratic Republic of the Congo) COD	Cédric Bakambu	41	10	6+19	2	2+1	1	11+2	7
19	FW	(Colombia) COL	Cucho Hernández	15	5	14+1	5	0	0	0	0
24	FW	(Spain) ESP	Aitor Ruibal	43	2	13+16	1	2	0	8+4	1
36	FW	(Spain) ESP	Jesús Rodríguez	31	3	15+6	2	2+1	0	5+2	1
38	FW	(Spain) ESP	Assane Diao	17	2	2+8	1	1	1	4+2	0
Players who transferred out during the season
	MF	(Spain) ESP	Rodri	5	1	1+2	0	0	0	2	1
	MF	(France) FRA	Nabil Fekir	3	0	2	0	0	0	1	0
	FW	(Spain) ESP	Juanmi	13	2	2+5	0	1	1	2+3	1
	FW	(Brazil) BRA	Vitor Roque	33	7	14+8	4	2+2	3	3+4	0
	MF	(Spain) ESP	Iker Losada	15	0	3+7	0	2+1	0	1+1	0

=== Goalscorers ===
Position	Players	La Liga	Copa del Rey	Conference League	Total
MF	(Spain) Isco	9	1	2	12
FW	(Democratic Republic of the Congo) Cédric Bakambu	2	1	7	10
MF	(Brazil) Antony	5	0	4	9
MF	(Argentina) Giovani Lo Celso	8	0	1	9
MF	(Morocco) Abdessamad Ezzalzouli	2	1	4	7
FW	(Brazil) Vitor Roque	4	3	0	7
FW	(Colombia) Cucho Hernández	5	0	0	5
MF	(United States) Johnny Cardoso	3	0	1	4
MF	(Spain) Jesús Rodríguez	2	1	1	4
DF	(Spain) Marc Bartra	2	1	0	3
FW	(Argentina) Chimy Ávila	2	1	0	3
DF	(Brazil) Natan	1	1	1	3
MF	(Spain) Sergi Altimira	0	1	1	2
FW	(Senegal) Assane Diao	1	1	0	2
MF	(Spain) Pablo Fornals	2	0	0	2
DF	(Spain) Diego Llorente	2	0	0	2
DF	(France) Romain Perraud	2	0	0	2
MF	(Spain) Marc Roca	2	0	0	2
MF	(Spain) Mateo Flores	0	1	0	1
FW	(Spain) Juanmi	0	0	1	1
MF	(Spain) Iker Losada	0	1	0	1
DF	(Switzerland) Ricardo Rodriguez	0	1	0	1
DF	(Spain) Aitor Ruibal	1	0	0	1
