= Carlos Guirao =

Carlos Guirao may refer to:

- Carlos Guirao (footballer), Spanish footballer
- Carlos Guirao (musician), Spanish musician and composer

== See also ==
- Guirao, a surname
