= Mateo Flores =

Mateo Flores may refer to:

- Mateo Flores (footballer) (born 2004), Spanish football midfielder
- Mateo Flores (runner) (1922–2011), Guatemalan long-distance runner
