= Guirao =

Guirao is a surname. Notable people with the surname include:

- Carlos Guirao (footballer) (born 2003), Spanish footballer
- Carlos Guirao (musician) (1954–2012), Spanish musician
- José Guirao (1959–2022), Spanish cultural manager, art expert and former minister of culture
- Miguel Guirao (born 1996), Spanish footballer
- Olga Guirao (born 1956), Spanish novelist
- Rodrigo Guirao Díaz (born 1980), Argentine actor
