= Iván Corralejo =

Spanish footballer (born 2007)

Personal information
- Full name: Iván Corralejo Mantero
- Date of birth: 1 May 2007 (age 19)
- Place of birth: Valverde del Camino, Spain
- Height: 1.76 m (5 ft 9 in)
- Position: Midfielder

Team information
- Current team: Betis B
- Number: 37

Youth career
- 2016–2026: Betis

Senior career*
Years	Team	Apps	(Gls)
2023–	Betis B	19	(2)
2026–	Betis	1	(0)

International career^{‡}
2023	Spain U16	3	(0)
2023	Spain U17	3	(0)
2025–	Spain U19	1	(1)
- * Club domestic league appearances and goals as of 10 June 2026 ‡ National team caps and goals as of 8 September 2025

Iván Corralejo Mantero (born 1 May 2007) is a Spanish professional footballer who plays as a midfielder for Betis Deportivo.

== Club career ==
Born in Valverde del Camino, Huelva, Andalusia, Corralejo joined Real Betis' youth sides at the age of nine. He signed his first professional contract with the club on 10 May 2023, and made his senior debut with the reserves on 19 November, coming on as a late substitute for Lucas Alcázar in a 1–0 Segunda Federación away loss to FC La Unión Atlético.

Corralejo made his first team debut on 31 October 2025, replacing Marc Roca in a 7–1 away routing of Atlético Palma del Río CF, for the season's Copa del Rey. On 24 November 2025, he renewed his link until 2028, and scored his first senior goal the following 4 January, netting the B's opener in a 2–2 home draw against CE Europa.

Corralejo made his professional – and La Liga – debut on 25 January 2026, replacing Cédric Bakambu in a 2–1 away loss to Deportivo Alavés.

== International career ==
Corralejo represented Spain at under-16, under-17 and under-19 levels.
