= Miguel Guirao =

Spanish footballer

Personal information
- Full name: Miguel Guirao Cano
- Date of birth: 5 February 1996 (age 30)
- Place of birth: Murcia, Spain
- Height: 1.81 m (5 ft 11 1/2 in)
- Position: Winger

Youth career
- 2004–2014: Murcia
- 2014–2015: Almería

Senior career*
Years	Team	Apps	(Gls)
2012	Murcia	1	(0)
2015–2020	Almería B	49	(1)
2016–2017	→ Cartagena (loan)	0	(0)
2017–2018	→ Jumilla (loan)	7	(0)
2018	→ Lorca Deportiva (loan)	3	(0)
2020–2021	Mar Menor	24	(1)
2021	Ciudad Lucena	0	(0)
2021–2022	Cartagena B	34	(1)
2022–2023	Atlético Pulpileño	23	(0)
2023–2024	El Palmar	22	(2)

International career^{‡}
2013	Spain U17	1	(0)
- * Club domestic league appearances and goals as of 12 May 2024 ‡ National team caps and goals as of 23 January 2013

Miguel Guirao Cano (born 5 February 1996) is a Spanish footballer. Mainly a left winger, he can also play as a left back.

== Club career ==
Born in Murcia, Guirao started his youth career with his local club, Real Murcia. On 15 December 2012, aged only 16, he made his professional debut by coming on as a late substitute for Jorge García in a 0–1 Segunda División home loss against CD Guadalajara; he was the second youngest player to debut for the club.

On 24 August 2014 Guirao terminated his contract and returned to youth football with UD Almería. On 14 July of the following year he was promoted to the reserves, playing in the Segunda División B.

On 6 July 2016, Guirao was loaned to another third-tier club, FC Cartagena, for a year. However, he spent the whole campaign sidelined due to knee injuries.

On 28 July 2017, Guirao joined FC Jumilla, also in a temporary deal. The following 31 January, after being sparingly used, he moved to fellow third-tier side CF Lorca Deportiva, also on loan.
