= Sergio Arribas (footballer, born 2003) =

Spanish footballer (born 2004)

Personal information
- Full name: Sergio Arribas Prieto
- Date of birth: 10 February 2003 (age 23)
- Place of birth: Burgos, Spain
- Height: 1.85 m (6 ft 1 in)
- Position: Centre-back

Team information
- Current team: Cádiz
- Number: 38

Youth career
- 2018–2021: Burgos
- 2021–2022: Rayo Vallecano

Senior career*
Years	Team	Apps	(Gls)
2022–2024	Rayo Vallecano B	48	(0)
2024–2025	Betis B	29	(0)
2025–2026	Betis	1	(0)
2025–2026	→ Huesca (loan)	12	(0)
2026–	Cádiz	8	(1)
- * Club domestic league appearances and goals as of 9 June 2026

Sergio Arribas Prieto (born 10 February 2003) is a Spanish professional footballer who plays for Cádiz CF. Mainly a centre-back, he can also play as a left-back.

== Career ==
Born in Burgos, Castile and León, Arribas joined Rayo Vallecano's youth sides in July 2021, from hometown side Burgos CF. He was promoted to their reserves in Tercera Federación in 2022, and established himself as a starter during the 2022–23 season.

On 7 July 2024, Arribas joined Real Betis on a two-year deal, and was initially assigned to the B-team in Primera Federación. He made his first team – and La Liga – debut the following 25 January, starting in a 1–0 away win over RCD Mallorca.

On 7 July 2025, Arribas renewed his contract with the Verdiblancos until 2028, and moved to Segunda División side SD Huesca on a one-year loan deal. On 29 January of the following year, he moved to fellow league team Cádiz CF on a three-and-a-half-year contract.

== Career statistics ==
As of match played 31 May 2026

Appearances and goals by club, season and competition
Club	Season	League			Cup		Europe		Other		Total	
Club	Season	Division	Apps	Goals	Apps	Goals	Apps	Goals	Apps	Goals	Apps	Goals
Rayo Vallecano B	2022–23	Tercera Federación	19	0	—		—		—		19	0
Rayo Vallecano B	2023–24	Tercera Federación	29	0	—		—		—		29	0
Rayo Vallecano B	Total		48	0	—		—		—		48	0
Betis B	2024–25	Primera Federación	18	0	—		—		—		18	0
Betis	2024–25	La Liga	1	0	—		0	0	—		1	0
Huesca (loan)	2025–26	Segunda División	12	0	3	1	—		—		15	1
Cádiz	2025–26	Segunda División	8	1	—		—		—		8	1
Career total	2025–26		87	1	3	1	0	0	0	0	90	2
