= Adrián (footballer) =

Spanish footballer (born 1987)

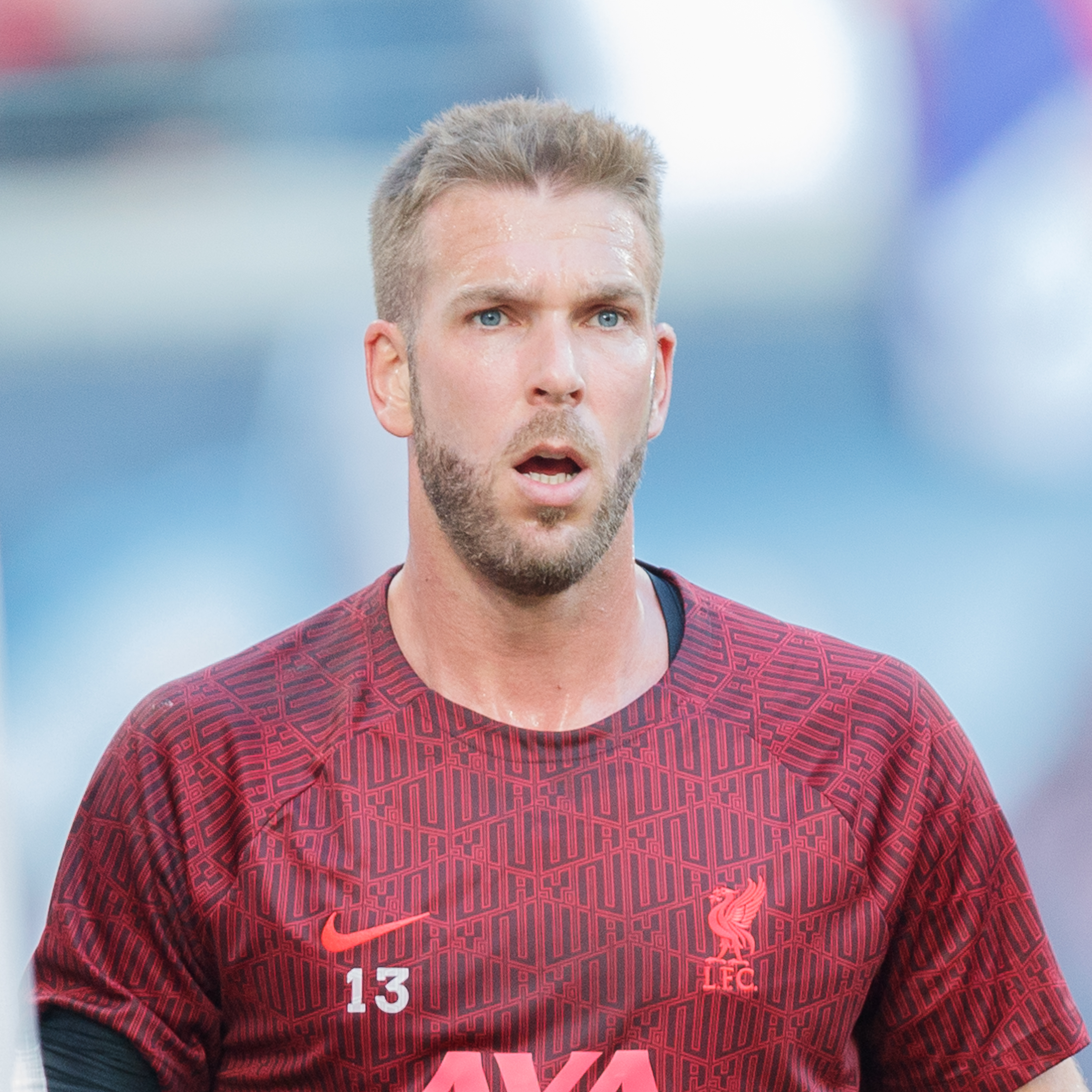
- Adrián warming up for Liverpool in 2022

Personal information
- Full name: Adrián San Miguel del Castillo
- Date of birth: 3 January 1987 (age 39)
- Place of birth: Seville, Spain
- Height: 1.90 m (6 ft 3 in)
- Position: Goalkeeper

Youth career
- Altair
- 1998–2006: Betis

Senior career*
Years	Team	Apps	(Gls)
2006–2008	Betis C	23	(0)
2007–2012	Betis B	62	(0)
2008	→ Alcalá (loan)	5	(0)
2009	→ Utrera (loan)	13	(0)
2012–2013	Betis	32	(0)
2013–2019	West Ham United	125	(0)
2019–2024	Liverpool	14	(0)
2024–2026	Betis	20	(0)
Total		294	(0)

International career
2013	Andalusia	1	(0)
- * Club domestic league appearances and goals

Adrián San Miguel del Castillo (born 3 January 1987), known simply as Adrián, is a Spanish former professional footballer who played as a goalkeeper.

Adrián began his career playing with Spanish side Real Betis, initially with the club's youth sides, before making his debut with the first team in 2012; he also had spells on loan with Alcalá and Utrera during this period. In 2013, he moved to England, joining West Ham United. After his release from West Ham, he signed with Liverpool in 2019, winning a Premier League title in his first season.

== Club career ==
=== Betis ===
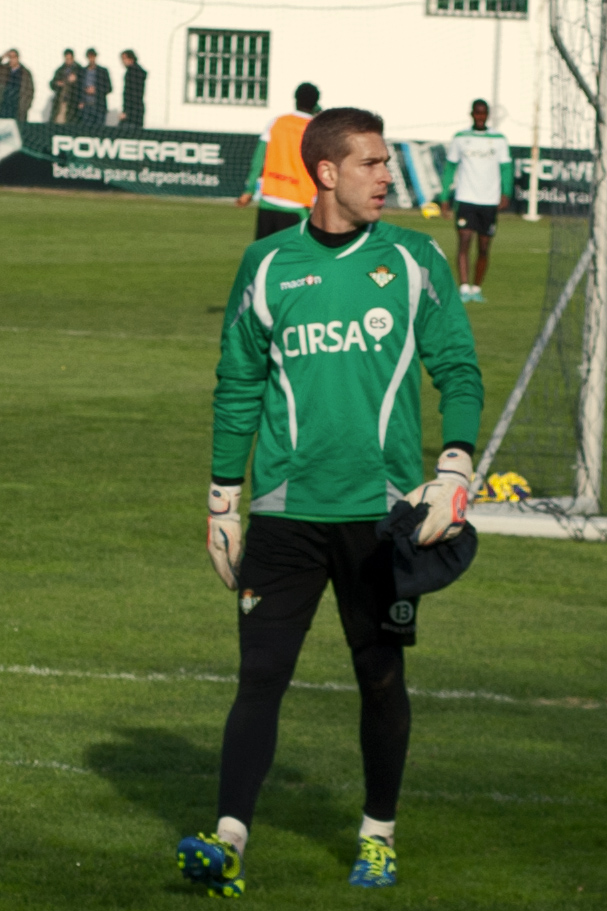
Adrián training with Real Betis in 2013

Born in Seville, Andalusia, Adrián played as a striker and a winger for CD Altair until age ten, when the previous goalkeeper left and he changed position to that of goalkeeper. He later signed for Real Betis, where he finished his formation.

Adrián spent his first two seasons with the C-team and a further five with the reserves, with all five seasons with the reserves coming in the Segunda División B, successively backing up René and Brimah Razak. He was also loaned to Alcalá in 2008 and Utrera in 2009. He was promoted to the first team for 2011–12 as third-choice – still continuing to appear for the B's – but suffered a severe injury to his cruciate ligaments in November that kept him out of action for five-and-a-half months.

Adrián made his La Liga debut on 29 September 2012 in a 0–4 away loss against Málaga. After Casto was sent off in the early minutes, he replaced out-field player Salvador Agra and went on to be named man of the match. Still in the 2012–13 campaign, he became the starter, namely putting in a man of the match performance in a 1–0 home win against Real Madrid on 24 November. Following his debut, he went on to start the next 31 matches, keeping 11 clean sheets as the club finished in seventh place and qualified for the UEFA Europa League.

=== West Ham United ===
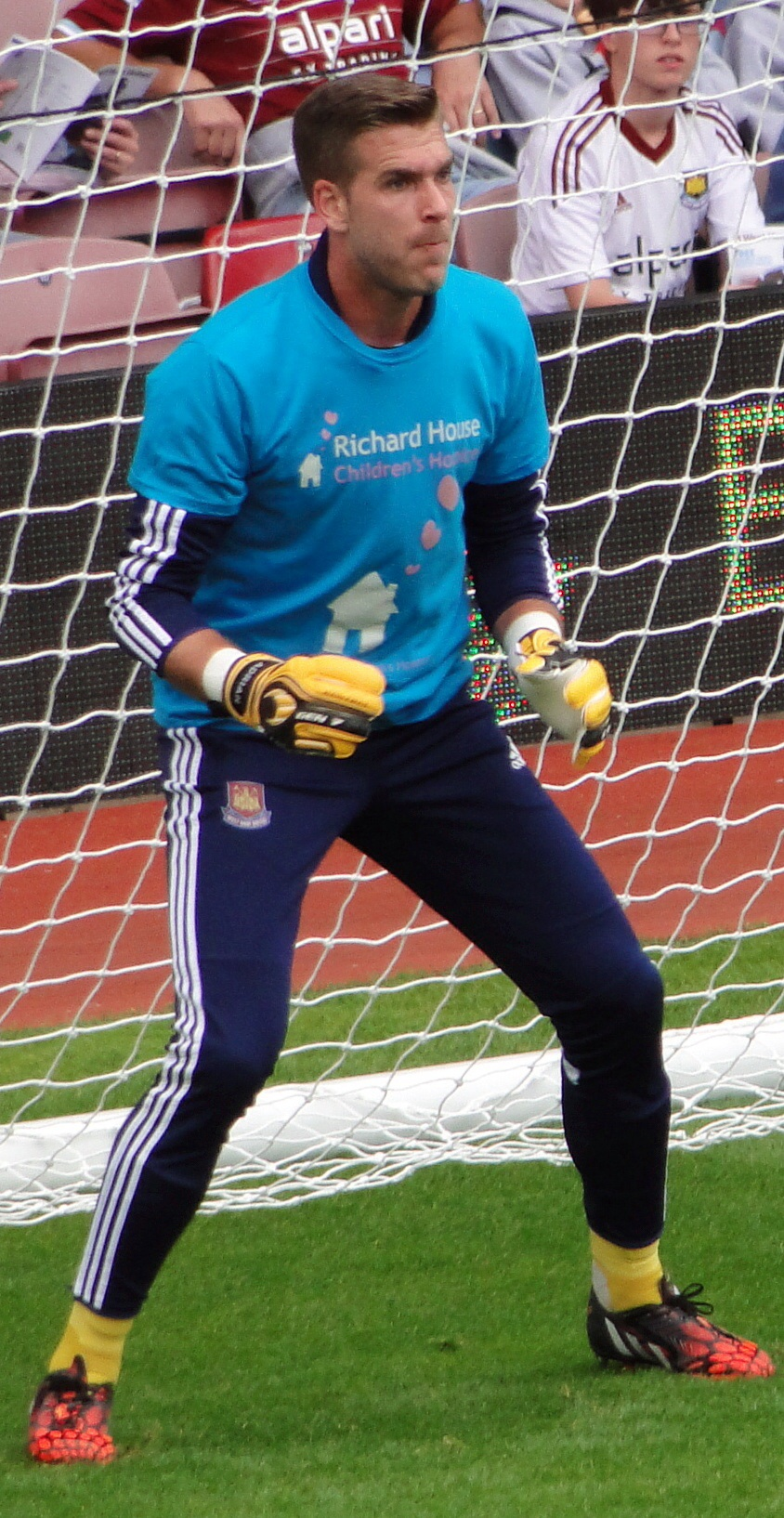
Adrián warming up for West Ham United in 2014

Having been watched playing for Betis by West Ham United manager Sam Allardyce and goalkeeping coach Martyn Margetson, Adrián was persuaded to join the club. On 5 June 2013, it was announced he would sign a three-year contract on 1 July, with the Premier League club having the option to extend this deal for a further two seasons.

Adrián made his Hammers debut on 27 August 2013 in a 2–1 home win against Cheltenham Town for the season's League Cup. During the match, he fouled Jermaine McGlashan to concede a penalty, which Matt Richards converted. His first league appearance came on 21 December, a 1–3 loss at Manchester United.

On 11 January 2014, Adrián kept his first Premier League clean sheet, in the 2–0 away win over Cardiff City. On 6 May, he attended the club's awards and won "Save of the Season" for a fingertip save from Oscar against Chelsea in January. He also won "Best Individual Performance" for the same match, in which he kept a clean sheet in a goalless draw, as well as "Signing of the Season". He was also named runner-up "Hammer of the Year" to Mark Noble. By the end of the 2013–14 season, he had become West Ham's first-choice goalkeeper, replacing previous incumbent Jussi Jääskeläinen.

In an FA Cup third-round replay penalty shoot-out against Everton on 13 January 2015, Adrián saved from Steven Naismith. The shootout went to sudden death, in which he scored the winner after his Everton counterpart, compatriot Joel Robles, struck the crossbar. Despite having never taken a competitive penalty before, he was so confident he would score and win the match that he removed his goalkeeping gloves before taking it – his team won it 9–8.

On 11 February 2015, Adrián was given a straight red card in a goalless draw at Southampton for handling the ball outside the penalty area while pressured by Sadio Mané. His suspension for this dismissal was rescinded by the Football Association, although West Ham were charged with failing to control their players following the incident, being fined £30,000. He played all 38 league matches and all four FA Cup matches during the campaign.

Adrián received a straight red card in added time at the end of West Ham's 1–2 home loss to Leicester City on 15 August 2015 for a high challenge on Jamie Vardy, after going up for a corner kick. As the team had already made all of their substitutions, Carl Jenkinson became the goalkeeper for the remainder of the match. In October 2015, he signed a new two-year contract with the option of a further two years, keeping him at the club until 2017.

Adrián was released by West Ham at the end of the 2018–19 season. His last game came on 26 January 2019 in a 4–2 away defeat to AFC Wimbledon in the FA Cup. He had played in 150 matches in all competitions for West Ham but only five in his final season, all cup games, as his place in their Premier League team was taken by Łukasz Fabiański. Adrián chose to leave the club despite a three-year contract offer because he "hadn't played a single game all season in the Premier League" and "didn't feel valued economically either".

=== Liverpool ===
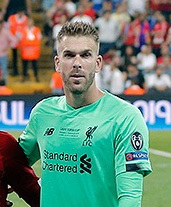
Adrián lining up for Liverpool before the 2019 UEFA Super Cup

On 5 August 2019, it was announced that Adrián had signed for Liverpool on a free transfer. He made his debut for the club on 9 August in a 4–1 win against Norwich City, coming on in the 39th minute, replacing the injured Alisson Becker. On 14 August, Adrián started in the 2019 UEFA Super Cup; in extra-time, he conceded a penalty for a foul on Tammy Abraham, from which Jorginho was able to tie the match for Chelsea. Following a 2–2 draw, the match went to a penalty shoot-out, in which Adrián saved Abraham's final penalty, winning Liverpool their first trophy of the 2019–20 season with a 5–4 victory on penalties. It was also Adrián's first trophy of his career. Liverpool manager, Jürgen Klopp described his performance in the game as "incredible".

Adrián made his Champions League debut against Napoli at the Stadio San Paolo on 17 September. Although he made a remarkable save from Belgian international Dries Mertens when the game was scoreless, Adrian fell to his first defeat as a Liverpool player on a 2–0 scoreline. On 11 March 2020, Adrián stood in for Becker as holders Liverpool were knocked out of the Champions League by Atlético Madrid. Already 1–0 down from the first leg in Spain, Liverpool lost 3–2 at Anfield with some of Adrián's goalkeeping decisions coming under scrutiny.

On 14 June 2021, Liverpool announced they have extended his contract, but without exposing any details regarding the duration of the extension. Due to the unavailability of first and second choice goalkeepers Alisson Becker and Caoimhín Kelleher, Adrián played in the 2022 FA Community Shield in July 2022 against Manchester City which Liverpool won 3–1.

On 30 June 2023, Adrián extended his contract with Liverpool until the end of the 2023–24 season. On 7 July 2024, it was confirmed that he would leave Liverpool after 5 years.

=== Return to Betis ===
On 8 July 2024, Adrián returned to Real Betis on a free transfer, signing a two-year contract.

=== Retirement ===
On 22 May 2026, Adrián announced his retirement from professional football at the end of the 2025–26 season. His final professional match was in a 2–1 win against Levante, on the final day of the 2025–26 La Liga season.

== International career ==
On 26 August 2016, Adrián received his first call-up to the senior Spain squad by new manager Julen Lopetegui for matches against Belgium and Liechtenstein.

== Career statistics ==
As of match played 23 May 2026

Appearances and goals by club, season and competition
Club	Season	League			National cup (Note: Includes Copa del Rey, FA Cup)		League cup (Note: Includes EFL Cup)		Europe		Other		Total	
Club	Season	Division	Apps	Goals	Apps	Goals	Apps	Goals	Apps	Goals	Apps	Goals	Apps	Goals
Real Betis C	2006–07	Regional Preferente	13	0	—		—		—		—		13	0
Real Betis C	2007–08	Regional Preferente	10	0	—		—		—		—		10	0
Real Betis C	Total		23	0	—		—		—		—		23	0
Real Betis B	2007–08	Segunda División B	3	0	—		—		—		—		3	0
Real Betis B	2008–09	Segunda División B	14	0	—		—		—		—		14	0
Real Betis B	2009–10	Segunda División B	12	0	—		—		—		—		12	0
Real Betis B	2010–11	Segunda División B	22	0	—		—		—		2 (Note: Appearances in Segunda División B play-offs)	0	24	0
Real Betis B	2011–12	Segunda División B	11	0	—		—		—		—		11	0
Real Betis B	Total		62	0	—		—		—		2	0	64	0
Alcalá (loan)	2007–08	Tercera División	5	0	0	0	—		—		—		5	0
Utrera (loan)	2008–09	Primera Andaluza	13	0	0	0	—		—		—		13	0
Real Betis	2012–13	La Liga	32	0	0	0	—		—		—		32	0
West Ham United	2013–14	Premier League	20	0	1	0	5	0	—		—		26	0
West Ham United	2014–15	Premier League	38	0	4	0	0	0	—		—		42	0
West Ham United	2015–16	Premier League	32	0	0	0	1	0	3 (Note: Appearance(s) in UEFA Europa League)	0	—		36	0
West Ham United	2016–17	Premier League	16	0	1	0	1	0	1	0	—		19	0
West Ham United	2017–18	Premier League	19	0	0	0	3	0	—		—		22	0
West Ham United	2018–19	Premier League	0	0	2	0	3	0	—		—		5	0
West Ham United	Total		125	0	8	0	13	0	4	0	—		150	0
Liverpool	2019–20	Premier League	11	0	3	0	0	0	3 (Note: Appearance(s) in UEFA Champions League)	0	1 (Note: Appearance in UEFA Super Cup)	0	18	0
Liverpool	2020–21	Premier League	3	0	0	0	2	0	1	0	0	0	6	0
Liverpool	2021–22	Premier League	0	0	0	0	1	0	0	0	—		1	0
Liverpool	2022–23	Premier League	0	0	0	0	0	0	0	0	1 (Note: Appearance in FA Community Shield)	0	1	0
Liverpool	2023–24	Premier League	0	0	0	0	0	0	0	0	—		0	0
Liverpool	Total		14	0	3	0	3	0	4	0	2	0	26	0
Real Betis	2024–25	La Liga	19	0	0	0	—		7 (Note: Appearances in UEFA Conference League)	0	—		26	0
Real Betis	2025–26	La Liga	1	0	5	0	—		0	0	—		6	0
Real Betis	Total		20	0	5	0	—		7	0	—		32	0
Career total			232	0	16	0	16	0	15	0	4	0	345	0

== Honours ==
Liverpool

- Premier League: 2019–20
- EFL Cup: 2023–24
- FA Community Shield: 2022
- UEFA Super Cup: 2019
- FIFA Club World Cup: 2019

Betis

- UEFA Conference League runner-up: 2024–25
