= Natan (footballer, born 2001) =

Brazilian footballer

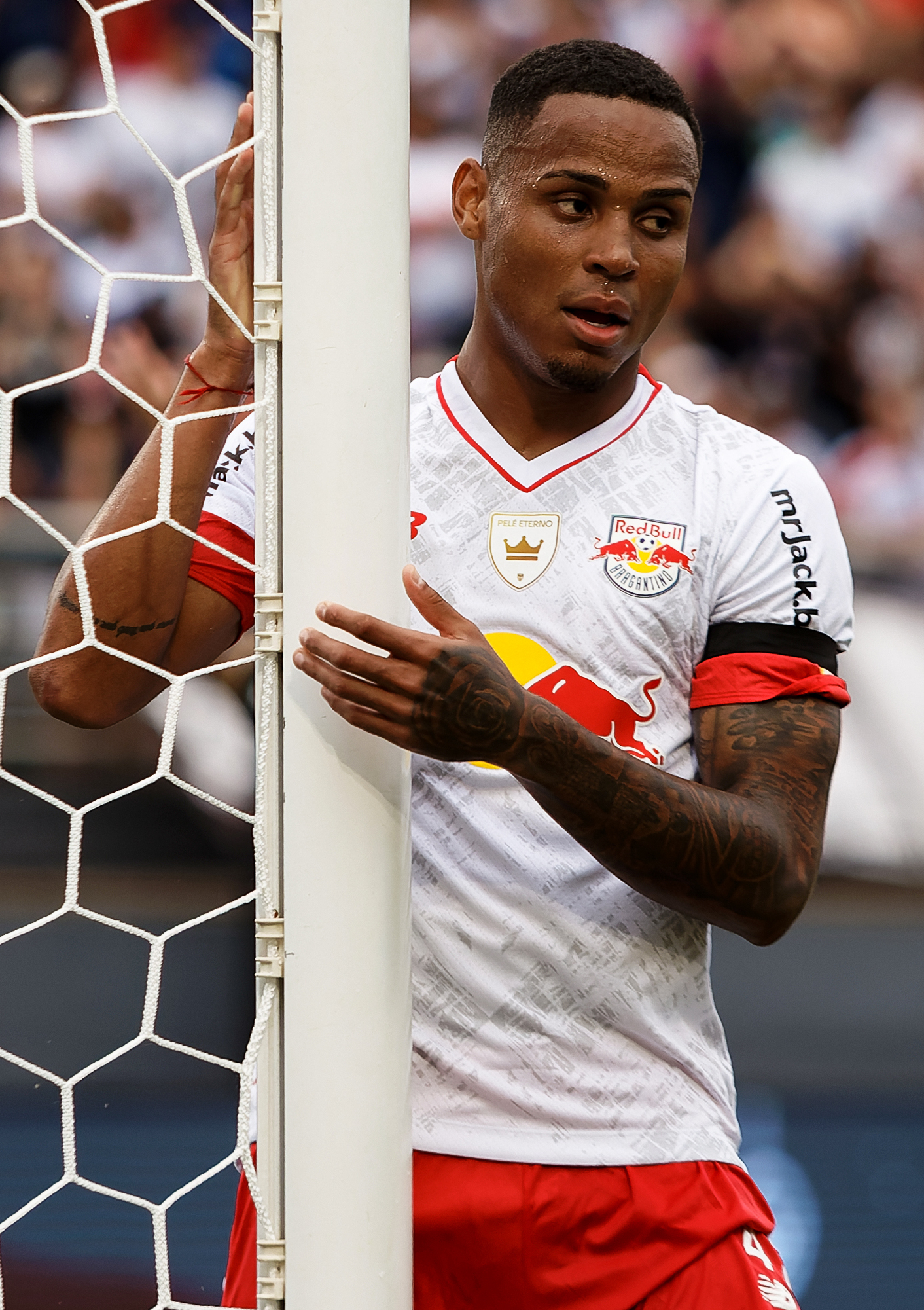
- Natan with Red Bull Bragantino in 2023

Personal information
- Full name: Natan Bernardo de Souza
- Date of birth: 6 February 2001 (age 25)
- Place of birth: Itapecerica da Serra, Brazil
- Height: 1.88 m (6 ft 2 in)
- Position: Centre-back

Team information
- Current team: Betis
- Number: 4

Youth career
- 2015: Ponte Preta
- 2016–2020: Flamengo

Senior career*
Years	Team	Apps	(Gls)
2020–2021	Flamengo	17	(1)
2021	→ Red Bull Bragantino (loan)	29	(0)
2022–2023	Red Bull Bragantino	59	(3)
2023–2025	Napoli	14	(0)
2024–2025	→ Betis (loan)	31	(1)
2025–	Betis	42	(1)
- * Club domestic league appearances and goals as of 20:30, 31 October 2026 (UTC)

Natan Bernardo de Souza (born 6 February 2001), simply known as Natan, is a Brazilian professional footballer who plays as a centre-back for La Liga club Real Betis.

== Career ==
=== Flamengo ===
Born in Itapecerica da Serra, Natan began his career with Flamengo and made his professional debut for the club on 27 September 2020 against Palmeiras. He started and played the whole match as Flamengo drew 1–1.

==== Red Bull Bragantino (loan) ====
On 15 March 2021, Red Bull Bragantino signed Natan from Flamengo on loan until 31 December 2021 with a R$5m (€760,000) fee; the deal had a purchase clause: if Natan reached 20 official matches during the loan spell, the transfer would become permanent for R$27 million (€4.32 million).

=== Red Bull Bragantino ===
On 22 January 2022, Red Bull Bragantino officially announced that they would exercise the buy clause in Natan's loan contract, running until December 2026.

=== Napoli ===
On 7 August 2023, Natan joined Serie A club Napoli, by signing a five-year contract for a reported €10 million transfer fee.

=== Real Betis ===
On 15 August 2024, Natan joined La Liga club Real Betis on loan until 30 June 2025. On 9 June 2025, Betis exercised the €9 million buy option to make the transfer permanent. In May 2026, several sources reported that Natan was included in Carlo Ancelotti's pre-list for the Brazil national team due to compete at the 2026 FIFA World Cup.

== Career statistics ==
As of match played 31 October 2026

Appearances and goals by club, season and competition
Club	Season	League			State League (Note: Includes Campeonato Carioca, Campeonato Paulista)		National cup (Note: Includes Copa do Brasil, Copa del Rey)		Continental		Other		Total	
Club	Season	Division	Apps	Goals	Apps	Goals	Apps	Goals	Apps	Goals	Apps	Goals	Apps	Goals
Flamengo	2020	Série A	14	1	—		0	0	1 (Note: Appearance(s) in Copa Libertadores)	0	—		15	1
Flamengo	2021	Série A	0	0	3	0	0	0	0	0	—		3	0
Flamengo	Total		14	1	3	0	0	0	1	0	—		18	1
Red Bull Bragantino (loan)	2021	Série A	24	0	5	0	1	0	4 (Note: Appearances in Copa Sudamericana)	0	—		34	0
Red Bull Bragantino	2022	Série A	32	2	7	1	2	0	3	0	—		44	3
Red Bull Bragantino	2023	Série A	10	0	10	0	2	0	4	0	—		26	0
Red Bull Bragantino	Bragantino total		66	2	22	1	5	0	11	0	—		104	3
Napoli	2023–24	Serie A	14	0	—		0	0	6 (Note: Appearances in UEFA Champions League)	0	0	0	20	0
Betis (loan)	2024–25	La Liga	31	1	—		4	0	17 (Note: Appearances in UEFA Conference League)	1	—		52	1
Betis	2025–26	La Liga	33	0	—		3	0	9 (Note: Appearances in UEFA Europa League)	0	—		45	0
Betis	2026–27	La Liga	9	1	—		0	0	3	0	—		12	1
Betis	Betis total		73	2	—		3	0	30	1	—		109	2
Career total			166	5	25	1	12	0	46	1	0	0	249	7

== Honours ==
Flamengo

- Campeonato Brasileiro Série A: 2020

Betis

- UEFA Conference League runner-up: 2024–25

Individual

- UEFA Conference League Team of the Season: 2024–25
