= Sergi Altimira =

Spanish footballer (born 2001)

Personal information
- Full name: Sergi Altimira Clavell
- Date of birth: 25 August 2001 (age 25)
- Place of birth: Cardedeu, Spain
- Height: 1.88 m (6 ft 2 in)
- Position: Defensive midfielder

Team information
- Current team: Sporting CP
- Number: 5

Youth career
- 2006–2012: Cardedeu
- 2012–2019: Barcelona
- 2019–2020: Sabadell

Senior career*
Years	Team	Apps	(Gls)
2020–2023	Sabadell	61	(0)
2020–2021	→ Granollers (loan)	23	(0)
2023	Getafe	0	(0)
2023–2026	Betis	69	(1)
2026–	Sporting CP	8	(1)

International career
2024–	Catalonia	1	(0)
- * Club domestic league appearances and goals as of 06:57, 25 October 2026 (UTC)

Sergi Altimira Clavell (born 25 August 2001) is a Spanish professional footballer who plays as a defensive midfielder for Primeira Liga club Sporting CP.

== Career ==
=== Sabadell ===
Born in Cardedeu, Barcelona, Catalonia, Altimira joined Barcelona's La Masia in 2012, from hometown club Cardedeu. In 2019, he left Barça and joined Sabadell.

==== Loan to Granollers ====
On 29 May 2020, after finishing his formation, Altimira was loaned to Tercera División side Granollers for the season. He made his senior debut on 1 November, coming on as a second-half substitute in a 7–0 away routing of Figueres.

==== Breakthrough ====
Upon returning to Sabadell, Altimira was included in the first team squad by manager Antonio Hidalgo, and renewed his contract with the club on 7 September 2021. He played 29 times for the side in all competitions during the 2021–22 campaign.

Altimira's performances has led to interest in his services from his former club Barcelona, amongst others. Strong interest was reported to be present from the Gerard Piqué's Andorra, as well as from La Liga side Villarreal. However, despite Barcelona's efforts to sign Altimira on the final day of the transfer window in August 2022, they were unable to agree terms on the transfer leaving Altimira remaining under contract to Sabadell until June 2023.

=== Getafe ===
On 31 January 2023, Marca reported that Altimira had an agreement to join top tier club Getafe on a four-year contract upon the conclusion of his contract with Sabadell. On 6 July, the club officially announced his signing.

=== Betis ===
On 11 August 2023, Altimira signed a five-year contract with Real Betis also in the top tier, after the club paid his € 2 million release clause. He made his professional debut on 2 September, replacing Isco late into a 1–0 home win over Rayo Vallecano.

Altimira scored his first professional goal on 27 January 2024, netting the winner in a 1–0 away success over Mallorca. Initially a backup option, he subsequently established himself as a regular starter, and renewed his contract until 2029 on 11 April 2025.

=== Sporting CP ===
On 30 June 2026, Altimira moved abroad for the first time in his career, signing a five-year contract with Primeira Liga side Sporting CP.

== Personal life ==
Altimira's father Aureli and his cousin Adrià are also footballers. The former played as a forward, while the latter is a defender; both were also groomed at Barça.

== Career statistics ==
As of match played 12 May 2026

Appearances and goals by club, season and competition
Club	Season	League			Copa del Rey		Europe		Total	
Club	Season	Division	Apps	Goals	Apps	Goals	Apps	Goals	Apps	Goals
Granollers (loan)	2020–21	Tercera División	23	0	—		—		23	0
Sabadell	2021–22	Primera Federación	28	0	1	0	—		29	0
Sabadell	2022–23	Primera Federación	33	0	—		—		33	0
Sabadell	Total		61	0	1	0	—		62	0
Getafe	2023–24	La Liga	0	0	0	0	—		0	0
Real Betis	2023–24	La Liga	14	1	3	0	0	0	17	1
Real Betis	2024–25	La Liga	32	0	4	1	17 (Note: Appearances in UEFA Conference League)	0	53	1
Real Betis	2025–26	La Liga	23	0	4	1	10 (Note: Appearances in UEFA Europa League)	0	37	1
Real Betis	Total		69	1	11	2	27	0	107	3
Career total			153	1	12	2	27	0	192	3

== Honours ==
Betis

- UEFA Conference League runner-up: 2024–25
