= Iker Losada =

Spanish footballer

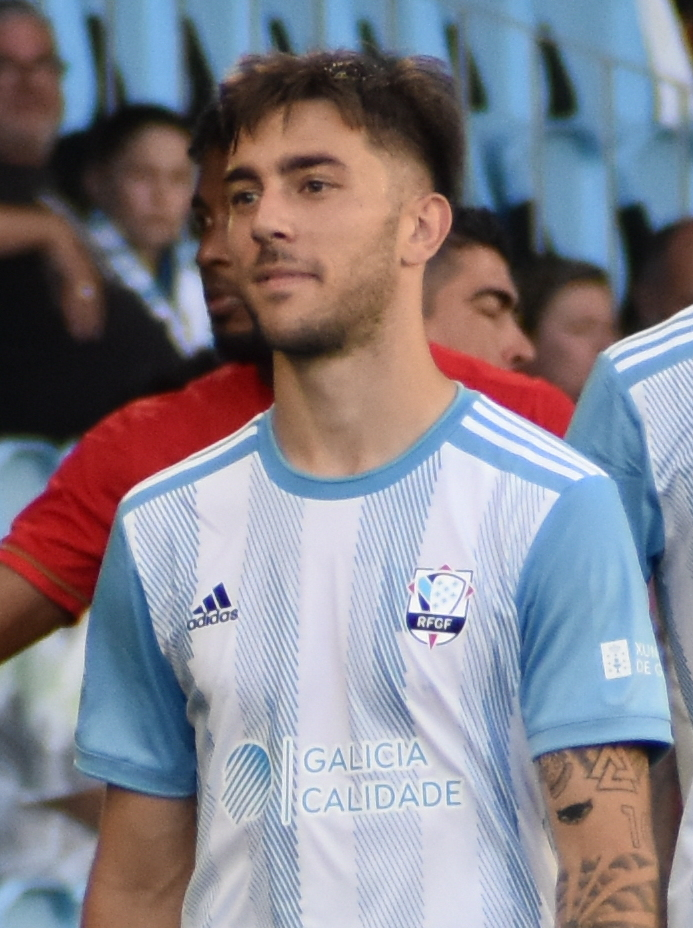
- Losada with Galicia in 2024

Personal information
- Full name: Iker Losada Aragunde
- Date of birth: 1 August 2001 (age 25)
- Place of birth: Catoira, Spain
- Height: 1.75 m (5 ft 9 in)
- Position: Forward

Team information
- Current team: Betis

Youth career
- 2012–2019: Celta

Senior career*
Years	Team	Apps	(Gls)
2018–2023	Celta B	102	(15)
2019–2023	Celta	2	(1)
2023–2024	Racing Ferrol	42	(9)
2024–	Betis	10	(0)
2025	→ Celta (loan)	12	(1)
2025–2026	→ Levante (loan)	23	(3)

International career
2019	Spain U18	6	(1)
2019	Spain U19	2	(0)
2024	Galicia	1	(0)
- * Club domestic league appearances and goals as of 27 May 2026

Iker Losada Aragunde (born 1 August 2001) is a Spanish professional footballer who plays as a forward for La Liga club Real Betis.

== Club career ==
=== Celta ===
Losada was born in Catoira, Pontevedra, Galicia. A RC Celta de Vigo youth graduate, he made his senior debut with the reserves on 2 December 2018, coming on as a late substitute for Dani Vega in a 0–0 Segunda División B away draw against AD Unión Adarve.

Losada spent the 2019 pre-season with the first team, scoring a goal in a friendly match against 1. FC Union Berlin and becoming the first player of the 21st century to do so for the club. He made his professional – and La Liga – debut on 17 August; replacing fellow debutant Gabriel Fernández, he scored his team's only goal in a 1–3 home loss against Real Madrid.

Losada subsequently played almost exclusively for the B's in the third division and also in Primera Federación, and renewed his contract until 2025 on 11 May 2022. He left Celta after 11 years on 3 July 2023, after the club decided not to promote him to the main squad.

=== Racing Ferrol ===
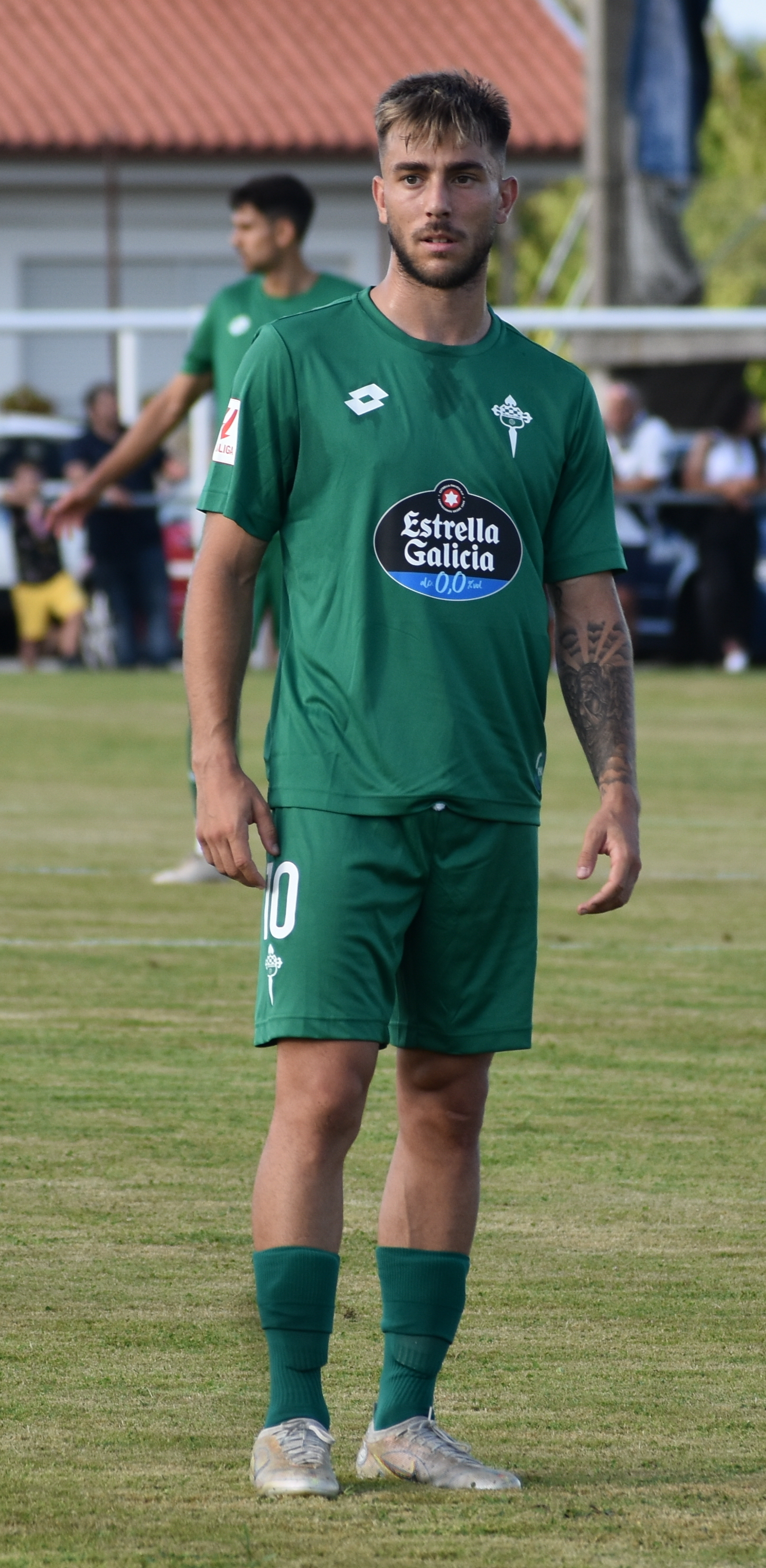
Losada with Racing Ferrol in 2023

On 5 July 2023, Losada signed for Racing de Ferrol, newly-promoted to Segunda División. An undisputed starter, he scored nine goals and provided seven assists during the season.

=== Betis ===
On 6 July 2024, Losada signed a five-year contract with Real Betis in the top tier. The following 30 January, however, he returned to Celta on loan for the remainder of the season.

On 21 August 2025, Losada moved to fellow top tier side Levante UD on a one-year loan deal.

== Career statistics ==
As of match played 24 May 2026

Appearances and goals by club, season and competition
Club	Season	League			Copa del Rey		Europe		Other		Total	
Club	Season	Division	Apps	Goals	Apps	Goals	Apps	Goals	Apps	Goals	Apps	Goals
Celta B	2018–19	Segunda División B	4	0	—		—		—		4	0
Celta B	2019–20	Segunda División B	15	1	—		—		—		15	1
Celta B	2020–21	Segunda División B	24	2	—		—		—		24	2
Celta B	2021–22	Primera Federación	26	3	—		—		—		26	3
Celta B	2022–23	Primera Federación	33	9	—		—		2 (Note: Appearance in Primera Federación play-offs)	0	35	9
Celta B	Total		102	15	0	0	—		2	0	104	15
Celta	2019–20	La Liga	2	1	2	0	—		—		4	1
Racing Ferrol	2023–24	Segunda División	42	9	3	0	—		—		45	9
Real Betis	2024–25	La Liga	10	0	3	0	2 (Note: Appearances in UEFA Conference League)	0	—		15	0
Real Betis	2026–27	La Liga	0	0	0	0	0	0	—		0	0
Real Betis	Total		10	0	3	0	2	0	—		15	0
Celta (loan)	2024–25	La Liga	12	1	—		—		—		12	1
Levante (loan)	2025–26	La Liga	23	3	3	0	—		—		26	3
Career total			191	28	11	0	2	0	2	0	206	28
