= Irfan Peljto =

Bosnian football referee (born 1984)

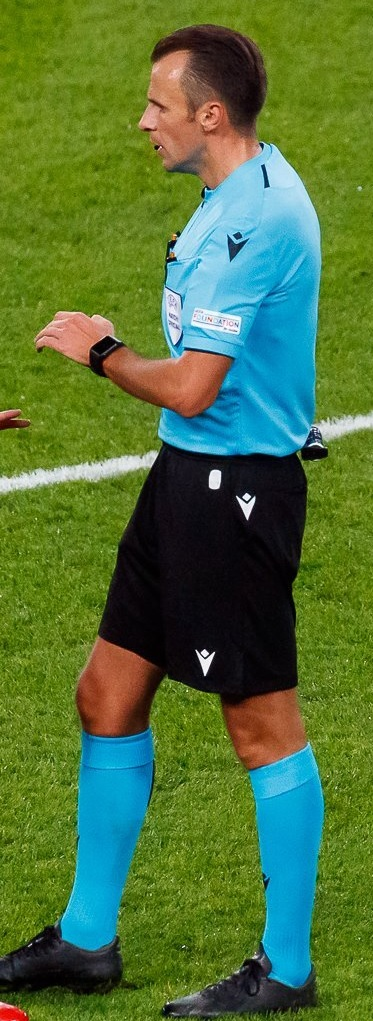
- Peljto in 2021
- Born: 18 July 1984 (age 42); Sarajevo, SR Bosnia and Herzegovina, Yugoslavia

Domestic
Years	League	Role
2013–	Bosnian Premier League	Referee

International
Years	League	Role
2015–	FIFA listed	Referee

Irfan Peljto (born 18 July 1984) is a Bosnian professional football referee who officiates primarily in the Bosnian Premier League. He has been a FIFA referee since 2015, and is ranked as a UEFA elite category referee.

Peljto is the only Bosnian referee to have officiated any UEFA Champions League group stage or knockout phase match. He is also the only referee from Bosnia and Herzegovina to have officiated any UEFA club competition final.

== Refereeing career ==
In 2013, Peljto began officiating in the Bosnian Premier League. His first match as referee was on 27 July 2013 between Rudar Prijedor and Radnik Bijeljina. In 2015, he was put on the FIFA referees list. He officiated his first senior international match on 8 June 2019 between Belgium and Kazakhstan.

On 24 November 2021, Peljto officiated his first UEFA Champions League group stage match between Beşiktaş and Ajax, becoming the first referee from Bosnia and Herzegovina to officiate a UEFA Champions League match. He officiated his first ever Champions League knockout phase game between RB Leipzig and Real Madrid on 13 February 2024.

In April 2025, Peljto refereed the first leg of the Champions League quarter-final between Arsenal and Real Madrid. On 12 May 2025, he was selected to officiate the 2025 UEFA Conference League final between Real Betis and Chelsea, which was held on 28 May 2025, at the Wrocław Stadium in Wrocław, becoming the first Bosnian referee to officiate a UEFA club competition final.

Sporting positions (Bosnia and Herzegovina) Irfan Peljto
Preceded by 2024 (Portugal) Artur Soares Dias	UEFA Conference League final referee 2025	Succeeded by 2026 (Italy) Maurizio Mariani
