= Marc Roca =

Spanish footballer (born 1996)

Personal information
- Full name: Marc Roca Junqué
- Date of birth: 26 November 1996 (age 29)
- Place of birth: Vilafranca, Spain
- Height: 1.84 m (6 ft 0 in)
- Position: Defensive midfielder

Team information
- Current team: Betis
- Number: 21

Youth career
- 2003–2008: Atlètic Vilafranca
- 2008–2015: Espanyol

Senior career*
Years	Team	Apps	(Gls)
2014–2017	Espanyol B	51	(6)
2016–2020	Espanyol	105	(3)
2020–2022	Bayern Munich	15	(0)
2022–2024	Leeds United	32	(1)
2023–2024	→ Betis (loan)	26	(2)
2024–	Betis	50	(4)

International career^{‡}
2015	Spain U19	1	(0)
2018–2019	Spain U21	7	(2)
2016–	Catalonia	2	(0)
Medal record
Men's football
Representing Spain
UEFA European Under-21 Championship
Winner	2019 Italy	Team
- * Club domestic league appearances and goals as of 20:30, 31 October 2026 (UTC) ‡ National team caps and goals as of 20:05, 2 June 2025 (UTC)

Marc Roca Junqué (born 26 November 1996) is a Spanish professional footballer who plays as a defensive midfielder for La Liga club Real Betis.

He started his career at Espanyol, appearing in 121 competitive matches and four La Liga seasons. In October 2020, he signed with Bayern Munich.

Roca won the 2019 European Under-21 Championship with Spain.

== Club career ==
=== Espanyol ===
Born in Vilafranca del Penedès, Barcelona, Catalonia, and raised in neighbouring La Granada, Roca joined RCD Espanyol's youth setup in 2008, aged 11. On 24 August 2014, he made his senior debut with the reserves, starting in a 2–2 Segunda División B home draw against Lleida Esportiu.

Roca scored his first senior goal on 17 January 2015, his team's second in a 2–3 home loss to UE Olot. On 4 August, he renewed his contract until 2017.

On 26 August 2016, Roca made his first-team – and La Liga – debut, starting in a 2–2 home draw against Málaga CF. On 11 November, he agreed to an extension until 2022 and was permanently promoted to the main squad the following season.

Roca scored his first goal in the top flight on 21 April 2019, in a 2–2 draw at Levante UD. He played 44 matches across all competitions in the 2019–20 campaign, but the club was relegated to Segunda División for the first time in 26 years.

=== Bayern Munich ===
On 4 October 2020, Roca signed for FC Bayern Munich on a five-year contract. He made his official debut 11 days later, in a 3–0 defeat of amateurs 1. FC Düren in the first round of the DFB-Pokal. He appeared in his first Bundesliga match later that month, coming on as an injury-time substitute for Serge Gnabry in the 2–1 away victory over 1. FC Köln.

Roca played his first-ever game in the UEFA Champions League on 25 November 2020, starting and being sent off for two bookable offences midway through the second half on an eventual 3–1 group stage win against FC Red Bull Salzburg. He totalled only 11 appearances in his first season.

Roca featured slightly more in 2021–22 as his team won the league again, but was once again a fringe first-team player.

=== Leeds United ===
On 17 June 2022, Leeds United announced that Roca would join the club on 1 July after an agreement was reached with Bayern Munich; he agreed to a four-year contract for a reported €12,000,000 fee that could eventually rise on add-ons. He made his Premier League debut on 6 August, starting in a 2–1 home victory over Wolverhampton Wanderers. He scored his first goal one month later, in the 5–2 away defeat to Brentford.

=== Betis ===
Roca returned to Spain in the summer of 2023, on a season-long loan at Real Betis. He scored his first goal on 1 October, through a header in a 3–0 win over Valencia CF. His third came one month later, in the 12–1 away rout of amateurs CD Hernán Cortés in the opening round of the Copa del Rey.

On 28 June 2024, Roca agreed to a permanent deal. He spent the better part of the campaign nursing a left-ankle injury, playing only 17 games in all competitions.

== International career ==
On 28 December 2016, Roca made his debut for the Catalonia autonomous team, starting in a 3–3 draw against Tunisia (4–2 penalty loss). He was named in Spain's under-21 squad for the 2019 UEFA European Championship, starting the final three games of the tournament for the eventual winners including a 4–1 semi-final victory over France in which he scored.

== Career statistics ==
As of match played 31 October 2026

Appearances and goals by club, season and competition
Club	Season	League			National cup (Note: Includes Copa del Rey, DFB-Pokal, FA Cup)		League cup (Note: Includes EFL Cup)		Europe		Other		Total	
Club	Season	Division	Apps	Goals	Apps	Goals	Apps	Goals	Apps	Goals	Apps	Goals	Apps	Goals
Espanyol B	2014–15	Segunda División B	11	1	—		—		—		—		11	1
Espanyol B	2015–16	Segunda División B	34	3	—		—		—		—		34	3
Espanyol B	2016–17	Segunda División B	6	2	—		—		—		—		6	2
Espanyol B	Total		51	6	—		—		—		—		51	6
Espanyol	2016–17	La Liga	25	0	1	0	—		—		—		26	0
Espanyol	2017–18	La Liga	8	0	1	0	—		—		—		9	0
Espanyol	2018–19	La Liga	35	1	5	0	—		—		—		40	1
Espanyol	2019–20	La Liga	35	2	1	0	—		8 (Note: Appearances in UEFA Europa League)	0	—		44	2
Espanyol	2020–21	Segunda División	2	0	0	0	—		—		—		2	0
Espanyol	Total		105	3	8	0	—		8	0	—		121	3
Bayern Munich	2020–21	Bundesliga	6	0	2	0	—		2 (Note: Appearances in UEFA Champions League)	0	1 (Note: Appearance in FIFA Club World Cup)	0	11	0
Bayern Munich	2021–22	Bundesliga	9	0	0	0	—		4	0	0	0	13	0
Bayern Munich	Total		15	0	2	0	—		6	0	1	0	24	0
Leeds United	2022–23	Premier League	32	1	3	0	1	0	—		—		36	1
Betis (loan)	2023–24	La Liga	26	2	3	1	—		8 (Note: Six appearances and one goal in UEFA Europa League, two appearances in UEFA Europa Conference League)	1	—		37	4
Betis	2024–25	La Liga	14	2	0	0	—		3 (Note: Appearances in UEFA Conference League)	0	—		17	2
Betis	2025–26	La Liga	29	1	3	0	—		8	0	—		40	1
Betis	2026–27	La Liga	7	1	0	0	—		3	0	—		10	1
Betis	Total		76	6	6	1	—		22	1	—		104	8
Career total			279	16	19	1	1	0	36	1	1	0	336	18

== Honours ==
Espanyol

- Segunda División: 2020–21

Bayern Munich

- Bundesliga: 2020–21, 2021–22
- FIFA Club World Cup: 2020

Spain U21

- UEFA European Under-21 Championship: 2019
