= Dani Pérez (footballer) =

Spanish footballer (born 2005)

Personal information
- Full name: Daniel Pérez Guerrero
- Date of birth: 26 July 2005 (age 21)
- Place of birth: Seville, Spain
- Height: 1.73 m (5 ft 8 in)
- Position: Midfielder

Team information
- Current team: Valladolid

Youth career
- 2013–2022: Betis

Senior career*
Years	Team	Apps	(Gls)
2022–2026	Betis B	88	(1)
2022–2026	Betis	1	(0)
2026–	Valladolid	0	(0)

International career^{‡}
2021–2022	Spain U17	11	(0)
2022	Spain U18	5	(0)
2022–	Spain U19	8	(0)
- * Club domestic league appearances and goals as of 10 June 2026 ‡ National team caps and goals as of 20 February 2025

Daniel Pérez Guerrero (born 26 July 2005) is a Spanish professional footballer who plays as a midfielder for Real Valladolid.

== Club career ==
=== Betis ===
Pérez is a youth product of Real Betis, and worked his way up their youth sides before being promoted to their reserves in 2022. On 5 October 2022, he signed a professional contract with Betis until 2025 and started training with their senior squad.

Pérez made his first team debut with the Verdiblancos on 3 November 2022, coming on as a late substitute in a 3–0 UEFA Europa League win over HJK Helsinki. In October 2023, he suffered a serious knee injury, being away from first team matches for nearly a year.

Pérez made his La Liga debut on 27 August 2025, replacing Giovani Lo Celso late into a 1–1 away draw against Celta Vigo.

=== Valladolid ===
On 2 July 2026, Segunda División side Real Valladolid announced the signing of Pérez on a three-year deal.

== International career ==
Pérez is a youth international for Spain, having played up to the Spain U18s.

== Personal life ==
Pérez is the cousin of the Olympic gymnast Ana Pérez.

== Career statistics ==
As of match played 22 January 2026

Appearances and goals by club, season and competition
Club	Season	League			National Cup		Europe		Other		Total	
Club	Season	Division	Apps	Goals	Apps	Goals	Apps	Goals	Apps	Goals	Apps	Goals
Betis B	2021–22	Primera Federación	1	0	—		—		—		1	0
Betis B	2022–23	Segunda Federación	28	0	—		—		—		28	0
Betis B	2023–24	Segunda Federación	6	0	—		—		—		6	0
Betis B	2024–25	Primera Federación	21	1	—		—		—		21	1
Betis B	Total		56	1	—		—		—		56	1
Betis	2024–25	La Liga	0	0	—		1 (Note: Appearances in UEFA Conference League)	0	—		1	0
Betis	2025–26	La Liga	0	0	—		1 (Note: Appearances in UEFA Europa League)	0	—		1	0
Betis	Total		0	0	—		2	0	—		2	0
Career total			56	1	0	0	2	0	0	0	58	1
