= Keimer Sandoval =

Colombian footballer (born 2005)

Personal information
- Full name: Keimer Andrés Sandoval Rodríguez
- Date of birth: 3 September 2005 (age 21)
- Place of birth: Santiago de Cali, Colombia
- Height: 1.80 m (5 ft 11 in)
- Position: Defender

Team information
- Current team: Deportivo Cali

Senior career*
Years	Team	Apps	(Gls)
2023–2024	Orsomarso	25	(0)
2024–2025	Betis B	1	(0)
2025	→ Red Star Belgrade (loan)	2	(0)
2026–	Deportivo Cali	0	(0)

International career^{‡}
2024	Colombia U18	0	(0)
2025–	Colombia U20	9	(0)
- * Club domestic league appearances and goals as of 19 February 2026 ‡ National team caps and goals as of 16 February 2025

Keimer Andrés Sandoval Rodríguez (born 3 September 2005) is a Colombian professional footballer who plays as a defender for Deportivo Cali.

== Career ==
=== Orsomarso ===
Sandoval began his senior career at Colombian club Orsomarso, a club based in Palmira, before joining Spanish club Betis Deportivo Balompié on 1 July 2024.

=== Red Star Belgrade ===
On 30 January 2025, Sandoval was loaned from Betis Deportivo Balompié to Red Star Belgrade on a one-and-a-half-year contract with an option to buy. On 26 March 2025, Sandoval made his debut for Red Star Belgrade in the Serbian Cup, in a 5–3 win over OFK Beograd.

== Honours ==
Red Star Belgrade

- Serbian SuperLiga: 2024–25
