= Mateo Flores (footballer) =

Spanish footballer (born 2004)

Personal information
- Full name: Mateo Flores Lozano
- Date of birth: 7 April 2004 (age 22)
- Place of birth: Valencina de la Concepción, Spain
- Position: Midfielder

Team information
- Current team: Arouca

Youth career
- 2015–2023: Betis
- 2021–2022: → Calavera (loan)

Senior career*
Years	Team	Apps	(Gls)
2023–2025	Betis B	54	(0)
2024–2026	Betis	6	(0)
2025–2026	→ Arouca (loan)	12	(0)
2026–	Arouca	0	(0)
- * Club domestic league appearances and goals as of 25 May 2026

Mateo Flores Lozano (born 7 April 2004) is a Spanish professional footballer who plays as a midfielder for Primeira Liga club FC Arouca.

== Career ==
Born in Valencina de la Concepción, Seville, Andalusia, Flores joined Real Betis' youth sides in 2015, aged 11. He spent a year on loan at Calavera CF, before making his senior debut with the reserves on 9 April 2023, coming on as a late substitute for Santiago van der Putten in a 4–1 Segunda Federación away routing of CD Utrera.

On 3 August 2023, Flores renewed his contract with the Verdiblancos until 2025. On 19 October of the following year, after establishing himself as a regular starter for the B's, he made his first team – and La Liga – debut, replacing Aitor Ruibal in a 2–1 away win over CA Osasuna.

On 26 July 2025, Flores moved abroad for the first time in his career, joining Primeira Liga side FC Arouca on a one-year loan deal. On 19 June 2026, his buyout clause was activated and he signed a permanent three-year contract with the club.

== Career statistics ==
As of match played 17 May 2026

Appearances and goals by club, season and competition
Club	Season	League			Copa del Rey		Europe		Other		Total	
Club	Season	Division	Apps	Goals	Apps	Goals	Apps	Goals	Apps	Goals	Apps	Goals
Betis B	2022–23	Segunda Federación	1	0	—		—		—		1	0
Betis B	2023–24	Segunda Federación	33	0	—		—		4 (Note: Appearances in Segunda Federación play-offs)	0	37	0
Betis B	2024–25	Primera Federación	20	0	—		—		—		20	0
Betis B	Total		54	0	—		—		4	0	58	0
Betis	2024–25	La Liga	6	0	4	0	7 (Note: Appearances in UEFA Conference League)	0	—		17	0
Arouca (loan)	2025–26	Primeira Liga	12	0	0	0	—		—		12	0
Arouca	2026–27	Primeira Liga	0	0	0	0	—		—		0	0
Career total			60	0	4	0	7	0	4	0	87	0

== Honours ==
Betis

- UEFA Conference League runner-up: 2024–25
