= Carlos Guirao (footballer) =

Spanish footballer (born 2003)

Personal information
- Full name: Carlos Guirao Mora
- Date of birth: 27 April 2003 (age 23)
- Place of birth: Madrid, Spain
- Height: 1.75 m (5 ft 9 in)
- Position: Midfielder

Team information
- Current team: Eldense (on loan from Leganés)

Youth career
- 2016–2022: Leganés

Senior career*
| Years | Team | Apps | (Gls) |
| 2022–2025 | Leganés B | 30 | (2) |
| 2022–2023 | → Móstoles (loan) | 28 | (0) |
| 2024–2025 | → Betis B (loan) | 30 | (2) |
| 2024–2025 | → Betis (loan) | 2 | (0) |
| 2025– | Leganés | 20 | (0) |
| 2026– | → Eldense (loan) | 0 | (0) |
- * Club domestic league appearances and goals as of 9 June 2026

Carlos Guirao Mora (born 27 April 2003) is a Spanish professional footballer who plays as a midfielder for CD Eldense, on loan from CD Leganés.

== Career ==
Born in Madrid, Guirao was a CD Leganés youth graduate, having joined their youth sides in 2016, aged 13. On 7 September 2022, after finishing his formation, he was loaned to Tercera Federación side CD Móstoles URJC for the season.

Guirao made his senior debut on 11 September 2022, starting in a 1–0 home win over Las Rozas CF. Back to Lega the following July after being a regular starter, he was assigned to the reserves, and renewed his contract until 2025 on 17 October 2023.

On 30 August 2024, Guirao agreed to a one-year loan deal with Real Betis, being initially assigned to the B-team in Primera Federación. He made his first team – and La Liga – debut on 23 November, starting in a 4–2 away loss to Valencia CF.

Back to Lega in July 2025, Guirao renewed his contract with the club until 2029 on 19 September of that year. On 8 August 2026, he was loaned to fellow Segunda División side CD Eldense, for one year.

== Career statistics ==
As of match played 1 December 2024

Appearances and goals by club, season and competition
| Club | Season | League | | | National cup | | Europe | | Other | | Total | |
| Club | Season | Division | Apps | Goals | Apps | Goals | Apps | Goals | Apps | Goals | Apps | Goals |
|---|---|---|---|---|---|---|---|---|---|---|---|---|
| Leganés B | 2021–22 | Tercera Federación | 0 | 0 | — | | — | | — | | 0 | 0 |
| Leganés B | 2023–24 | Tercera Federación | 30 | 2 | — | | — | | 4 (Note: Appearances in promotion play-offs) | 0 | 34 | 2 |
| Leganés B | Total | | 30 | 2 | — | | — | | 4 | 0 | 34 | 2 |
| Móstoles (loan) | 2022–23 | Tercera Federación | 28 | 0 | 0 | 0 | — | | 2 (Note: Appearances in promotion/relegation play-offs) | 0 | 30 | 0 |
| Betis B (loan) | 2024–25 | Primera Federación | 11 | 0 | — | | — | | — | | 11 | 0 |
| Betis (loan) | 2024–25 | La Liga | 2 | 0 | 1 | 0 | 0 | 0 | — | | 3 | 0 |
| Career total | | | 71 | 2 | 1 | 0 | 0 | 0 | 6 | 0 | 78 | 2 |
