= Aitor Ruibal =

Spanish footballer (born 1996)

Personal information
- Full name: Aitor Ruibal García
- Date of birth: 22 March 1996 (age 30)
- Place of birth: Sallent, Spain
- Height: 1.80 m (5 ft 11 in)
- Positions: Right-back; winger

Team information
- Current team: Betis
- Number: 24

Youth career
- Manresa
- 2013–2015: Cornellà
- 2015: Hospitalet

Senior career*
Years	Team	Apps	(Gls)
2013	Manresa	3	(1)
2014–2015	Cornellà	3	(0)
2015	Hospitalet	17	(3)
2016–2018	Betis B	70	(20)
2017–	Betis	150	(9)
2018	→ Cartagena (loan)	0	(0)
2018–2019	→ Rayo Majadahonda (loan)	34	(11)
2019–2020	→ Leganés (loan)	25	(0)
- * Club domestic league appearances and goals as of 30 October 2026 (UTC)

Aitor Ruibal García (born 22 March 1996) is a Spanish professional footballer who plays as a right-back or winger for La Liga club Real Betis.

== Club career ==
Born in Sallent, Barcelona, Catalonia, Ruibal made his senior debut with CE Manresa in the 2012–13 campaign, in the regional leagues. In 2013 he moved to UE Cornellà, returning to youth football.

Ruibal featured in three first team matches for the side during the 2014–15 season, his first being on 21 December 2014 in a 1–0 Segunda División B home loss against CD Alcoyano. The following February he moved to fellow league team CE L'Hospitalet; initially playing with the Juvenil A squad, he was definitely promoted to the first team on 19 June 2015.

On 22 December 2015, Ruibal signed a one-and-a-half-year contract with Real Betis, being assigned to the reserves also in the third division. He made his first team – and La Liga – debut on 10 December 2017, coming on as a late substitute for Fabián in a 1–0 home loss against Atlético Madrid.

On 10 May 2018, Ruibal was loaned to third division side FC Cartagena until 30 June. On 13 July, he moved to Segunda División side CF Rayo Majadahonda, also in a temporary deal.

On 4 July 2019, Ruibal signed a new three-year deal with the Verdiblancos, being immediately loaned to fellow first division side CD Leganés for one year.

== Career statistics ==
=== Club ===
As of match played 4 November 2026

Appearances and goals by club, season and competition
Club	Season	League			Copa del Rey		Europe		Other		Total	
Club	Season	Division	Apps	Goals	Apps	Goals	Apps	Goals	Apps	Goals	Apps	Goals
Cornellà	2014–15	Segunda División B	3	0	0	0	—		—		3	0
Hospitalet	2015–16	Segunda División B	17	3	0	0	—		—		17	3
Betis B	2015–16	Segunda División B	18	5	—		—		—		18	5
Betis B	2016–17	Tercera División	24	7	—		—		2 (Note: Appearances in Tercera División play-offs)	0	26	7
Betis B	2017–18	Segunda División B	28	8	—		—		—		28	8
Betis B	Total		70	20	—		—		2	0	72	20
Betis	2017–18	La Liga	2	0	0	0	—		—		2	0
Betis	2020–21	La Liga	28	2	2	0	—		—		30	2
Betis	2021–22	La Liga	19	0	6	1	8 (Note: Appearances in UEFA Europa League)	0	—		33	1
Betis	2022–23	La Liga	26	0	2	0	8	2	1 (Note: Appearance in Supercopa de España)	0	37	2
Betis	2023–24	La Liga	18	2	3	0	7 (Note: Five appearances in UEFA Europa League, two appearances in UEFA Europa Conference League)	1	—		28	3
Betis	2024–25	La Liga	29	1	2	0	14 (Note: Appearances in UEFA Conference League)	1	—		45	2
Betis	2025–26	La Liga	27	4	5	0	10	1	—		42	5
Betis	2026–27	La Liga	1	0	0	0	1 (Note: Appearance in UEFA Champions League)	1	—		2	1
Betis	Total		150	9	20	1	48	6	1	0	219	16
Cartagena (loan)	2017–18	Segunda División B	0	0	0	0	—		6 (Note: Appearances in Segunda División B play-offs)	0	6	0
Rayo Majadahonda (loan)	2018–19	Segunda División	34	11	1	1	—		—		35	12
Leganés (loan)	2019–20	La Liga	25	0	4	0	—		—		29	0
Career total			299	43	25	2	48	6	9	0	381	51

== Honours ==
Betis

- Copa del Rey: 2021–22
- UEFA Conference League runner-up: 2024–25

Individual

- La Liga Goal of the Month: December 2023
