= Thomas Tuchel =

German football manager (born 1973)

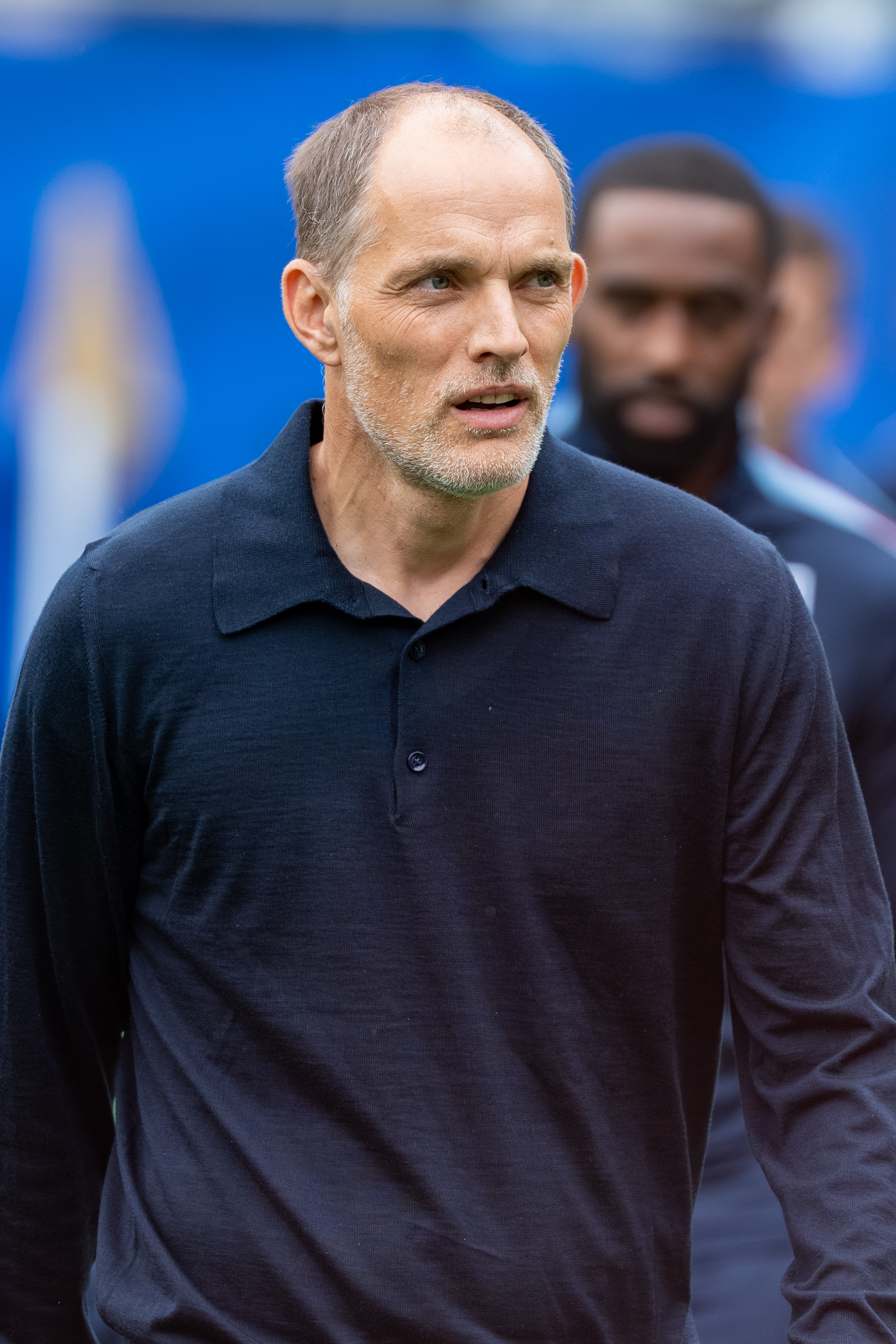
- Tuchel in 2026

Personal information
- Full name: Thomas Tuchel
- Date of birth: 29 August 1973 (age 53)
- Place of birth: Krumbach, Bavaria, West Germany
- Height: 1.92 m (6 ft 4 in)
- Position: Defender

Team information
- Current team: England (manager)

Youth career
- 1979–1987: TSV Krumbach
- 1987–1992: FC Augsburg

Senior career*
| Years | Team | Apps | (Gls) |
| 1992–1994 | Stuttgarter Kickers | 8 | (1) |
| 1995–1998 | SSV Ulm | 69 | (2) |
| Total | | 77 | (3) |

Managerial career
- 2007–2008: FC Augsburg II
- 2009–2014: Mainz 05
- 2015–2017: Borussia Dortmund
- 2018–2020: Paris Saint-Germain
- 2021–2022: Chelsea
- 2023–2024: Bayern Munich
- 2025–: England
Medal record
Men's football
Representing England (as manager)
FIFA World Cup
| Third place | 2026 Canada–Mexico–US |
- * Club domestic league appearances and goals

Thomas Tuchel (German pronunciation: [ˈtoːmas ˈtʊxl̩]; born 29 August 1973) is a German professional football manager and former player who is the current manager of the England national team.

Born in Krumbach in Bavaria, Tuchel retired as a professional footballer at age 25 due to a knee cartilage injury and began his coaching career in 2000 as a youth coach at VfB Stuttgart. In 2009, after a one-year period as the head coach of FC Augsburg II, he was hired by Mainz 05, leaving the club in 2014. He was appointed at Borussia Dortmund in 2015 and won the DFB-Pokal before being dismissed in 2017. Tuchel was hired by Paris Saint-Germain in 2018 and won two league titles, including a domestic quadruple in his second season, and guided the club to its first UEFA Champions League final.

Tuchel became head coach at Chelsea in 2021 and won the Champions League in his debut season, being named The Best FIFA Football Coach. He subsequently went on to win the UEFA Super Cup and Chelsea's first FIFA Club World Cup. After disagreements with club management, Tuchel was dismissed in 2022. He signed with Bayern Munich in 2023 and won the Bundesliga before being dismissed in 2024. Tuchel began his role with England in 2025, leading them to third-place at the 2026 FIFA World Cup, their highest World Cup finish since 1966.

== Playing career ==
Thomas Tuchel was born on 29 August 1973 in Krumbach, Bavaria. He played for his local club, TSV Krumbach, where he was coached by his father, Rudolf. In 1988, he entered the FC Augsburg academy, but he did not make a first‑team appearance and was released at the age of 19. Reflecting on Tuchel's time at the club, youth coordinator Heiner Schuhmann said that "[Tuchel] was a passionate player who gave his all but clashed with his teammates because he was assertive and demanding, which didn't always go over well". After leaving Augsburg, Tuchel joined 2. Bundesliga side Stuttgarter Kickers in 1992.

Tuchel made eight appearances during the 1992–93 season. After the 1993–94 campaign, he was dropped from the Kickers' first team and moved to Regionalliga Süd side SSV Ulm, coached by Hermann Badstuber, father of Holger Badstuber, whom Tuchel would later manage at youth level. Playing as a central defender, he remained with SSV Ulm until 1998, when a knee cartilage injury forced him to retire at the age of 25. He subsequently worked as a bartender until 2000.

== Coaching career ==
=== Early career ===
Tuchel began his coaching career in 2000, hired by Ralf Rangnick as youth team coach at VfB Stuttgart, where he aided in player development; Mario Gómez and Holger Badstuber became club regulars under him. Tuchel coached the club's under-19 side to the Bundesliga title in the 2004–05 campaign. He left after that season, with the club opting not to renew his contract, citing his abrasive coaching style and demeanour. In 2005, Tuchel returned to Augsburg, with club sporting director Andreas Rettig noting the club's admiration of Tuchel's tactical discipline led to him being appointed youth team coordinator.

He was hired despite lacking a UEFA Pro Licence, which he gained in a six-and-a-half month course in Cologne under Erich Rutemöller. Tuchel held the position as coordinator for three years, transitioning into senior club management after accepting the position as first team coach at FC Augsburg II for the 2007–08 season. With Augsburg II, he coached a team which included Julian Nagelsmann, himself an injury-prone defender, who transitioned to a coaching career after Tuchel instructed him to scout for the club in 2008. Tuchel also garnered a reputation for his combustibility towards referees during games, often receiving fines from the Bavarian Football Association (BFV) as a result. At the end of the 2007–08 season, Tuchel's Augsburg II finished fourth.

=== Mainz 05 ===
Tuchel's time as the coach of Augsburg II impressed many top-level German clubs, and he went on to be appointed by Bundesliga club Mainz 05 in 2009, replacing Jorn Andersen. Having signed an initial two-year contract, he was promoted into the role after acting as a youth coach at Mainz for the previous 12 months, during which he had won the U-19 Bundesliga. According to club executive Christian Heidel, Tuchel's perfectionism, going as far as to analyse pitch maintenance prior to a game against Olympiacos, contributed to his eventual appointment.

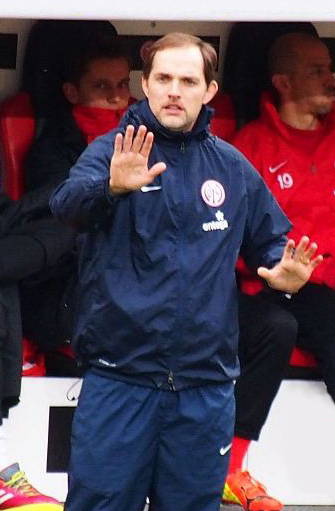
Tuchel at Mainz 05 in 2014

The composition of the squad was seen in Tuchel's tactical approach at Mainz, as despite possessing technically inferior players, he instructed them to utilise long distribution and focus on pressing off the ball, typically overloading one portion of the opposition half in order to create less space to generate counter-attacking opportunities, as relentless high-pressure would create chances by dispossessing or forcing errors from the opposition. An initial disciplinarian, Tuchel reportedly forbade his players to leave the canteen while others were still eating, deeming it ill-mannered. Tuchel's tactics based on pressing and positional play led Mainz to a ninth-placed finish in his first season as manager.

In the following campaign, Tuchel's Mainz enjoyed a perfect start to the season, winning their first seven games, including an away victory over Bayern Munich. This coincided with Tuchel's employment of René Marić and Martin Rafelt, founders of the tactics blog Spielverlagerung, to compile occasional scouting reports on Mainz's opponents. Tuchel eventually led the team to a fifth-placed finish as the club improved by 11 points to qualify for the third-qualifying round of the 2011–12 UEFA Europa League. Only four Bundesliga sides scored more goals than Mainz in the 2010–11 campaign, who had scored 52 goals in total. Of those goals, fifteen had been scored by rising star André Schürrle, and ten by Sami Allagui, who was a key part of Tuchel's pressing machine.

Mainz fell to a thirteenth-placed finish the following season, having notably lost Schürrle to Bayer Leverkusen in the summer. Allagui's lack of form added to Mainz's issues in attack, although new signing Eric Maxim Choupo-Moting was able to score ten goals, and midfielder Julian Baumgartlinger's organization and discipline helped the team and "marked him out" as a future club captain. Mainz suffered an early exit in the Europa League, and ended the season with 39 points, the lowest total during Tuchel's spell at the club. In the 2012–13 season, Mainz would go on to repeat their thirteenth-placed finish from the season prior. Despite a poor start and end to the season, there were significantly fewer struggles than in the previous campaign, and the team finished six points below seventh place. Ádám Szalai, who netted thirteen times, solved the goal-scoring issues up front, while Nicolai Müller and Andreas Ivanschitz scored eight and seven goals respectively. Mainz was knocked out in the quarter-finals of the DFB-Pokal. In what would turn out to be his final season with the club, Tuchel led Mainz to a seventh-place finish, qualifying for the group stages of the 2014–15 UEFA Europa League. At the beginning of the season, he had brought in Japanese forward Shinji Okazaki. Deployed in a central striking role, he went on to have a prolific season, scoring 15 goals in the Bundesliga, a record for a Japanese player.

Despite approaches by Schalke 04 and Bayer Leverkusen for his services in the latter-half of the 2013–14 season, Tuchel remained at Mainz until the end of the campaign. However, in May 2014, he asked to be released from his contract, later stating that he "couldn't see how [the team] could reinvent [itself] once more the coming summer". Tuchel explained that he had already made the decision to leave Mainz at the end of the season in autumn of 2013. Mainz initially refused to release him from his contract, but on 11 May 2014, he was allowed to step down. Tuchel concluded his Mainz career with a record of 72 wins, 46 draws, and 64 losses, from 182 games, with a win percentage of 39.56%; only the big four German clubs — Bayern Munich, Schalke 04, Borussia Dortmund and Bayer Leverkusen — amassed more league points than him, and he achieved a better points record at Mainz than Jürgen Klopp.

=== Borussia Dortmund ===
==== 2015–2016: League runner-up ====
In April 2015, coach Jürgen Klopp announced that he would leave Borussia Dortmund following the 2014–15 season. Dortmund, after evaluating several options, quickly decided on Tuchel as they believed he would double down on Klopp's trademark high intensity pressing system. Tuchel's appointment as the club's new head coach for the following season occurred on 19 April. Signing a three-year deal effective from 1 July, he returned to coaching after over a year without a club. Both Klopp and Tuchel followed the same path of moving from Mainz to Dortmund.

Joining at the beginning of the summer window, Tuchel was eager to avoid speculation and off-the-pitch distractions. He addressed the issue of star players who were in a dilemma between staying and leaving, rapidly convincing them that Dortmund could meet their ambitions. After securing the futures of several important players, Tuchel identified targets that could help the squad compete and "bridge the gap at the top". Dortmund and Tuchel's approach was to build upon Klopp's foundations, retaining the team's core while making shrewd additions. This policy resulted in the acquisitions of Roman Bürki and Julian Weigl, players with unproven potential, while Gonzalo Castro joined the club for €11 million. Another major off-field decision at Dortmund included replacing well-loved pasta dishes with wholemeal products to refine the players' diets. Tactically, Weigl was frequently used by Tuchel behind two central midfielders in a 4–1–4–1 formation, and along with the other two midfielders, he would work the ball until Dortmund could force an overload in space out wide, attacking with rapidity from there. Tuchel also utilised a 4–2–3–1 formation at Dortmund; players like Shinji Kagawa, Henrikh Mkhitaryan, and the deep-dropping Pierre-Emerick Aubameyang would make overloads in pockets of space in-between the lines. Weigl would sit back in front of the defence, while the other central midfielder (often İlkay Gündoğan when fit) pushed up forward.

Although unbeaten in his first fourteen matches at Borussia Dortmund, Tuchel and his team ended trophyless in the 2015–16 season, despite an appearance in the 2016 DFB-Pokal final, in which they lost to Bayern Munich on penalties. The team also suffered elimination at the quarter-final stage of the UEFA Europa League at the hands of Liverpool, who were now coached by Klopp. However, the campaign was notable for further promotions of youth talent, with American teenager Christian Pulisic largely starring during the latter stages of the season. Dortmund scored 82 goals in the 2015–16 Bundesliga, a club record, and the team's average league possession of 61% and an average pass accuracy of 85% were significant improvements from the team's counterpressing days with Klopp. Their point total of 78 was also the second highest in club history, and would have secured a league title in all but three of the previous 52 seasons. Dortmund finished second in the Bundesliga, securing UEFA Champions League football, however, Tuchel was criticised at the season's end for missing the club's 50th anniversary of their 1966 European Cup Winners' Cup victory.

==== 2016–2017: DFB-Pokal and departure ====
In preparation for the following campaign, Dortmund spent heavily on player purchases, spending a total of €109.75 million in the transfer market; the club was looking to find replacements for important players Mats Hummels, Gündoğan, and Mkhitaryan, who all departed that same summer. Ousmane Dembélé, Marc Bartra, Emre Mor, Mario Götze and Raphaël Guerreiro were notably brought in for a total sum of €64 million. Guerreiro, signed following his successful time at UEFA Euro 2016, was shifted from left-back to midfield by Tuchel. Dortmund went on to return DFB-Pokal final, where Tuchel won his first ever major honor as a coach, as well as the club's first trophy in five years, as they beat Eintracht Frankfurt 2–1, with goals from both Dembélé and Aubameyang. The team finished the season third in the Bundesliga, and was eliminated in the quarter-finals of the Champions League by Monaco.

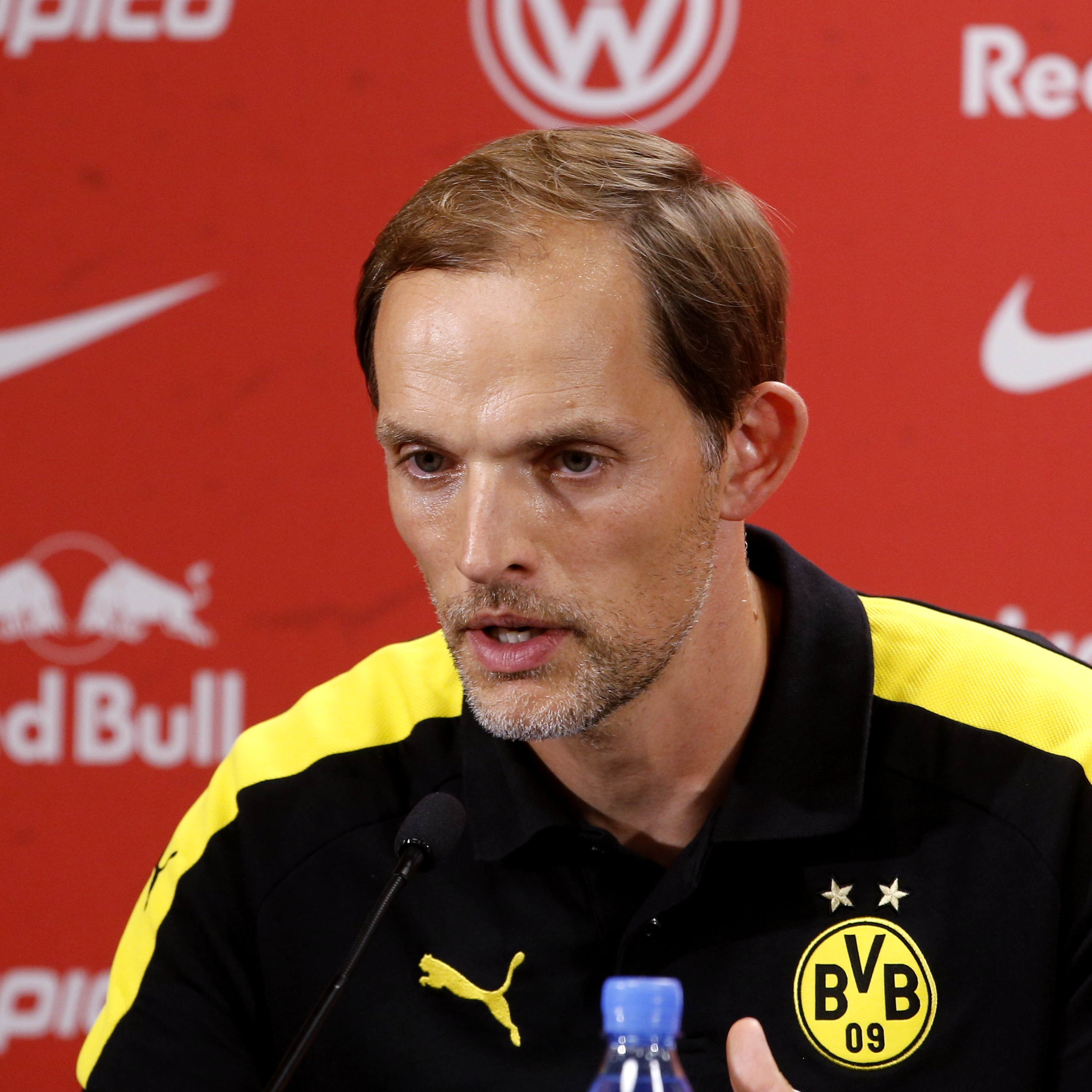
Tuchel at a press conference in 2016

Despite the victory, the DFB-Pokal was to be Tuchel's only honour with the club, as he was dismissed three days later on 30 May 2017. His tenure as first-team coach was marred with controversy, with a strained relationship with the club's hierarchy, notably CEO Hans-Joachim Watzke, who described Tuchel as a "difficult person". Tuchel publicly criticised Watzke after he agreed to UEFA's demand that the club play their Champions League quarter-final first leg match against Monaco on 12 April 2017, one day after the team's bus being bombed. In February 2020, Jan-Henrik Gruszecki, a former ultra who became a consultant to the Dortmund board, claimed Tuchel mistakenly sent an angry text message about sporting director Michael Zorc that was meant to go to Tuchel's agent, Oliver Meinking.

Tuchel also reportedly expressed discontent over transfer activity, with Watzke sanctioning the departures of Hummels, Gündoğan, and Mkhitaryan, despite guarantees they would not leave. Tuchel also maintained fractured relations with club stalwarts Roman Weidenfeller, Neven Subotić, and Jakub Błaszczykowski, and aimed to replace the trio, which Watzke disagreed with. Tuchel aimed to sign defender Ömer Toprak in 2016, a move allegedly blocked by Watzke and chief scout Sven Mislintat, the latter of whom was effectively banished from the training ground after an argument with Tuchel. The club also reportedly chased midfielder Óliver Torres behind Tuchel's back in 2017.

Tuchel left Dortmund with a record of 68 wins, 23 draws, and 17 defeats in 108 games, with a win percentage of 62.96%.

=== Paris Saint-Germain ===
==== 2018–2019: First season in Paris, Ligue 1 title ====
In May 2018, Tuchel signed a two-year contract with Paris Saint-Germain (PSG), replacing Unai Emery. He reportedly rejected Bayern Munich to join PSG.

Tuchel's first move in the transfer market was the permanent signing of Monaco forward Kylian Mbappé for a fee of €180m on 1 July. To offset this large acquisition, and to adhere to UEFA Financial Fair Play regulations, Tuchel sanctioned the departure of several players, including first-team players Yuri Berchiche and Javier Pastore, as well as promising youngster Gonçalo Guedes. After also generating profits through the sales of other bit-part players, the club signed free agent goalkeeper Gianluigi Buffon on 6 July. A month later, the team signed German defender Thilo Kehrer for €37m, and PSG concluded their activity in the summer transfer market by signing Spanish left-back Juan Bernat for €15m on deadline day, while also reuniting Tuchel with former player Choupo-Moting. Despite these acquisitions, Tuchel publicly lamented the club's inability to improve at both full-back areas.

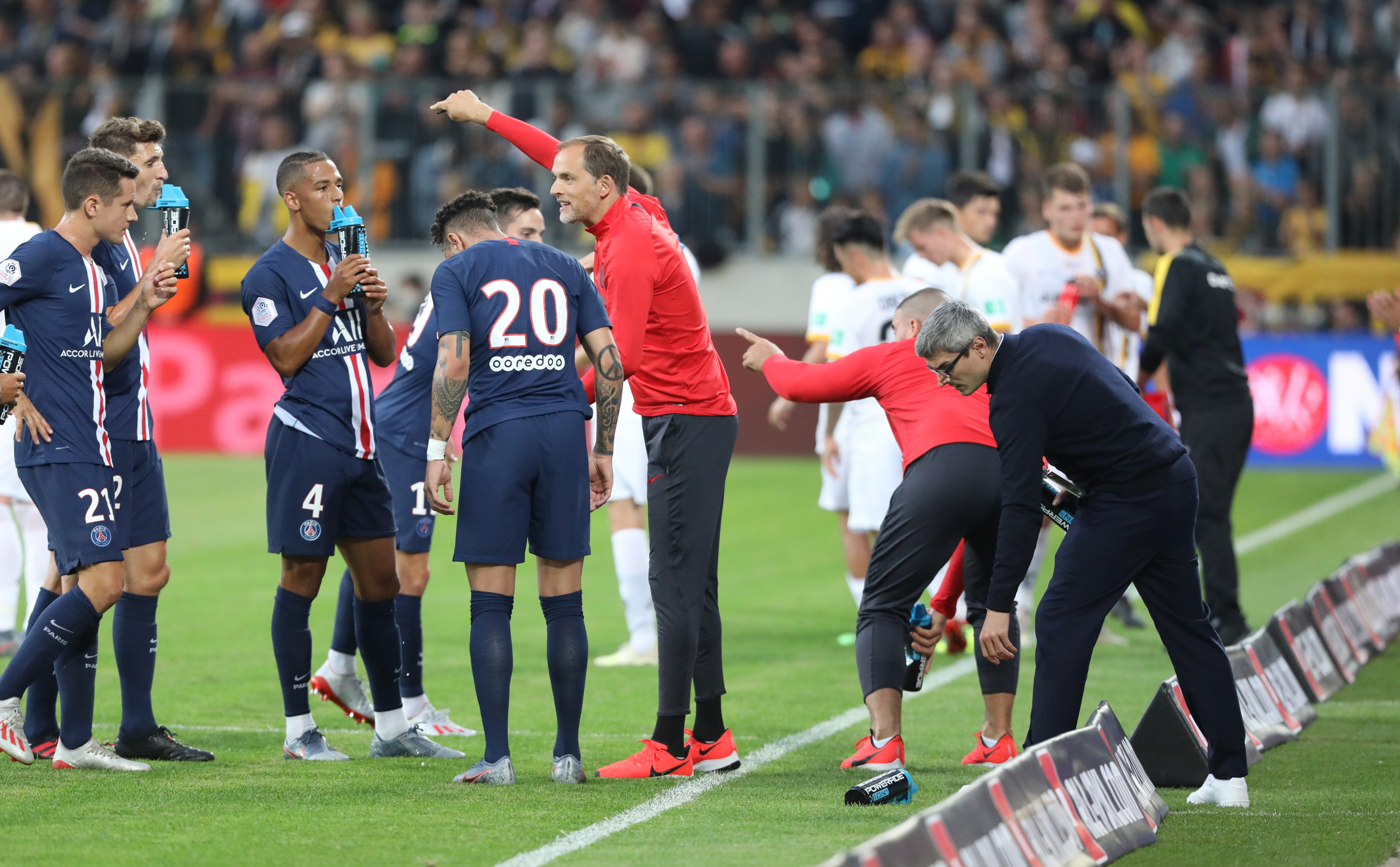
Tuchel coaches Paris Saint-Germain in a friendly against Dynamo Dresden in 2019.

Tuchel's first match in charge also yielded his first honor at the club, as PSG defeated Monaco 4–0 to win the Trophée des Champions on 4 August. He also saw victory in his first league game, as the club defeated Caen 3–0 eight days later. After enjoying a brief unbeaten record, Tuchel suffered his first defeat in Paris on 18 September, losing 2–3 away to Liverpool in a Champions League group stage game. However, by November, Tuchel would break the record for the most wins to start to a domestic league season, as he registered twelve straight victories. The record was later extended to include two additional victories, prior to the club ending its 100% start to the season on 2 December, after PSG drew 2–2 away to Bordeaux. Tuchel then guided PSG to top spot in the club's Champions League group, with a 4–1 win over Red Star Belgrade on 12 December. By securing victory over Nantes on 22 December, Tuchel also broke the record for most points by Christmas in Ligue 1, with 47 after 17 games.

In January 2019, Tuchel was eliminated from his first competition at PSG, falling to Guingamp on 9 January, in the quarter-finals of the Coupe de la Ligue. However, he would defeat the same opposition by a margin of 9–0 ten days later in the league, the biggest home win in PSG's history. Prior to deadline day, on 29 January, the club delved into the winter transfer market to sign Argentine midfielder Leandro Paredes for a rumored fee of €40m. However, these transfers failed to progress the club in Europe, as PSG crashed out of the Champions League in the first knockout round against Manchester United. The club secured a 2–0 victory away from home in the first leg, but lost 1–3 at home, exiting the competition on away goals. With only the league and the Coupe de France to play for, PSG won the former on 21 April, six gameweeks before the end of the season, marking Tuchel's first league title victory as a coach. Six days later, PSG lost the 2019 Coupe de France final to Rennes on penalties, which occurred after a stretch of three consecutive league defeats: this was the first time PSG lost three league games consecutively since 2012.

==== 2019–2020: Domestic quadruple and Champions League final ====
After the season's end, Tuchel signed a one-year contract extension, scheduled to end in 2021. In his second transfer window, Tuchel strayed from recruiting stars and instead pushed for the recruitment of hardworking Spanish midfielders Ander Herrera and Pablo Sarabia, as well as youth prospect Mitchel Bakker. Meanwhile, the club let go of strong personalities in Buffon, Dani Alves, and Adrien Rabiot, and profited from the sales of several fringe players, including Moussa Diaby, Timothy Weah, and Grzegorz Krychowiak. Additionally, the club signed central defender Abdou Diallo from Tuchel's former club Borussia Dortmund, combative midfielder Idrissa Gueye, and completed the transfer of goalkeeper Keylor Navas, as well as a loan move for forward Mauro Icardi, on deadline day. With a number of additional sales, this marked the first transfer window since PSG's takeover by Qatar Sports Investments in 2012 during which the club made a profit in the transfer market.

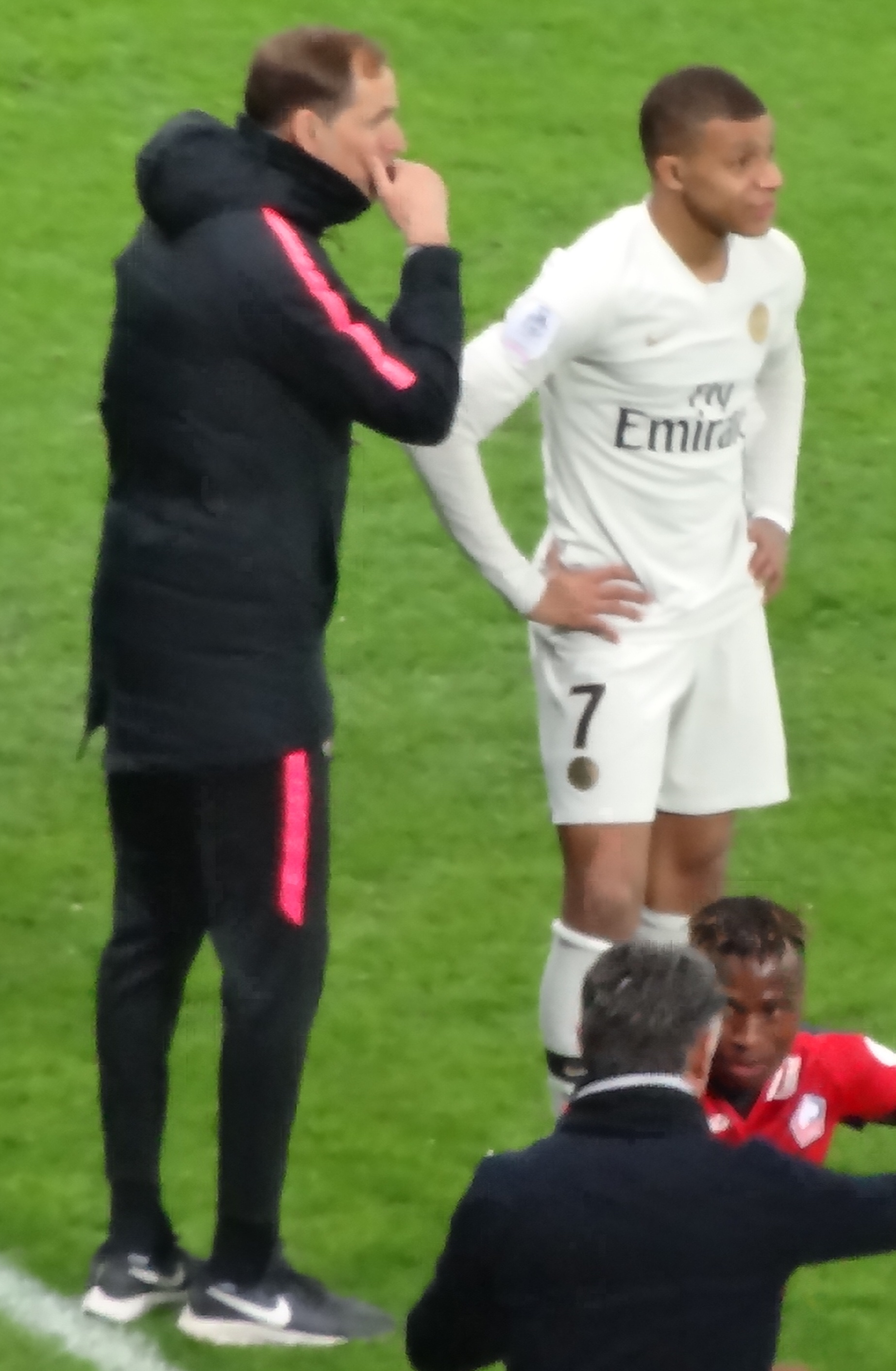
Tuchel with Kylian Mbappé, who was a regular in Tuchel's team

Tuchel began his second season at PSG by retaining the Trophée des Champions on 3 August 2019, in a 2–1 win over Rennes. He also won his first league game of the season, defeating Nîmes 3–0 at home. However, PSG lost 2–1 against Rennes in the club's second league game. In the club's first game in that season's UEFA Champions League, Tuchel received praise for his tactical setup as PSG defeated thirteen-time winners Real Madrid 3–0 at home; the victory occurred without recognised first-team players Neymar, Edinson Cavani, and Mbappé. He later guided the team to qualification to the first knockout stage with two group games to spare, following a 1–0 win over Belgian club Club Brugge on 6 November. Just under three weeks later, Tuchel led the club to top spot in their group after securing a 2–2 draw against Real Madrid. The club then embarked on an unbeaten run, recording a number of high-scoring victories; PSG scored six goals against Linas-Montlhéry and Saint-Étienne in the domestic cup competitions in January, while they scored five against Montpellier in the league. Notably, the latter game contained controversy, as Tuchel was seen to be in a heated conversation with Mbappé following his substitution.

On 18 February 2020, PSG sustained a 2–1 defeat against Tuchel's former club Dortmund in the first leg in the round of 16 in the Champions League. Under a month later, Tuchel guided the club to the last eight, overturning the deficit in a 2–0 victory at home in the second leg. This was the club's first game behind closed doors due to the COVID-19 pandemic; this was the reason the domestic league was canceled on 30 April, while their Champions League fixtures, the Coupe de France, and the Coupe de la Ligue finals were postponed. PSG returned to competitive football on 24 July, winning the Coupe de France after beating Saint-Étienne 1–0 in the final. The game was marred by Kylian Mbappé suffering an ankle sprain, which ruled him out for three weeks. On 31 July, PSG defeated Lyon 6–5 on penalties in the 2020 Coupe de la Ligue final to complete a domestic treble. On 12 August, PSG scored two late goals to beat Atalanta 2–1 in the quarter-finals of the Champions League, marking the club's first appearance in the semi-finals of the competition since the 1994–95 season. In the semi-final, PSG defeated RB Leipzig 3–0 to reach their first ever Champions League final, and their first European final since 1997. They would go on to lose the match by a single goal to Bayern Munich on 23 August.

==== 2020–2021: Final season in Paris ====
In his third transfer window, PSG released a number of players, including club stalwarts Thiago Silva and Cavani. Meanwhile, Mauro Icardi's loan was made permanent for €50 million, and the club supplemented this with the loan acquisitions of Alessandro Florenzi, Danilo Pereira, and Moise Kean. PSG began their league title defence with a 1–0 defeat to newly promoted Lens away on 10 September 2020; the club were missing newly appointed captain Marquinhos, Icardi, Neymar, Mbappé, Navas, Paredes, and Ángel Di María due to COVID-19 protocols or for testing positive for COVID-19. The club went on to lose their second league game by the same scoreline in Le Classique, marking the first time PSG lost their opening two league games since the 1984–85 season. The game became infamous for its disciplinary issues, with 17 cards shown (the most in a single Ligue 1 game in the 21st century), while five were sent off following an injury-time brawl.

Tuchel secured the club's first win of the league season by defeating Metz 1–0 on 16 September, although the game was marred by another red card to PSG. This began a streak of 8 straight wins, before succumbing to a 3–2 away defeat to Monaco on 20 November; another game where PSG saw a red card. After only managing to secure 3 more league wins, and with PSG third in Ligue 1, behind Lyon and eventual winners Lille, Tuchel was dismissed on 24 December, despite placing top of their Champions League group. His dismissal occurred a day after beating Strasbourg 4–0, surprising many at the club, including assistant coach Zsolt Lőw.

Tuchel's tenure at Paris Saint-Germain was marred by a fractured relationship with the club's hierarchy. In an interview with German television station Sport 1, he said he felt "[more like] a politician in sport" than a coach. These comments, as well as his previous criticism over the club's transfer activity, were condemned by PSG's sporting director Leonardo, who said Tuchel "[must] respect the people above [him]", and labelled the comments as damaging for the club. Tuchel and Leonardo reportedly fell out over Leonardo's desire to influence team selection and training regime; the signing of defensive midfielder Danilo Pereira reportedly proved contentious as Tuchel requested a central defender: in response, Tuchel fielded Pereira as a central defender.

Tuchel departed Paris Saint-Germain with a record of 95 wins, 13 draws, and 19 defeats in 127 games, with the best win percentage in Ligue 1 history (75.6%) and the highest average of points per game (2.37, tied with his predecessor Emery). Before leaving Paris, Tuchel facilitated the medical expenses for his housemaid's child's heart surgery and helped her return home to the Philippines by purchasing her family a property in the country.

=== Chelsea ===
It feels very good to be coach here. It has felt like this from the first day and has never changed.

— Tuchel talking about Chelsea in an interview with Sky Sports in 2021.

On 26 January 2021, Tuchel signed an 18-month contract (with the option for an additional year) with Premier League club Chelsea, replacing Frank Lampard. He became the first German to be appointed as head coach of the club. Although expressing a desire to not come in mid-season so as to have a pre-season with his new team, Tuchel accepted the position after Ralf Rangnick rejected the proposal of interim head coach. Tuchel previously interviewed to become Chelsea coach in June 2016, with the club eventually appointing Antonio Conte.

==== 2020–21: Back-to-back European finals and Champions League title ====
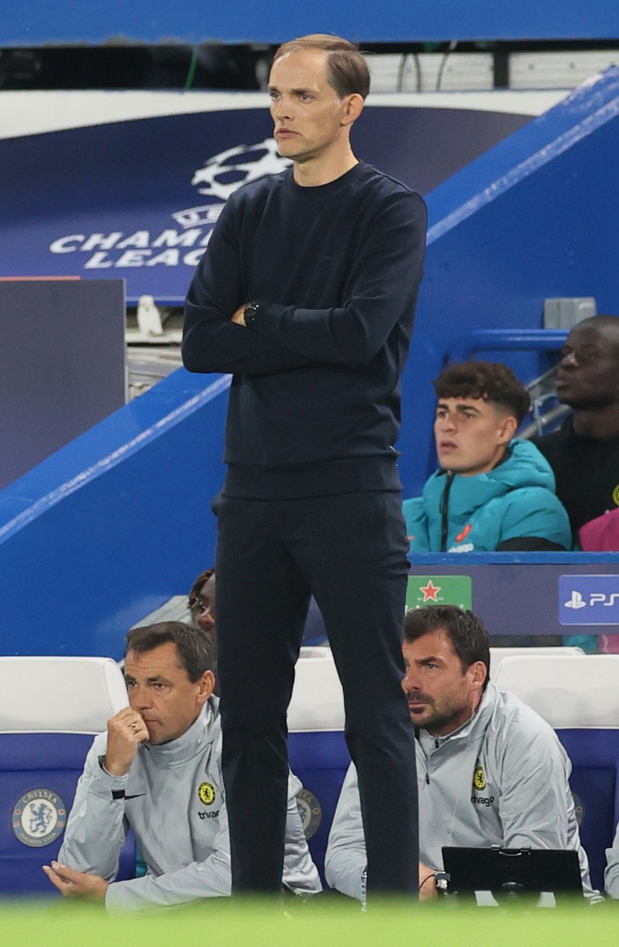
Tuchel with Chelsea in 2021

Tuchel took charge of his first match the following day, a goalless draw at home against Wolverhampton Wanderers, a match that set the record for most possession (78.9%) and passes completed (820) for a manager's first Premier League game. Tuchel won his first game on 31 January, defeating Burnley 2–0 at home, and then won his first London derby (and his first away game) by defeating Tottenham Hotspur 1–0 on 4 February. On 11 February, Tuchel guided Chelsea to the quarter-finals of the FA Cup with a 1–0 away win over EFL Championship side Barnsley, extending his unbeaten run to five games. This run was eventually extended to eight games after Chelsea defeated Atlético Madrid 1–0 away in the first leg of the round of 16 in the UEFA Champions League, with Olivier Giroud scoring an overhead kick. This marked Tuchel's first European victory as Chelsea manager.

On 8 March, Tuchel's unbeaten run extended to eleven games after a 2–0 home league win over Everton, becoming the first head coach in Premier League history to keep consecutive home clean sheets in their first five home matches. After a 2–0 home victory against Atlético Madrid in the second leg of the round of 16 in the Champions League on 17 March, Tuchel extended his unbeaten run to 13 games, setting the record for the longest unbeaten run by a new head coach in Chelsea's history. This was considered to be due to the change to a three-man defence and partly attributed to a pragmatic approach to games; Tuchel's team took as many shots as Lampard's team per game (13.8 v 13.9), but created fewer chances, leading to 1.1 goals scored on average per game, compared to 2.1 under Lampard. He was then awarded his first Premier League Manager of the Month in October. The unbeaten run concluded at 14 games, with a 5–2 home defeat against West Bromwich Albion on 3 April. During that 14-game unbeaten run, the club conceded just two goals in 1,260 minutes.

On 17 April, courtesy of a Hakim Ziyech goal, Tuchel led Chelsea to the FA Cup final, defeating league leaders Manchester City 1–0 in the semi-final; Chelsea would eventually lose the final 1–0 to Leicester City. Tuchel also guided Chelsea to the Champions League final following a 3–1 aggregate win over Real Madrid in the semi-finals, becoming the first coach to reach consecutive finals with two different clubs. He eventually led Chelsea to European glory with a 1–0 win over Manchester City in the final. Following this, Tuchel signed a contract extension, with his new contract due to run to 2024.

==== 2021–22: Club World champion, Ukraine sanctions, Cup finals ====
In his first transfer window at Chelsea to prepare for the 2021–22 season, the club signed experienced goalkeeper Marcus Bettinelli on a free transfer from West London rivals Fulham on 28 July, thus marking Tuchel's first signing as Chelsea head coach. Tuchel also began incorporating academy player Trevoh Chalobah into the first team, and Chelsea then later re-signed Romelu Lukaku for a club-record £97.5 million (€115 million). He also signed Saúl Ñíguez on a season-long loan from Atlético Madrid (which included an option to buy for £30 million) on deadline day. Chelsea began the season with an eight-game unbeaten streak, winning the UEFA Super Cup, before suffering their first defeat of the season, against Manchester City, on 25 September.

On 20 October, Chelsea recorded their highest scoring victory under Tuchel, a 4–0 home victory over Malmö in the Champions League; this was bettered three days later following a 7–0 win against league strugglers Norwich City. Chelsea then embarked on a 12 match unbeaten run in all competitions, which culminated in a 3–2 away loss against West Ham United on 4 December. A month later, Tuchel led Chelsea to the EFL Cup final following a 3–0 aggregate semi-final victory over city rivals Tottenham Hotspur; Chelsea would go on to lose the final against Liverpool on penalties. On 12 February, after a 2–1 extra time win over Palmeiras, Tuchel won the FIFA Club World Cup, Chelsea's first Club World Cup win.

[I was told] we can go by plane and come back by plane. If not, we go by train. If not, [then] by bus [and] if not, I will drive a seven-seater [car].

— Tuchel, when quizzed about budget restrictions placed on Chelsea.

On 12 March, Chelsea F.C. was frozen as an asset of Roman Abramovich as part of the war sanctions on Russian businesses. Tuchel, who was reluctantly the face of the club amidst off-field turmoil, was praised by Jacob Steinberg of The Guardian for being "a voice of calm and reason throughout the most unsettling period in Chelsea's history". He then reaffirmed his commitment to the club, despite interest from Manchester United and Barcelona, although renewing player contracts was made difficult due to the restrictions, with the deals for Antonio Rüdiger and Andreas Christensen running out at the season's end.

After a six-game win streak in all competitions, Chelsea lost 4–1 at home to newly promoted Brentford on 2 April; the club then registered their highest scoring away win under Tuchel by winning 6–0 at Southampton a week later. However, on 12 April, Chelsea lost 5–4 on aggregate after extra time against Real Madrid and were knocked out of the Champions League, following which, Tuchel criticised several refereeing decisions, including a disallowed goal for Marcos Alonso and referee Szymon Marciniak's "smiling and laughing" with Real Madrid coach Carlo Ancelotti at the game's conclusion. Four days later, Tuchel led Chelsea to their second successive FA Cup final with a 2–0 victory over Crystal Palace. However, Chelsea went on to lose to Liverpool in the final on penalties, repeating the outcome of that year's EFL Cup final three months prior.

==== 2022–23: Dismissal from Chelsea ====
On 30 May 2022, Chelsea were acquired by the American consortium BlueCo, and the club's previous sanctions on acquiring players were lifted. To prepare for the 2022–23 season, Tuchel and Chelsea had spent over £250 million – the highest spend in that season's Premier League and a British record for spending in one transfer window – on Raheem Sterling, Kalidou Koulibaly, Gabriel Slonina, Carney Chukwuemeka, Cesare Casadei, and Pierre-Emerick Aubameyang, as well as near club record outlays on Marc Cucurella and Wesley Fofana. The club also secured the loan of Denis Zakaria on transfer deadline day on 31 August. Several first team players also departed, including Antonio Rüdiger and Marcos Alonso, academy graduates Andreas Christensen and Callum Hudson-Odoi (who left on loan), and former heavy money signings Timo Werner and Romelu Lukaku (who left on loan).

The club began their league season with a 1–0 win over Everton on 6 August 2022. Eight days later, Tuchel was sent off following a 2–2 draw against Tottenham Hotspur after an angry confrontation with Antonio Conte at the end of the match. He was fined £35,000 and given a one-match touchline ban by the Football Association (FA) for improper conduct. Tuchel was subsequently handed an additional £20,000 fine after comments suggesting that referee Anthony Taylor should no longer referee Chelsea matches after he made some controversial decisions in the Tottenham game. The FA stated that Tuchel's comments had constituted improper conduct and that they "imply bias, question the integrity of the match referee, and bring the game into disrepute". On 7 September 2022, Tuchel was dismissed as the team's manager following the club's 1–0 away loss to Dinamo Zagreb in their opening Champions League fixture the previous day (a match attended by new Chelsea chairmen Todd Boehly and Behdad Eghbali); Chelsea also sustained league defeats against Leeds United and Southampton prior to the loss to Dinamo Zagreb.

According to The Athletic, Tuchel was reportedly dissatisfied over his increased involvement in Chelsea's day-to-day transfer activity as a result of the dismissals of club director Marina Granovskaia and technical advisor Petr Čech (with whom Tuchel had a strong working relationship); Tuchel was said to have delegated his presence at recruitment meetings to his agent. Sources close to Tuchel claimed he disagreed with the club's transfer strategy and targets, such as not being involved in the loan signing of Zakaria and that he personally expressed interest in transfers for Matthijs de Ligt, Raphinha, Frenkie de Jong, and Presnel Kimpembe. Sources connected with Chelsea claimed Tuchel was inconsistent regarding transfers, expressing both reluctance and support towards potential moves for Gabriel Jesus, Edson Álvarez, Roméo Lavia, and Cristiano Ronaldo.

Boehly reportedly described Tuchel as a "nightmare" to deal with on recruitment to a Premier League executive. Tuchel had also fallen out with and isolated several first team players, such as Ziyech, Pulisic, Werner, Lukaku, and Hudson-Odoi, from gametime; Tuchel also reportedly argued with Werner following a pre-season defeat to Charlotte FC on 20 July. On his departure, Tuchel wrote an open letter, detailing how he had not anticipated leaving Chelsea "for many years" and saying he felt "honoured to have been a part of [the] club's history" and that "the memories of the last 19 months [would] always have a special place in [his] heart". In March 2023, Tuchel revealed he suspected his dismissal on his morning commute to the training centre, and said the meeting with the ownership "turned out to be very short. It lasted three to five minutes". He reiterated his fondness for his time in England in an interview in May 2024, saying, "It is no secret I loved it at Chelsea, I loved it in England and I loved it in the Premier League. It was a very special time and I remember it very well".

Tuchel departed Chelsea with a record of 60 wins, 24 draws, and 16 defeats in 100 games with a win percentage of 60%, the fourth highest win-rate by a Chelsea manager who managed at least 100 games, after José Mourinho (67.03%), Antonio Conte (65.09%), and Carlo Ancelotti (61.09%). Tuchel was succeeded by Graham Potter.

=== Bayern Munich ===
==== 2022–23: First Bundesliga title ====
On 24 March 2023, Tuchel was announced as head coach at Bayern Munich on a two-year deal, replacing his former player Julian Nagelsmann, who was dismissed. Tuchel was presented at a club press conference the following day, where he said "the squad assembled [here] is one of the most talented and best in Europe. We are here to win all the titles". Four days later, the club made a formal approach to Chelsea first-team assistant coach Anthony Barry, who worked with Tuchel (primarily on set pieces) during his time at Chelsea. Barry joined just under one month later. Tuchel's first game in charge was a 4–2 home win against his old club Borussia Dortmund on 1 April. In his second game, Bayern were knocked out in the quarter-finals of DFB-Pokal, on 4 April, after losing 2–1 at home to SC Freiburg. Bayern were also eliminated in the quarter-finals of the Champions League later that month, losing 4–1 to Manchester City on aggregate.

Despite accumulating five wins from his first eight Bundesliga matches, Bayern lost 3–1 at home to RB Leipzig on 20 May, dropping to second place below Dortmund, with one match remaining in the season. On the final matchday, Dortmund fell to a 2–2 draw at home to Mainz 05, while Bayern won 2–1 away to FC Köln thanks to a late Jamal Musiala winning goal: these results secured an 11th consecutive Bundesliga title for Bayern, and Tuchel's third league title in his career. At the season's end, Bayern dismissed Oliver Kahn as CEO and Hasan Salihamidžić as sporting director: the pair had recruited Tuchel two months prior. In advance of Tuchel's first full season, Bayern recruited defender Kim Min-jae for a reported €50 million and broke the Bundesliga transfer record by signing Harry Kane for €100 million, which was also supplemented by the arrival of backup goalkeeper Daniel Peretz.

==== 2023–24: Champions League semi-finals and departure ====
Bayern lost in 3–0 to RB Leipzig in the 2023 DFL-Supercup on 12 August but began a strong start to the Bundesliga season (which included one defeat in their first sixteen matches), albeit, they were eliminated from the DFB-Pokal in an upset on 1 November against 1. FC Saarbrücken. The team also topped their Champions League group. However, consecutive league defeats to Bayer Leverkusen and VfL Bochum in February 2024 left them eight points behind Leverkusen by matchweek 22. Bayern were beaten 1–0 by Lazio in the first leg of their Champions League last-16 tie on 14 February, despite enlisting mid-season squad reinforcements in the form of Eric Dier on loan and Sacha Boey for €30 million. This defeat marked Tuchel's tenth in his 43 games, which was as many defeats as Nagelsmann accumulated in his first 84 games. One week later, it was announced Tuchel would mutually depart at the end of the 2023–24 season as part of a "sporting realignment".

Bayern recovered in the second leg on 5 March, defeating Lazio 3–0 to advance to the Champions League quarter-finals. In their next two league games, Bayern scored 13 goals (including recording an 8–1 victory against Tuchel's former club Mainz) but defeats to rivals Borussia Dortmund (Dortmund's first win at the Allianz Arena since 2014) on 30 March and Heidenheim on 6 April (and Leverkusen's victory against Werder Bremen the following week) confirmed Bayern would be unable to win the Bundesliga, their first season without doing so in 11 years. However, the club progressed to the semi-finals of the Champions League (the club's first semi-final appearance since 2020) after defeating Arsenal 3–2 on aggregate on 17 April, with Tuchel receiving praise for implementing a flexible, defensive structure in the midfield and wide areas to disrupt Arsenal's build-up play. He also became the first German coach to reach that stage with three different clubs.

One week later, after Ralf Rangnick confirmed talks to take over as Bayern head coach, club supporters petitioned to retain Tuchel; the petition amassed over 10,000 signatures. A day later, Tuchel reiterated his departure, stating, "[The petition] is not allowed to be a priority as [I am focused] on football, nothing else. I [can't] allow myself to be influenced by it". Bayern were then eliminated from the Champions League in a 2–1 defeat to Real Madrid on 8 May after assistant referee Tomasz Listkiewicz controversially ruled offside on an equaliser from Matthijs de Ligt, with the decision then not checked by video assistant referee (VAR). Tuchel labelled it as "against the rules" and "disastrous" and said it "felt like a betrayal", while de Ligt said that Listkiewicz conceded the decision was made in error. After a 2–0 victory against Wolfsburg four days later, Tuchel's final Bayern game was a 4–2 defeat against Hoffenheim on 18 May: the defeat saw Bayern finish third, their worst league finishing since 2010.

According to The Athletic, Tuchel's departure was influenced by several factors: he was reportedly unable to strike up a bond with a majority of players after "implicitly questioning their credentials" on several occasions. There was criticism for his pragmatic style of play (such as his instruction to fullbacks Raphaël Guerreiro and Noussair Mazraoui to remain deep and forwards Leroy Sané and Musiala to stay wide) to prevent counterattacks after conceding in the first leg of their Champions League knockout tie against Lazio. Tuchel also broke up the previous season's midfield partnership of Joshua Kimmich and Leon Goretzka reportedly on the basis of a lack of defensive balance and wanted to recruit a specialist holding midfielder: a deal to sign João Palhinha collapsed on deadline day. This was also reportedly Tuchel's reasoning for signing Dier, who began to play ahead of de Ligt, while figures at the club noted Tuchel's "disregard for team hierarchy and the status of leaders within the team". Tuchel was also criticised by media outlets for his tactical decisions, who said his style of play was "predicated on individualism" instead of representing a collective effort.

Tuchel denied some of the claims in an interview on 23 February, stating he does not think he is "the only problem" at Bayern and believes the "clarity [from the announcement of his departure] brings freedom". Reports also emerged detailing that Tuchel felt his cautious tactical approach to games was "because he felt he had to, not because he wanted to", with attempts to sideline or sell Goretzka or Kimmich being blocked by the club. Tuchel was also reportedly further limited in his influence on squad composition as, despite being on a joint "transfer committee" featuring former board members Uli Hoeneß and Karl-Heinz Rummenigge, most of Tuchel's desired targets were not signed. In an April 2024 interview with FAZ, Hoeneß accused Tuchel of failing to improve the club's young players and always demanding new signings: in response, Tuchel told Sky Deutschland that his "honour as a coach" had been insulted, and later remarked that people in football are "critical with each other" in Germany and that criticism is "very hard to escape".

=== England ===
On 16 October 2024, Tuchel was announced as head coach of the England national team, with his appointment made on 1 January 2025; Tuchel signed his 18-month contract eight days prior, and after interviewing with Manchester United the previous summer. Tuchel is England's first German and third foreign head coach, after Sven-Göran Eriksson and Fabio Capello. Speaking on his appointment, Tuchel stated, "I have long felt a personal connection to the game in this country" and called taking the position as "a huge privilege". The FA's chief executive Mark Bullingham called Tuchel "one of the best coaches in the world". During his first press conference, Tuchel expressed a desire to play attacking football which "reflects the Premier League", citing principles of physicality, intensity, and directness. The decision was controversial, due to many England fans associating Germany with the Second World War. A national newspaper dubbed his appointment as "A dark day for England". The former Portsmouth manager Harry Redknapp also referred to him as a "German spy".

His backroom team, which was integrated at St George's Park, consisted of his own and existing FA staff: staff included Tuchel's former Chelsea and Bayern Munich assistant coach Anthony Barry, his Chelsea goalkeeping coach Hilário, and his PSG and Bayern Munich performance coach Nicolas Mayer. In February 2025, Brentford coach Justin Cochrane joined as an assistant coach and James Melbourne joined as an analyst from Chelsea. Tuchel's contract reportedly stipulates a financial bonus for winning the FIFA World Cup, and early termination clauses if England failed to reach the quarter-finals of the 2026 World Cup.

==== 2025–2026: 2026 FIFA World Cup ====
In March 2025, Tuchel selected his first 26-man squad for England's initial 2026 FIFA World Cup qualifiers against Albania and Latvia. This included uncapped senior call-ups for Dan Burn, James Trafford, Myles Lewis-Skelly and Jarell Quansah, as well as the return of Marcus Rashford, Jordan Henderson and Reece James to the national team since March 2024, November 2023, and March 2023, respectively. According to Bellingham, Tuchel reached out to 55 players before deciding his final squad, as well as spending three months travelling to club matches to meet potentially selected players. Tuchel led England to a 2–0 victory against Albania on 21 March and to a 3–0 victory over Latvia three days later. Tuchel lost his first game as England coach on 10 June, losing 3–1 in a friendly against Senegal. For his squad for the September 2025 World Cup qualifiers, Tuchel was noted for calling up 24 players rather than the 26 allocated selection spaces, citing his desire for a "tighter, more competitive squad".

On 14 October, Tuchel's England beat Latvia 5–0 away from home, registering a 100% win record for their 2026 FIFA World Cup qualifiers and becoming the first European team to qualify for the 2026 FIFA World Cup. The team did not concede a single goal during qualification, becoming the first European team in history to achieve this. In November, Tuchel spoke on his desire to extend his tenure with England beyond 2026, saying, "[This is] a lot of fun, a lot of fun... There's nothing to announce at the moment, but I am very happy with the way things are going". On 5 December, England were drawn into Group L for the World Cup, alongside Croatia, Ghana, and Panama. England will be based at Swope Soccer Village in Kansas City, Missouri for the duration of the World Cup. On 12 February 2026, it was announced that Tuchel's contract with England was being extended until the end of UEFA Euro 2028, with Tuchel saying he had "loved every minute so far" of the "dream job". In March 2026, England played Uruguay in a 1–1 draw and lost to Japan 0–1 four days later, both in friendlies at Wembley. The fixture against Uruguay was notable for featuring the return of Ben White playing for England since 2022. Prior to the World Cup, England played warm-up fixtures against New Zealand and Costa Rica in June, beating New Zealand 1–0 and Costa Rica 3–0.

On 17 June 2026, Tuchel led England to a 4–2 win over Croatia in their first match at the 2026 World Cup. It was England's first win over a top 15 ranked team at the FIFA World Cup in 24 years since they beat Argentina 1–0 in 2002. On 27 June, he led England to finish top of their group with a 2–0 victory over Panama. After a 2–1 round of 32 victory against DR Congo, Tuchel became the first manager to beat Mexico in a World Cup match at the Estadio Azteca, winning 2–3 on 5 July in the Round of 16. England went onto defeat Norway 2–1 in the quarter-finals on 11 July, which was notable for Tuchel's criticism of England's performance and Jude Bellingham's public riposte, leading to an impromptu team meeting. Four days later, England lost 2–1 in the semi-finals to defending champions Argentina. Tuchel took "personal responsibility" for the defeat and responded to criticism of his defensive tactics after England’s approach following their 1–0 lead, stating, "As soon as you lose, you get criticised... No one knows what would have happened if we made different decisions". He subsequently called the loss a "scar" that is becoming "more and more painful every single day". On 18 July, England won the third place match against France in a historic 6–4 scoreline, England's first competitive win against France since 1982 as well as England's best World Cup finish since 1966 when they won the tournament. Tuchel affirmed his desire to continue with England for Euro 2028. On 15 November, ten man England ended World Champion Spain's world record 43 match unbeaten run with a 3–2 away win. This was Spain's first defeat in Madrid for 39 years.

== Manager profile ==
=== Training methods ===
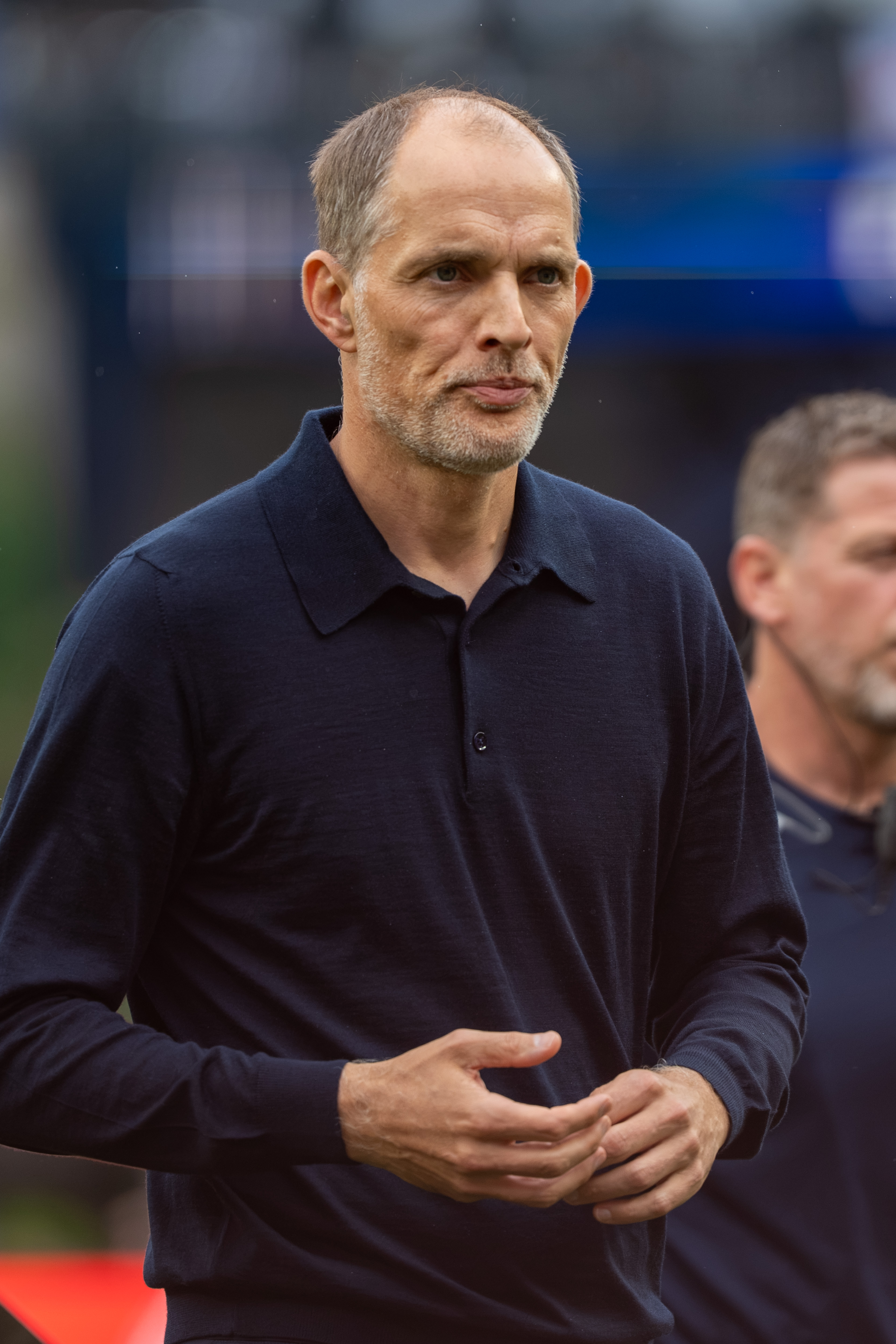
Tuchel during England v Ghana at the 2026 FIFA World Cup

Tuchel is known for his implementation of innovative training methods. During his tenures at Mainz and Dortmund, Tuchel made players take touches with their knees, cut the corners off the training pitch in an effort to force accurate passing and movement, and obliged his players to hold tennis balls during defensive drills to keep unnecessary fouling in check. Training was reportedly made so difficult and mentally exhausting that actual games felt easy in comparison.

A stringent analyst, Tuchel once paused a documentary on Pep Guardiola for two hours on the Mainz bus to study a graph which showed Barcelona's passing patterns. Tuchel has borrowed training methods from other sports, including archery and kick-boxing; he once made his Mainz team spend close to a month training with a handball club. According to Jan Kirchhoff, Tuchel also emphasised psychological training, regularly sharing extracts from newspaper articles or books with his players to challenge their thinking. An initial disciplinarian, Tuchel implemented bans on eating refined carbohydrates, replacing it with wholemeal pasta and light sauces at his clubs. He changed this approach after being appointed at PSG.

Sources close to Chelsea noted Tuchel's training sessions at the club featured a light tone, with a wide range of drills including smaller footballs or using hands instead of feet in some games. He also used staggered recovery, such as lighter sessions after big games or rest days altogether. According to Andreas Christensen, in days leading up to games, training intensity typically increased, with focus on possession over tactical discussion, such as practising three v two passing drills. As England manager, Tuchel was criticised by some media figures for not attending more Premier League matches when considering player selection, prompting Tuchel to defend his methods, saying, "I watch five matches on a wide-angle screen. [Not] watching live [lets] you watch [more matches], tactically, with wide-angles". Tuchel was also noted for allowing players to report closer to fixture dates to reduce fatigue derived from longer lead-in times to those fixtures.

=== Tactics ===
Labelled a "tactical chameleon", Tuchel's tactical knowledge and flexibility has seen wide praise. His footballing style is characterised by flexibility and pragmatism: speaking on his tactical setup in Ben Lyttleton's Edge: What Business Can Learn From Football, Tuchel said, "My [footballing] philosophy is an aesthetic one: "aesthetic" means [to] control the ball, the rhythm, to attack in every minute and to try to score as many goals as possible". Tuchel is known as a tactical innovator and is often favorably compared to Pep Guardiola: the pair once discussed tactics together for over four hours. Tuchel's tactical play earned him the moniker Tommy Tactics among Chelsea supporters.

Writing for The Athletic, Liam Twomey and Sebastian Stafford-Bloor said Tuchel's Mainz side prioritised adaptability in their approach, changing formation or tactical set-up multiple times each game to negate the particular strengths of their opponent. Speaking on this, Tuchel remarked, "We broke all [established] tactical rules [and assumptions] not for the sake of it, but because we were inferior in all aspects [at Mainz] and were forced to". During his time at Dortmund, Tuchel often used the 4–1–4–1 and 4–2–3–1 formations; with the former, he made his team force overloads in space out wide, while with the latter, he looked to create overloads in pockets of space in between the lines of the opposition. He also made the club more ball-dominant, as average possession by the team increased almost 9% following his appointment.

At Paris Saint-Germain, Tuchel primarily played a 4–3–3 with plenty of flair to emphasise the attacking capabilities of wide forwards Neymar and Mbappé (although he used up to ten different formations while at the club). During the 2018–19 season, the forward line, with Neymar and Mbappé flanking central target man Cavani, regularly dropped into the half-space or into wide areas. The team's full-backs would also push up alongside the midfield in order to attain positional overloads, and players were encouraged to find space between the lines of defence and midfield to disorganise the opposition. Simultaneously, this would disrupt attempts to man-mark Neymar and Mbappé and create open space behind the defensive line for the pair to run into.

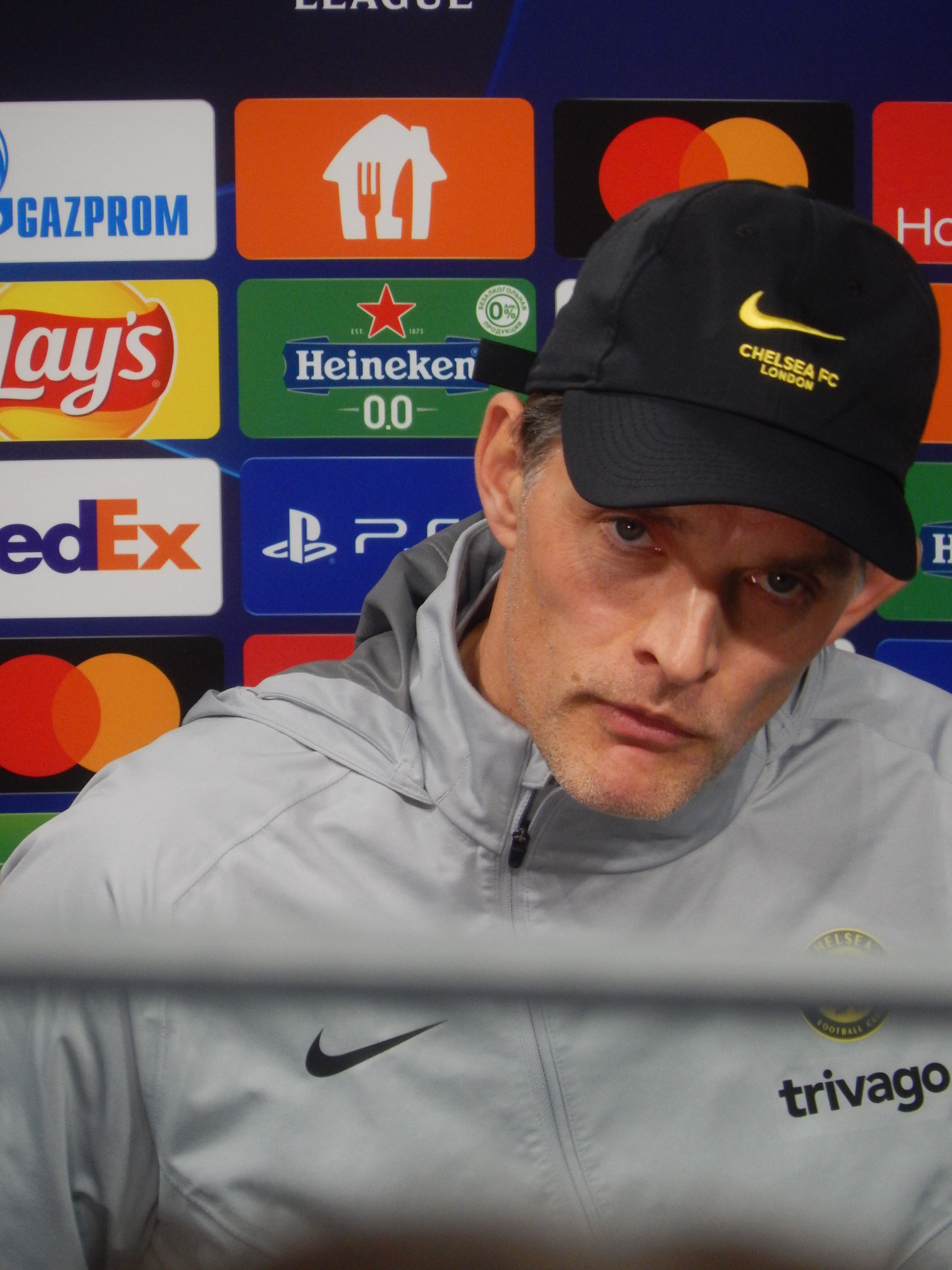
Tuchel in a press conference with Chelsea in Saint Petersburg in 2021

Writing for The Athletic, Thom Harris and Mark Carey stated Tuchel's ideas hinge on controlling possession in midfield and overloading the centre of the pitch with technical players who can both retain the ball and press quickly when it is lost. For example, at PSG, the team's midfield would see the deepest defensive midfielder stick close to the central defenders, who would often be joined by another midfielder acting as a deep-lying playmaker. These roles were occupied by Marquinhos and Marco Verratti, respectively. The last remaining midfielder would push forward to stagger attacks and disrupt defensive structure by overloading one side of the opponent's defensive area, setting an overload passing trap. During the 2018–19 and 2019–20 seasons, Di María and Paredes were commonly associated with this role. The team also heavily used Gegenpressing, a tactic where, after losing possession of the ball, the team would immediately attempt to win it back rather than regroup. PSG would thus corral the opponent to one side before switching play quickly to exploit the weaker side. Tuchel has also been noted for using man-marking, tasking Herrera to do so on Thiago in the 2020 Champions League final.

In the 2018–19 season, following injuries to Neymar, Verratti, and Rabiot, Tuchel sometimes successfully departed from the 4–3–3. In a 4–1 home win against Rennes in January 2019, PSG lined up in a 4–2–2–2 formation; in possession, one defensive midfielder would drop between the central defenders to create a back three while the fullbacks pushed forward. This meant the other midfielder would act as a sweeping defensive presence while the four forwards would stay high and wide, dropping in sporadically to create vertical passing options to break the defensive line. In defence, PSG would retreat to a 5–3–2 formation and readjust to a 4–4–2 to gegenpress.

At Chelsea, Tuchel was known for making frequent player alterations in his early tenure; he made 39 changes to the starting lineup in 10 Premier League games between January and March 2021. He mostly preferred a 3–4–2–1 with ball progression and width largely coming from the wingbacks, a position mainly played by Reece James and Ben Chilwell, while also restoring the ostracised Antonio Rüdiger to a first-team regular, deploying him as a left centre-back in a back three, despite Rüdiger being right-footed: the width provided by the wing-backs enables the rest of the attack to stay narrow ahead of two deeper midfield players to press or counterpress, relying on athletic central defenders (like Rüdiger) to cover any breakdowns. This approach made Chelsea the third-highest scorers from high regains – after Liverpool and Brighton – in the 2021–22 season. The team's general play with the ball was slower and emphasised calm possession in the opposition half to prevent counterattacks: in the same season, only Manchester City conceded fewer goals, shots on target and non-penalty expected goals.

At Bayern Munich, Tuchel reversed this approach: he used a 4-2-3-1 with his full-backs deeper instead of upfield to provide an option in wide areas; Bayern progressed the ball out wide through their wingers. He used an advancing double pivot of Joshua Kimmich and Leon Goretzka to overload opposition spaces when building up to enable progression through the pitch thirds. The central defenders would regularly stretch wide to allow a pivot player or the goalkeeper to step between them and enable greater coverage of the pitch to progress the ball. This approach yielded a European-best 1.6 expected goal (xG) difference per game, which measures both the quality of chances created and conceded by a team. However, according to Mark Carey of The Athletic, Tuchel's approach at Bayern struggled when facing low-block teams who denied Bayern space to create, while also stating the team was vulnerable on the counter-attack if they committed more players forward: the club registered three shock defeats with 65% ball possession that season and conceded 10 goals via counter-attacks, the fifth-highest in the league. Carey also labelled the club's relative better performance in the Champions League that season to the team's approach working against clubs willing to attack them, as opposed to those who sat back. He also said Tuchel succeeded in making "subtle [tactical] tweaks in crucial moments" to win games at Bayern.

=== Reception ===
Klopp, his contemporary, commenting on Tuchel's "exceptional" rise through the ranks remarked, "He's an outstanding coach and an outstanding manager". Guardiola also expressed his admiration for Tuchel's footballing philosophy, saying, "He's so creative. One of the few managers I learn from. Excellent in all departments. I enjoy watching his teams, the way he plays [and] his approach". Hansi Kleitsch, the head coach of the various youth teams at VfB Stuttgart when Tuchel was an assistant coach, said, "[Tuchel] was able to dissect an opponent, he had X-ray vision. His match plans always worked out". In an assessment of Tuchel's coaching style, Rangnick said, "Tuchel is a very bright, intelligent person. He's somebody who loves to improve people".

Tuchel is known for his aptitude and positive response to new footballing trends and ideas: after leaving Mainz, Tuchel visited Matthew Benham, owner of then-Championship club Brentford, to learn about statistical models. Tuchel also sought out online tactical blogs instead of established coaches to inform his footballing ideas: he later hired René Marić of Spielverlagerung at Borussia Dortmund to compile scouting reports. At Borussia Dortmund, he introduced the concept of "differential learning" patented by sport scientist Wolfgang Schollhorn, which informs that player skill is not honed by repetition but by confronting an ever-changing set of problems which demands constant adjustments. During his time with England, Tuchel borrowed verbiage from American football coach Bill Callahan for team speeches, and adopted Bill Belichick's squad composition philosophy, highlighting a desire not to "collect talent" but to "build a team"; according to Jack Pitt Brooke of The Athletic, Tuchel's eventual squad selection for the 2026 FIFA World Cup prioritised players who would be "good tourists, popular and selfless" within the team.

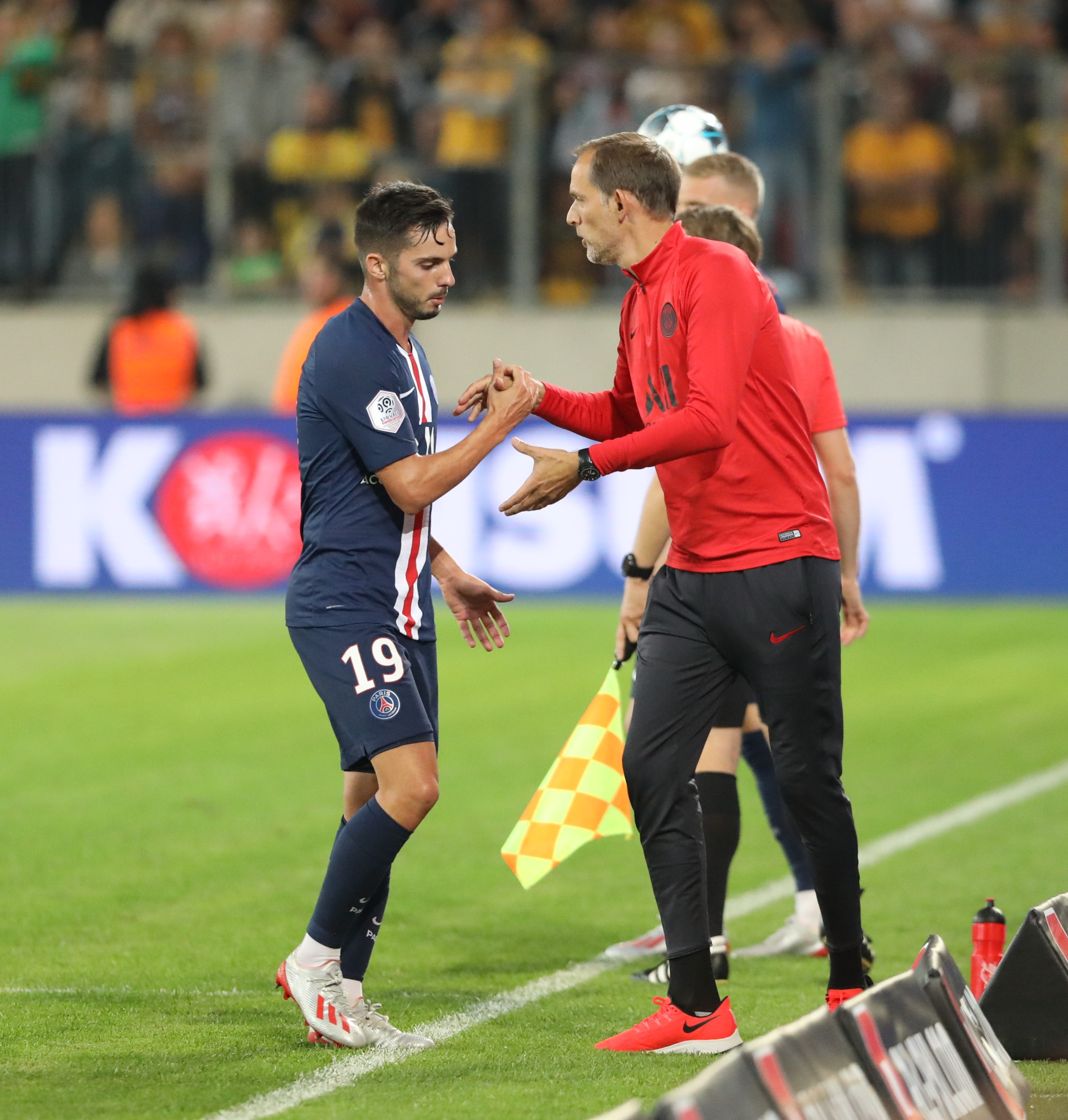
Tuchel (right) with Pablo Sarabia in 2019

In November 2021, Barney Ronay wrote in The Guardian that "Tuchel's acuity, his tendency in pre- and post-match TV appearances to blurt out original thoughts, to riff on the spot, turning this thing around in his hand, seeing its edges" is a microcosm of his footballing approach. Ronay also opined that Tuchel demonstrates "restless intelligence, [an] obsession with detail, with football as a play of shapes and numbers and ideas". Gonzalo Castro, who played under Tuchel, said, "[Tuchel] organises everything precisely, down to the last millimetre". Tuchel is known as a fierce motivator. At Mainz, during a bike tour up a mountain, Tuchel buried the club badge and told the youth team that if they reached the 2009 U-19 Bundesliga final, he would retrieve it; according to under-19 player Konstantin Fring, "We all had goosebumps. We would have killed someone for him [when he retrieved it]. We wanted to win so much. And we did". Tuchel went on to retrieve the badge.

Nikolče Noveski, who played under Tuchel and Klopp, said that "for Klopp, creating a positive atmosphere was key. Thomas was more interested in the finer details; his preparation for games was unparalleled... He is a perfectionist, isn't afraid to challenge people and can be direct despite potential conflict". Speaking on his management style, Marcus Bettinelli noted Tuchel emphasises personableness with playing and non-playing staff, saying, "...whether you're the chef, the bin man or gardener [you can] feel the atmosphere. He likes to ask how your family are, how you're doing. It's small things like that [which] help you feel comfortable". Chelsea captain César Azpilicueta said that Tuchel's man management was key in bringing success for Chelsea. Sources close to Chelsea noted Tuchel's strong communication skills with players and light tone; to assimilate with the playing squad, Tuchel regularly organised external team outings and activities, including cooking them Weißwürste and pretzels. As England manager, Tuchel regularly texted potential call-ups, with discussions ranging the player's recent matches and performances to offering support during a difficult run of form. During the 2026 World Cup, he referenced the lesser used members of the England squad as a "special-operations team", who would play with the starters to facilitate certain outcomes.

Tuchel has been criticised for having a harsh approach. In 2021, a video emerged depicting Tuchel berating Shawn Parker while coaching him at Mainz in 2014. Tuchel reportedly screamed, "Shut your mouth!" at Emre Mor after the player refused to implement Tuchel's training instructions: Mor was later ostracised from the team. Writing for The Athletic, Simon Johnson reported Tuchel gave "brutal" criticism to some Chelsea players for failing to carry out his tactics, causing tension in the squad. This reportedly exacerbated as results dipped in his final season at the club. Mainz's goalkeeper Heinz Müller called him "a dictator". In 2021, Christian Heidel, Mainz's long-time executive and sporting director, defended Tuchel from criticism, saying, "[Tuchel] is not easy to deal with, but all good coaches are complicated. [This] means they are tough [and] make demands of those around them [and] for that reason, they are incredible coaches". Former Borussia Dortmund goalkeeper Roman Weidenfeller later commented on his experience with Tuchel, saying, "In a sporting sense, Tuchel is untouchable. His training sessions were outstanding, he was a visionary. But on a human level, it didn't work in some areas". Tuchel's agent Oliver Meinking also remarked on Tuchel's difficult demeanour, saying, "[his] energy has the greatest impact, but there's also a problematic side to it. It's often all or nothing with him". Julian Nagelsmann, who played under Tuchel, said he is the type of coach who "gets on super-well with people or not at all".

== Personal life ==
As a child, Tuchel was a "huge" fan of football, and his first footballing idol was Hans-Günter Bruns.

Tuchel attended Simpert-Kraemer-Gymnasium, where he devised tactical strategies in PE volleyball. He graduated from Baden-Württemberg Cooperative State University with a degree in business administration, and worked as a bartender at the Radio Bar in Stuttgart while a student.

Tuchel married his wife Sissi, with whom he has two daughters, in 2009. In April 2022, it was reported that the couple had divorced, citing irreconcilable differences. Tuchel is currently in a relationship with Natalie Max. He speaks German, French and English, and describes himself as an "imperfect vegetarian". Tuchel consumes minimal amounts of alcohol. He considers himself an avid reader, namely of crime thriller novels and books about architecture and design, and is also a fan of tennis, rock music, and hip hop.

== Managerial statistics ==
As of match played 15 November 2026

Managerial record by team and tenure
| Team | From | To | Record | | | | | Ref. |
| Team | From | To | P | W | D | L | Win % | Ref. |
|---|---|---|---|---|---|---|---|---|
| FC Augsburg II | 1 July 2007 | 30 June 2008 | 34 | 20 | 8 | 6 | 58.8 | |
| Mainz 05 | 3 August 2009 | 11 May 2014 | 184 | 72 | 46 | 66 | 39.1 | |
| Borussia Dortmund | 29 June 2015 | 30 May 2017 | 107 | 67 | 23 | 17 | 62.6 | |
| Paris Saint-Germain | 14 May 2018 | 24 December 2020 | 127 | 95 | 13 | 19 | 74.8 | |
| Chelsea | 26 January 2021 | 7 September 2022 | 100 | 60 | 24 | 16 | 60.0 | |
| Bayern Munich | 24 March 2023 | 18 May 2024 | 61 | 37 | 8 | 16 | 60.7 | |
| England | 1 January 2025 | Present | 28 | 22 | 2 | 4 | 78.6 | |
| Career total | | | 641 | 373 | 124 | 144 | 58.2 | |

== Honours ==
=== Manager ===
Borussia Dortmund

- DFB-Pokal: 2016–17

Paris Saint-Germain

- Ligue 1: 2018–19, 2019–20
- Coupe de France: 2019–20; runner-up: 2018–19
- Coupe de la Ligue: 2019–20
- Trophée des Champions: 2018, 2019
- UEFA Champions League runner-up: 2019–20

Chelsea

- UEFA Champions League: 2020–21
- UEFA Super Cup: 2021
- FIFA Club World Cup: 2021
- FA Cup runner-up: 2020–21, 2021–22
- EFL Cup runner-up: 2021–22

Bayern Munich

- Bundesliga: 2022–23

England

- FIFA World Cup third place: 2026

Individual

- VDV Bundesliga Coach of the Season: 2015–16
- Premier League Manager of the Month: March 2021, October 2021
- German Football Manager of the Year: 2021
- UEFA Men's Coach of the Year: 2020–21
- IFFHS Men's World's Best Club Coach: 2021
- The Best FIFA Football Coach: 2021
