= Kerem Demirbay =

German footballer (born 1993)

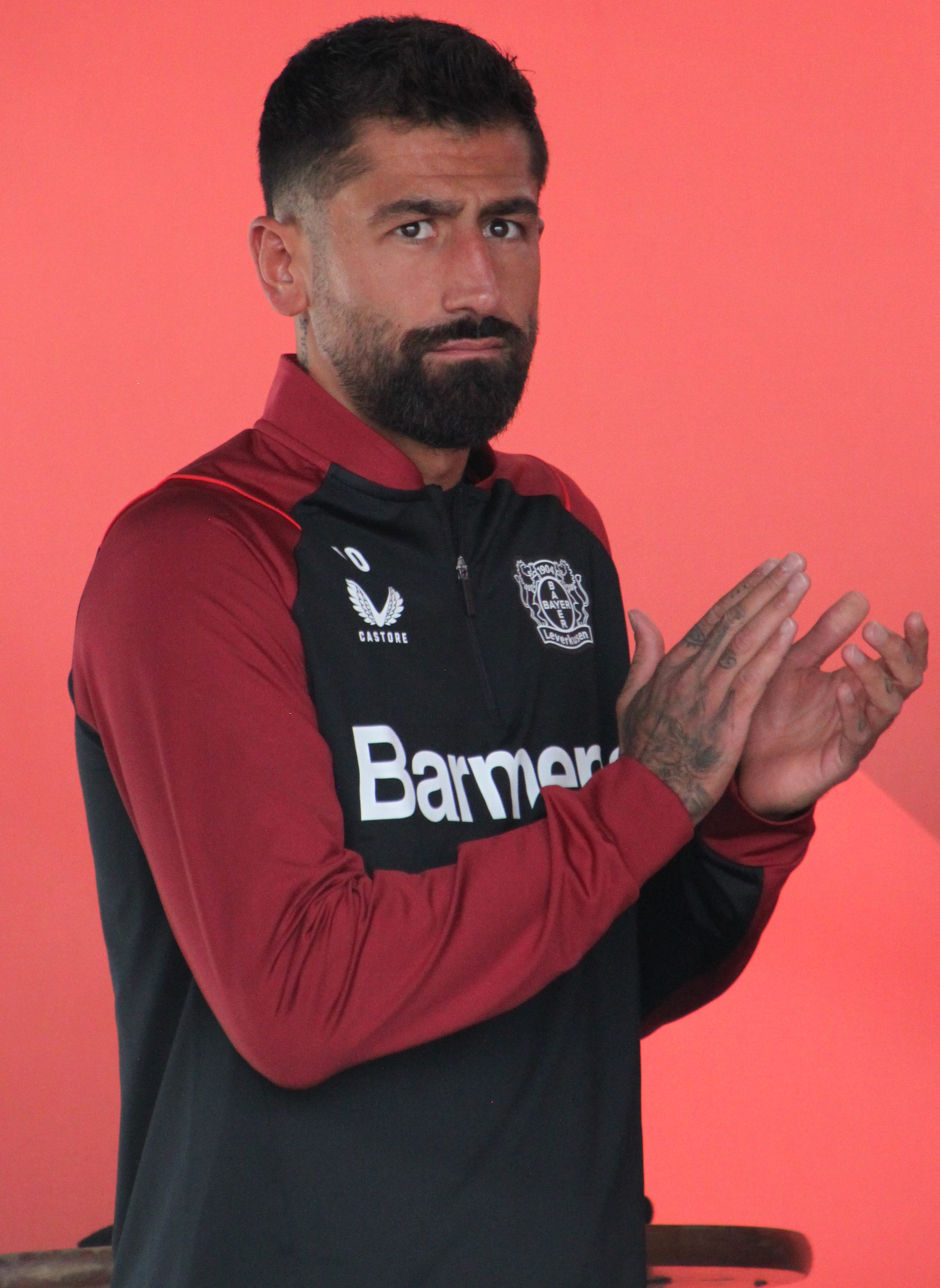
- Demirbay with Bayer Leverkusen in 2022

Personal information
- Full name: Kerem Demirbay
- Date of birth: 3 July 1993 (age 33)
- Place of birth: Herten, Germany
- Height: 1.83 m (6 ft 0 in)
- Position: Midfielder

Team information
- Current team: Kasımpaşa
- Number: 26

Youth career
- 1999–2007: Schalke 04
- 2007–2008: Borussia Dortmund
- 2008–2011: SG Wattenscheid 09
- 2011–2012: Borussia Dortmund

Senior career*
Years	Team	Apps	(Gls)
2012–2013	Borussia Dortmund II	28	(2)
2013–2016	Hamburger SV	3	(0)
2013–2014	Hamburger SV II	6	(4)
2014–2015	→ 1. FC Kaiserslautern (loan)	22	(1)
2015–2016	→ Fortuna Düsseldorf (loan)	25	(10)
2016–2019	TSG Hoffenheim	73	(12)
2019–2023	Bayer Leverkusen	108	(10)
2023–2025	Galatasaray	54	(6)
2025–2026	Eyüpspor	16	(0)
2026–	Kasımpaşa	21	(1)

International career^{‡}
2011–2012	Turkey U19	7	(1)
2012–2013	Turkey U20	3	(0)
2013	Turkey U21	2	(0)
2017	Germany	2	(1)
Medal record
Representing Germany
FIFA Confederations Cup
Winner	2017
- * Club domestic league appearances and goals as of 6 November 2026 ‡ National team caps and goals as of 25 June 2017

Kerem Demirbay (born 3 July 1993) is a German professional footballer who plays as a midfielder for Süper Lig club Kasımpaşa. He is nicknamed "Dayı" due to his resemblance of a popular Turkish TV show fictional character. A former youth international for Turkey, Demirbay switched allegiances to represent Germany at senior level.

== Early life and career ==
Demirbay was born in Herten, North Rhine-Westphalia. He began playing club football with FC Schalke 04 in 1999. After several years with the club, he continued his training with Borussia Dortmund and SG Wattenscheid 09.

== Club career ==
=== Borussia Dortmund ===
After spending a year in their youth setup, Demirbay was promoted to Borussia Dortmund II playing in third tier 3. Liga. On 21 July 2012, the first matchday of the 2012–13 season, he came to his debut in professional football in an away game against VfL Osnabrück, replacing Konstantin Fring from the bench. He scored in the 1–2 home defeat against 1. FC Saarbrücken.

=== Hamburger SV ===
In the 2013–14 winter break, he agreed to join Hamburger SV on a free transfer in July 2014. After injury issues and several caps for their second team in fourth tier Regionalliga, he made his Bundesliga debut in the 1–3 home defeat by VfL Wolfsburg on 19 April 2014.

=== 1. FC Kaiserslautern ===
Although performing well in 2014–15 pre-season games, he moved to 2. Bundesliga side 1. FC Kaiserslautern on a season long loan to in August 2014. There he became a first team regular, starting in 18 matches and being put in another four times.

=== Fortuna Düsseldorf ===
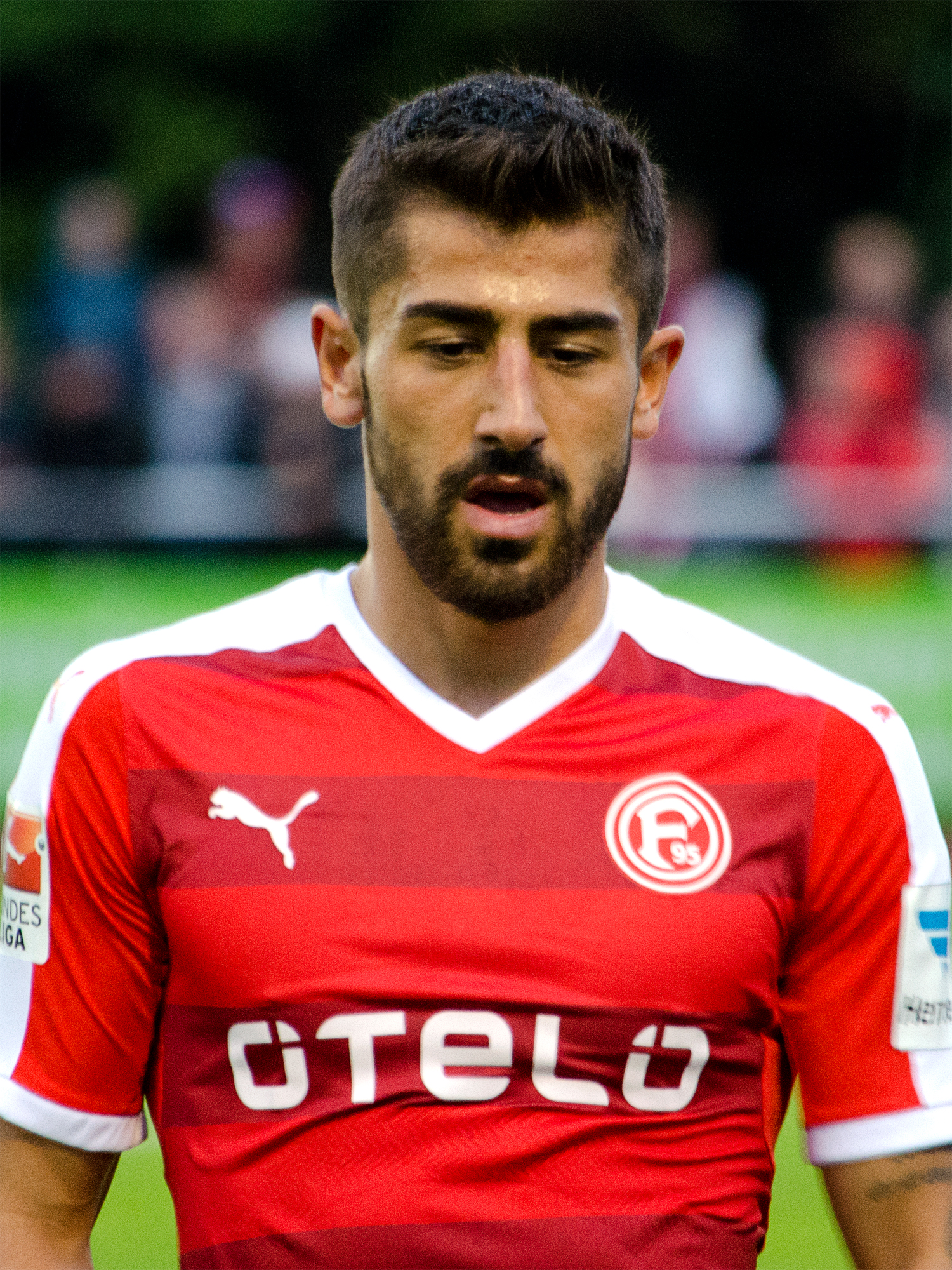
Demirbay with Düsseldorf in 2015

Returning to Hamburg, he again played pre-season, before signing on a season long loan to Fortuna Düsseldorf on 25 August 2015.

During his time at Fortuna, Demirbay achieved international notoriety for making a sexist comment against female referee Bibiana Steinhaus, in violation of league rules. In November 2015, after being sent off by Steinhaus in a match between Fortuna Düsseldorf and FSV Frankfurt, he told her "women have no place in men's football". Demirbay telephoned Steinhaus after the match to apologise. As a sanction for his behaviour, he was given a five-game ban and was made to referee a junior league girls' football match.

=== 1899 Hoffenheim ===
In June 2016, Demirbay signed for 1899 Hoffenheim on a three-year contract for a reported fee of €1,700,000. He was handed the number 10 shirt. In April 2016, Demirbay scored the all-important equalising goal against 1. FC Köln that earned the club from Sinsheim their first ever European qualification.

=== Bayer Leverkusen ===
On 9 May 2019, Bayer Leverkusen announced that Demirbay would end his stint at Hoffenheim, and would move to the BayArena at the start of the summer transfer window in a five-year deal until 30 June 2024. Leverkusen reportedly triggered a release clause in Demirbay's Hoffenheim contract by paying a €32 million or €28 million fee, depending on the source.

=== Galatasaray ===
On 1 August 2023, Galatasaray announced that Demirbay had arrived in Istanbul to complete his permanent transfer to Turkey. On 3 August, he signed a 3-year contract with Galatasaray. Galatasaray agreed to pay €3.7m transfer fee to the former club of the football player Bayer Leverkusen for this transfer.

=== Eyüpspor ===
On 2 July 2025, Demirbay joined fellow Turkish side Eyüpspor.

=== Kasımpaşa ===
On 15 January 2026, Demirbay joined Kasımpaşa.

== International career ==
=== Youth ===
Although not having a Turkish passport, Demirbay played international youth football for the Turkish Football Association. In March 2015, he was chosen by Germany U21 coach Horst Hrubesch, but was excluded from games due to injury. He was then selected for 2015 UEFA European Under-21 Championship in the Czech Republic, but did not play in any of the games.

=== Senior ===
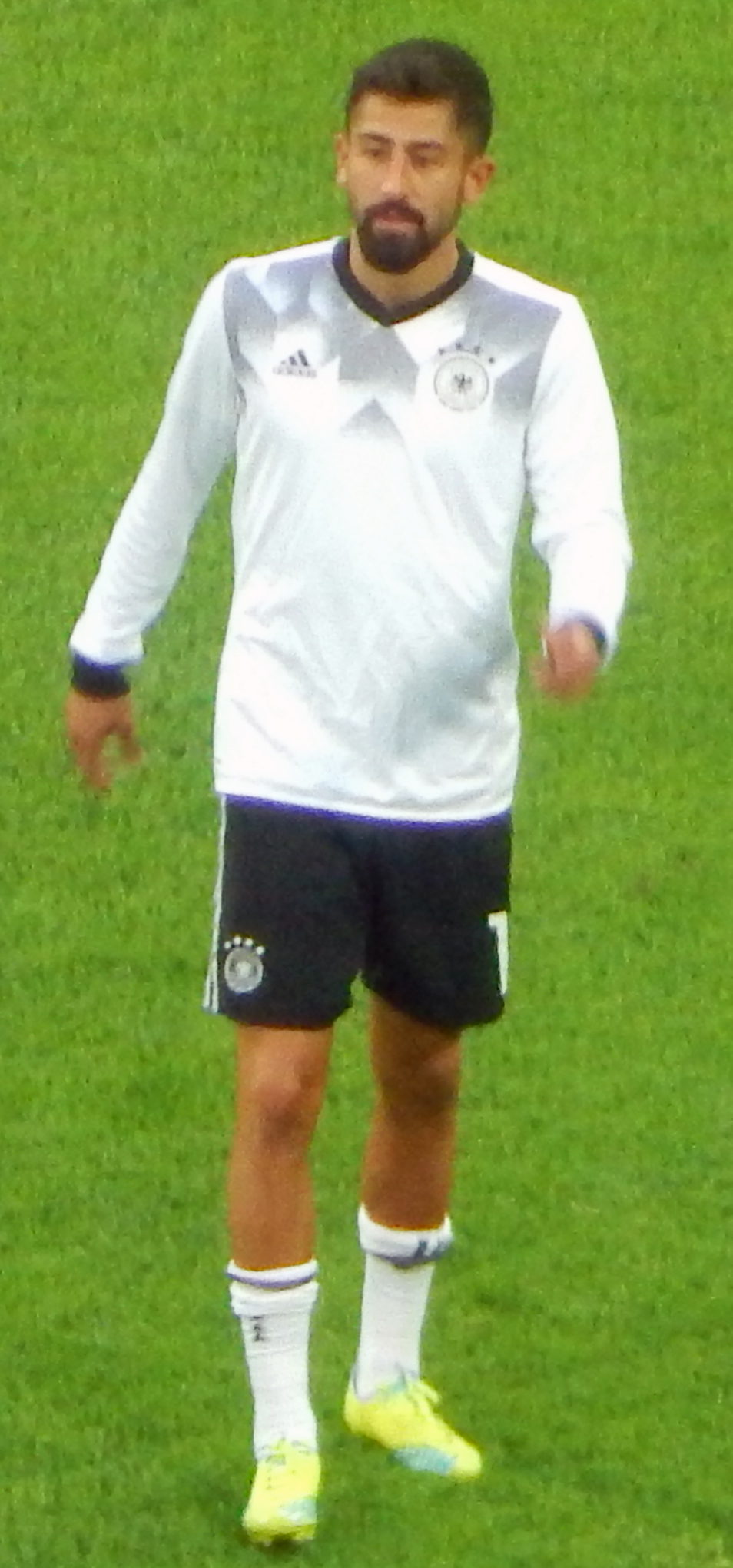
Demirbay with Germany during the 2017 FIFA Confederations Cup

Demirbay accepted a callup to the Turkey national football team on 17 May 2017, for a 2018 FIFA World Cup qualification against Kosovo, but rescinded the offer. Later in the same day, Demirbay accepted a callup to the Germany national team for the friendly against Denmark on 6 June 2017, for the 2018 World Cup qualification match against San Marino on 10 June 2017 and for the 2017 Confederations Cup to be held from 17 June to 2 July 2017.

Demirbay made his international debut on 6 June against Denmark, where he was subbed on in the 77th minute for Leon Goretzka.

== Career statistics ==
=== Club ===
As of match played 6 November 2026

Appearances and goals by club, season and competition
Club	Season	League			National cup (Note: Includes DFB-Pokal, Turkish Cup)		Europe		Other		Total	
Club	Season	Division	Apps	Goals	Apps	Goals	Apps	Goals	Apps	Goals	Apps	Goals
Borussia Dortmund II	2012–13	3. Liga	28	2	—		—		—		28	2
Hamburger SV II	2013–14	Regionalliga Nord	5	3	—		—		—		5	3
Hamburger SV II	2014–15	Regionalliga Nord	1	1	—		—		—		1	1
Hamburger SV II	Total		6	4	—		—		—		6	4
Hamburger SV	2013–14	Bundesliga	3	0	0	0	—		0	0	3	0
1. FC Kaiserslautern (loan)	2014–15	2. Bundesliga	22	1	1	0	—		—		23	1
Fortuna Düsseldorf (loan)	2015–16	2. Bundesliga	25	10	1	1	—		—		26	11
TSG Hoffenheim	2016–17	Bundesliga	28	6	1	0	—		—		29	6
TSG Hoffenheim	2017–18	Bundesliga	19	2	2	0	6 (Note: Two appearances in UEFA Champions League, four appearances in UEFA Europa League)	0	—		27	2
TSG Hoffenheim	2018–19	Bundesliga	26	4	1	0	5 (Note: Appearances in UEFA Champions League)	0	—		32	4
TSG Hoffenheim	Total		73	12	4	0	11	0	—		88	12
Bayer Leverkusen	2019–20	Bundesliga	25	1	6	0	9 (Note: Five appearances in UEFA Champions League, four appearances and one goal in UEFA Europa League)	1	—		40	2
Bayer Leverkusen	2020–21	Bundesliga	29	4	3	0	5 (Note: Appearances in UEFA Europa League)	1	—		37	5
Bayer Leverkusen	2021–22	Bundesliga	29	1	2	2	5	0	—		36	3
Bayer Leverkusen	2022–23	Bundesliga	25	4	1	0	10 (Note: Five appearances in UEFA Champions League, five appearances and one goal in UEFA Europa League)	1	—		36	5
Bayer Leverkusen	Total		108	10	12	2	29	3	—		149	15
Galatasaray	2023–24	Süper Lig	34	6	2	0	6 (Note: Four appearances in UEFA Champions League, two appearances and one goal in UEFA Europa League)	1	0	0	42	7
Galatasaray	2024–25	Süper Lig	20	0	3	0	10 (Note: One appearance in UEFA Champions League, nine appearances in UEFA Europa League)	0	1 (Note: Appearance in Turkish Super Cup)	0	34	0
Galatasaray	Total		54	6	5	0	16	1	1	0	76	7
Eyüpspor	2025–26	Süper Lig	16	0	0	0	—		—		16	0
Kasımpaşa	2025–26	Süper Lig	11	1	—		—		—		11	1
Kasımpaşa	2026–27	Süper Lig	10	0	0	0	—		—		10	0
Kasımpaşa	Total		21	1	0	0	—		—		21	1
Career total			356	46	23	3	56	4	1	0	436	53

=== International ===
As of match played 25 June 2017

Appearances and goals by national team and year
National team	Year	Apps	Goals
Germany
Germany	2017	2	1
Total		2	1

As of match played 25 June 2017. Germany score listed first, score column indicates score after each Demirbay goal.

List of international goals scored by Kerem Demirbay
No.	Date	Venue	Opponent	Score	Result	Competition
1	25 June 2017	Fisht Olympic Stadium, Sochi, Russia	Cameroon	1–0	3–1	2017 FIFA Confederations Cup

== Honours ==
Galatasaray

- Süper Lig: 2023–24, 2024–25
- Turkish Cup: 2024–25
- Turkish Super Cup: 2023

Germany

- FIFA Confederations Cup: 2017
