= Fring =

Fring may refer to:

- Fring, Norfolk, an English parish
- Konstantin Fring (born 1990), German footballer
- Gus Fring, a fictional character in the American television drama series Breaking Bad and Better Call Saul

== See also ==
- Frings (disambiguation)
