= René Marić =

Austrian manager

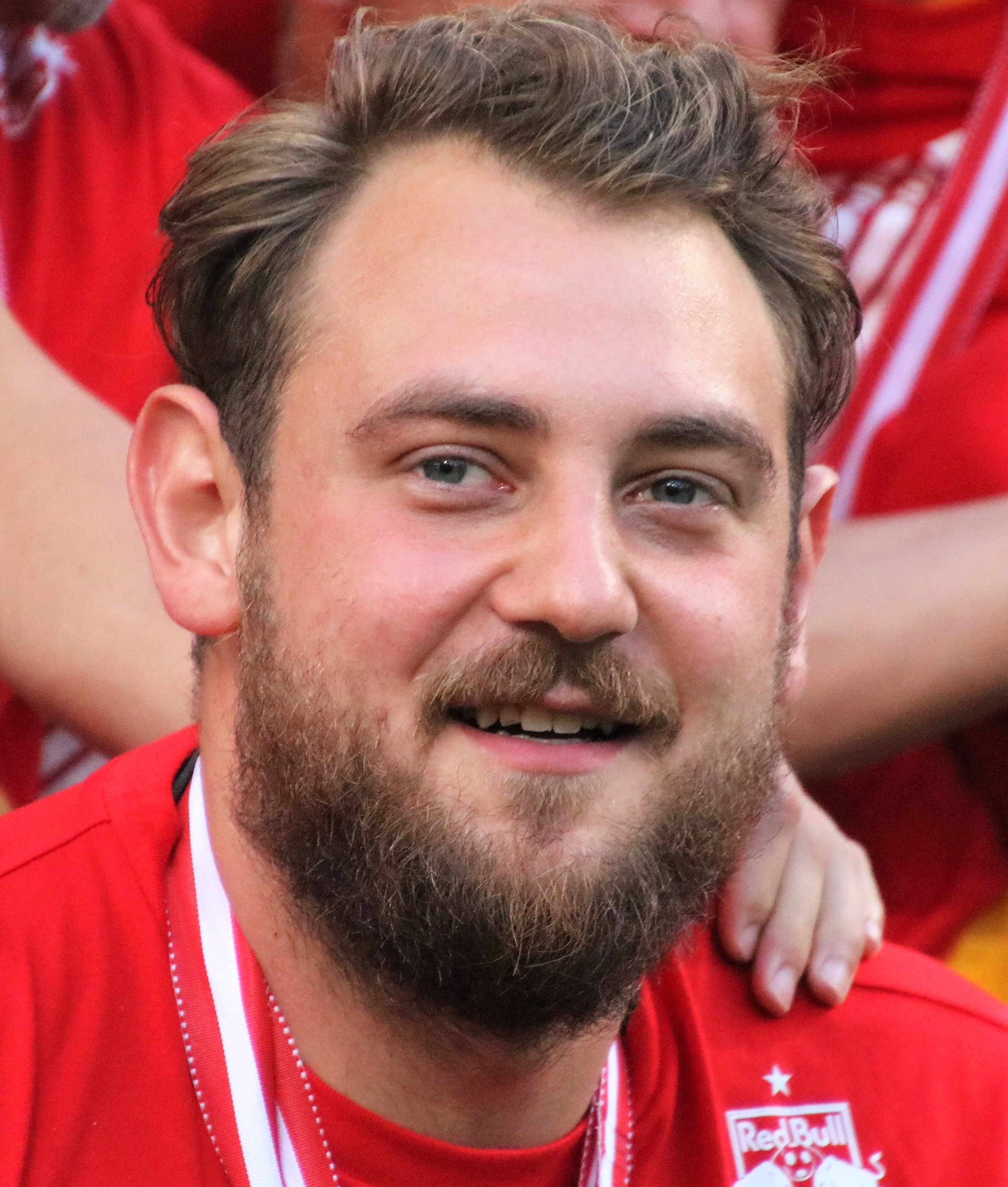
- Marić with RB Salzburg in 2019

Personal information
- Date of birth: 4 September 1992 (age 34)
- Place of birth: Oberndorf bei Salzburg, Salzburg, Austria

Team information
- Current team: Bayern Munich (assistant)

Managerial career
- Years: Team
- 2009–2016: TSU Handenberg
- 2016–2017: Red Bull Salzburg U18 (assistant)
- 2017–2019: Red Bull Salzburg (assistant)
- 2019–2021: Borussia Mönchengladbach (assistant)
- 2021–2022: Borussia Dortmund (assistant)
- 2022–2023: Leeds United (assistant)
- 2024: Bayern Munich U19
- 2024–: Bayern Munich (assistant)

René Marić (born 4 September 1992) is an Austrian professional football manager. He currently works as an assistant manager for Bundesliga club Bayern Munich.

== Managerial career ==
=== Early career ===
Marić started his coaching career at his local side TSU Handenberg, at the age of 17. Alongside coaching, Marić studied Psychology at University. He also wrote for the website Spielverlagerung, which helped open up doors for consultancy and coaching roles within football.

=== Red Bull Salzburg ===
Marić struck up a friendship with Austrian Bundesliga club Red Bull Salzburg's under-18 coach, Marco Rose, and was subsequently appointed as his assistant in 2016. Marić was promoted to the assistant of the first team, in the summer of 2017, with Rose succeeding Oscar García as head coach of Red Bull Salzburg.

=== Borussia Mönchengladbach ===
In 2019, René Marić joined Bundesliga club Borussia Mönchengladbach, as assistant manager to Marco Rose.

=== Borussia Dortmund ===
At the end of the 2020–21 Bundesliga season, Marić left Mönchengladbach along with Rose and Alexander Zickler to join Bundesliga club Borussia Dortmund as assistant manager. However, at the end of the season, Dortmund decided to part company with Rose along with Marić, Zickler and Patrick Eibenberger.

=== Leeds United ===
On 30 July 2022, Marić was appointed as the assistant head coach, to Jesse Marsch, at Premier League club Leeds United. He departed Leeds United on 6 February 2023, following the sacking of Marsch.

=== Bayern Munich ===
On 15 November 2023, Marić was appointed by Bundesliga club Bayern Munich to a newly created position responsible for coaching development and playing philosophy. He was appointed as the head coach of the Bayern Munich U19 team on 5 February 2024, replacing Michael Hartmann.

In June 2024, he joined Vincent Kompany's coaching staff, having previously undertaken an educational visit with him at Burnley. He continued his work at the Bayern Campus, while his role with the U19 team was taken over by former U17 coach Peter Gaydarov.

== Personal life ==
Marić is of Croatian descent. He initially sought to play professional football but was forced to switch to coaching due to lack of playing opportunities. Marić, along with several other football enthusiasts, started an online blog called Spielverlagerung where he would rate and analyse performances of Bundesliga teams. An assistant of Thomas Tuchel's at Mainz 05, who had been following Marić's blog analysis of the team's performances, came in contact with Marić and invited him to Mainz for cooperation.

== Honours ==
=== Assistant manager ===
Red Bull Salzburg

- Austrian Bundesliga: 2017–18, 2018–19
- Austrian Cup: 2018–19

Red Bull Salzburg – Youth

- UEFA Youth League: 2016–17

Bayern Munich

- Bundesliga: 2024–25
