= Sven Mislintat =

German football scout (born 1972)

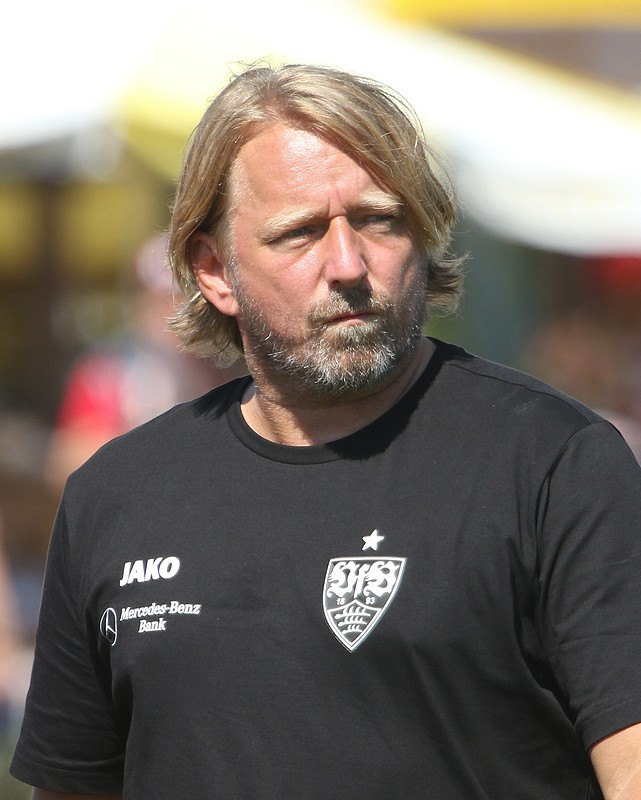
Mislintat with VfB Stuttgart in 2022

Sven Mislintat (born 5 November 1972) is a German football scout and sporting director. He is nicknamed "Diamantenauge" (Diamond Eye) for his ability in spotting players.

Mislintat worked for Borussia Dortmund as chief scout from 2006 to 2017, signing players such as Robert Lewandowski and Pierre-Emerick Aubameyang, and performed the same role at Arsenal from 2017 to 2019. From 2019 to 2022, he was sporting director at VfB Stuttgart, and director of football at Ajax in 2023. He returned to Dortmund as technical director from 2024 to 2025.

== Biography ==
Born in Kamen, North Rhine-Westphalia, Mislintat is a graduate of Ruhr University Bochum. He qualified as a football coach in 2011.

Mislintat went from being an analyst to being chief scout at Borussia Dortmund in the Bundesliga in 2006. The team, which had been saved from bankruptcy a year earlier, changed its recruitment from making big-money transfers to signing and developing young players. His signings included Polish striker Robert Lewandowski in 2010, Pierre-Emerick Aubameyang as his replacement in 2014, Japanese second division winger Shinji Kagawa, young French forward Ousmane Dembélé and Bayern Munich II defender Mats Hummels; all performed well at Dortmund and several were sold for significant profits. Dembélé joined from Rennes for €15 million in 2016 and was sold to Barcelona a year later for €105 million.

In November 2017, Mislintat left Borussia Dortmund for Arsenal. He said that he had been looking for an exit from the Westfalenstadion since January 2016, when he was banished from the club's training ground and inner circle by manager Thomas Tuchel, over an argument about signing Óliver Torres from Atlético Madrid. He remained at the Emirates Stadium until February 2019. He signed eight players, of which two were sold for small profits, resulting in a £103 million loss for the club. The largest loss was for Aubameyang, who followed him to Arsenal for £56 million and left for Barcelona for free. In 2021, he defended all his signings in an interview with The Athletic.

Mislintat returned to the Bundesliga as sporting director at VfB Stuttgart in April 2019. He left in November 2022. He was then linked to Liverpool, managed by his former Dortmund colleague Jürgen Klopp. The following April, he was hired at Ajax to fill the director of football position left vacant for over a year by Marc Overmars. On 24 September 2023, Mislintat was fired due to a lack of support within the club while he was being investigated whether he had a conflict of interest when he bought a player for Ajax through a broker in which he had 35% share.

Mislintat returned to Dortmund in April 2024 as technical director. He was sacked in February 2025 by sports director Lars Ricken. Fans protested against what they saw as clashes in the club's executive, also comprising sporting director Sebastian Kehl and advisor Matthias Sammer.
