= Frings =

Frings may refer to:

- Frings, a combo of french fries and onion rings at Harvey's fast food restaurants

== People ==
- Elmar Frings (1939–2002), German modern pentathlete
- Josef Frings (1887–1978), German Roman Catholic bishop
- Ketti Frings (1909–1981), US-American writer
- Manfred S. Frings (1925–2008), German academic
- Matthias Frings (born 1953), German writer and journalist
- Torsten Frings (born 1976), German footballer

== See also ==
- Fring (disambiguation)
