= Konstantin Fring =

German footballer

Personal information
- Date of birth: 9 January 1990 (age 36)
- Place of birth: Bad Kreuznach, Germany
- Position: Midfielder

Team information
- Current team: TSV Schott Mainz
- Number: 16

Youth career
- TuS 1878 Gensingen
- Hassia Bingen
- –2009: Mainz 05

Senior career*
Years	Team	Apps	(Gls)
2009–2011	Mainz 05 II	44	(2)
2011–2013	Borussia Dortmund II	33	(1)
2013–2015	Rot-Weiss Essen	19	(2)
2015–2017	Hassia Bingen		
2017–	TSV Schott Mainz	49	(7)
- * Club domestic league appearances and goals as of 1 August 2020

Konstantin Fring (born 9 January 1990) is a German footballer who plays as a midfielder for side TSV Schott Mainz.

With Rot-Weiss Essen Fring won the Lower Rhine Cup in 2015.
