= 2013–14 Real Madrid CF season =

110th season in existence of Real Madrid CF

Real Madrid
2013–14 season
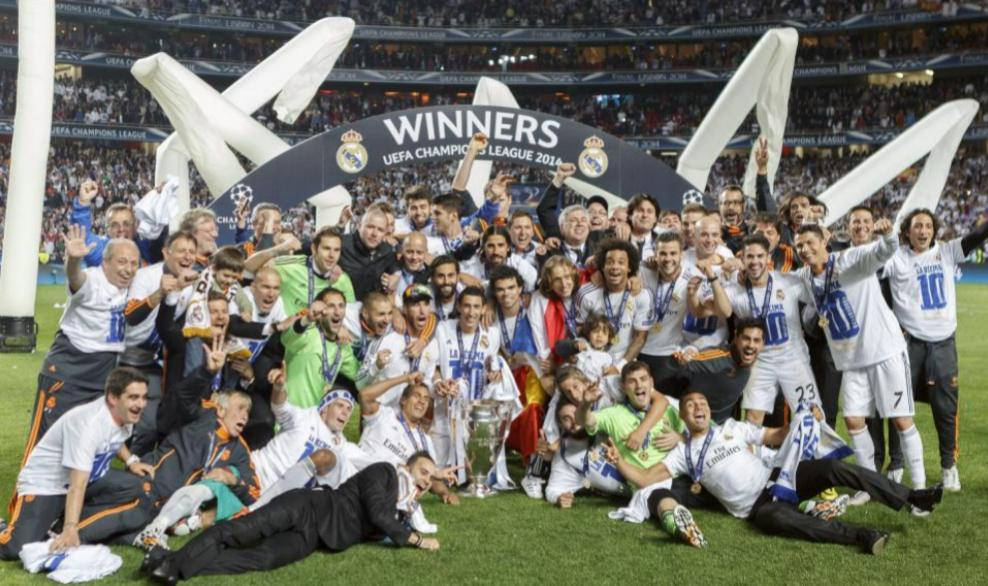
- Real Madrid players celebrating the club's 10th UEFA Champions League victory
- President: Florentino Pérez
- Head coach: Carlo Ancelotti
- Stadium: Santiago Bernabéu
- La Liga: 3rd
- Copa del Rey: Winners
- UEFA Champions League: Winners
- Top goalscorer: League: Cristiano Ronaldo (31); All: Cristiano Ronaldo (51)
- Highest home attendance: 85,454 (vs Barcelona, 23 March 2014)
- Lowest home attendance: 54,500 (vs Espanyol, 28 January 2014)
- Average home league attendance: 71,074
- Biggest win: Real Madrid 5–0 Rayo Vallecano; Real Betis 0–5 Real Madrid
- Biggest defeat: Dortmund 2–0 Real Madrid; Celta Vigo 2–0 Real Madrid
Home colours	Away colours	Third colours

The 2013–14 season was the 110th season in Real Madrid's history and their 83rd consecutive season in La Liga, the top division of Spanish football. It covered a period from 1 July 2013 to 30 June 2014, and ended with the club clinching a unique European cup double. This champions league win got Real Madrid their 10th champions league victory.

The team competed for a record 33rd La Liga title and entered the UEFA Champions League for the 17th successive season, competing for a record 10th title. They also entered the Copa del Rey in the round of 32. Real Madrid's shirt sponsor for this season was Emirates, having replaced Bwin.com. The club's major signing of the summer window was the long-awaited transfer of Gareth Bale from Tottenham Hotspur for €100 million.

In new manager Carlo Ancelotti's first season at the club, Real Madrid fought on all three fronts for the continental treble. Despite leading in the league standings on multiple occasions, Madrid ultimately finished in third place (level on points with Barcelona and three behind cross-city rivals Atlético Madrid), collecting 87 points in total and scoring a league-high 104 goals. By that time, Los Blancos had already secured the Copa del Rey – against rivals Barcelona – in April, with Bale scoring the winner. The major breakthrough came in the UEFA Champions League, where Real returned to the final after 12 years, having beaten defending champions Bayern Munich 5–0 on aggregate in the semi-finals. In the final, they defeated then-recently-league winners Atlético Madrid 4–1 a.e.t. to clinch their tenth European Cup (first since 2002) and become the first team to win ten European Cups/Champions League titles, an achievement known as "La Décima". Real's attacking trio of Bale, Benzema and Cristiano, dubbed the BBC, finished the season with 97 goals.

This season was the first since 2005–06 without Argentinian striker Gonzalo Higuaín, who left to join Napoli, and the first since 2009-10 without German midfielder Mesut Özil who departed for Arsenal.

== Season overview ==
=== Pre-season ===
Real Madrid started the summer without a manager, as José Mourinho departed to manage Chelsea. On 25 June, Carlo Ancelotti was officially announced as Real Madrid's new manager for the next three seasons. Later he went on to become the president of the club. He appeared for his first press conference in front of the media on 26 June.

On 3 June, Real Madrid announced its first signing of the season by exercising the buyback option for Dani Carvajal from Bayer Leverkusen for €6.5 million.

On 10 June, Real Madrid announced the signing of former youth system loanee Casemiro from São Paulo for €6 million.

On 27 June, Real Madrid announced its first major signing of the season with Isco from Málaga for €30 million.

On 10 July, Real Madrid agreed a contract extension with defender Nacho, keeping him in the club for four more years.

On 11 July, Real Madrid announced the sale of José Callejón to Napoli for €10 million.

On 12 July, Asier Illarramendi from Real Sociedad became the fourth signing for Real Madrid for €32.2 million, penning a six-year deal. He was the fifth player in the first team that won the 2013 UEFA European Under-21 Championship last June with Spain.

On 21 July, Real Madrid began its pre-season campaign against English Second Division side AFC Bournemouth. This was Carlo Ancelotti's first game in charge, with Madrid winning 6–0. Cristiano Ronaldo scored a brace and Sami Khedira, Gonzalo Higuaín, Casemiro and Ángel Di María chipped in the other goals. Real Madrid also announced the sale of Raúl Albiol to Napoli for €11 million.

On 24 July, Real Madrid played its second pre-season match against Lyon, coming from two goals down to draw 2–2 with goals from Casemiro and Álvaro Morata. Madrid also agreed on a contract extension with Jesé which would keep him with at the club for four additional years.

On 25 July, Real Madrid agreed a contract extension with Denis Cheryshev, keeping him with the club for four more years.

On 27 July, Real Madrid faced Paris Saint-Germain, Ancelotti's former club, winning 1–0, with Karim Benzema scoring the lone goal. Also, Real Madrid announced the sale of Gonzalo Higuaín to Napoli for €40 million.

On 1 August, Real Madrid played its first match in the International Champions Cup (ICC) against the LA Galaxy, recording a 3–1 victory with a goal from Ángel Di María and two from Karim Benzema.

On 3 August, Real Madrid faced Everton in the ICC semi-finals, beating them 2–1, with Cristiano Ronaldo and Mesut Özil scoring the goals.

On 7 August, Real Madrid faced Chelsea in the ICC final, led by former manager José Mourinho. Madrid recorded a 3–1 victory, with a brace by Cristiano Ronaldo and a goal from Marcelo capping a balanced team effort for Los Blancos.

On 10 August, Real Madrid played its final pre-season match against Italian squad Inter. Los Merengues got goals from Kaká and Ronaldo and also a Ricky Álvarez own goal in a 3–0 victory.

On 1 September, Madrid reached an agreement for the transfer of Gareth Bale from Tottenham Hotspur for a world record transfer fee of £85.3 million (€100 million).

Concluding the summer transfer window, Real Madrid had signed five players, as well as promoting three more from the youth system. Madrid had spent €165.5 million in the window and generated €108.5 million from sales, resulting in a net loss of €57 million.

=== August ===
Real Madrid officially kicked off its La Liga campaign on 18 August, playing home to Real Betis. Ancelotti fielded a 4–3–3 formation, while playing a style of attacking football, like that of José Mourinho's tactics. Real Madrid went on to win the match 2–1, with goals from Karim Benzema and debutante Isco, ensuring Ancelotti got off to a winning start.

Madrid's second match of the season – and final match of August – was a 0–1 away win at Granada, where a goal from Benzema ensured the victory for the club.

=== September ===
Madrid's third match of the campaign was a 3–1 home win against Athletic Bilbao, with a brace from Isco and a goal from Cristiano Ronaldo sealing the deal for Los Blancos.

Madrid was unable to progress up the table, recording a 2–2 away draw against Villarreal. Although there were goals from both of Madrid's world record signings, Gareth Bale and Cristiano Ronaldo, two goals from Cani and Giovani dos Santos held Real to a draw.

Madrid's third match of September was the club's opening Champions League away clash with Turkish side Galatasaray. The match turned out to be a goal fest, with Madrid producing six out of the seven goals scored. A hat-trick from Cristiano Ronaldo, two from Benzema and one from Isco ensured the Madrid side a 1–6 victory.

In Real's fourth match of September, their fourth match of the Liga campaign, Madrid recorded a 4–1 home win against Getafe, following a brace from Ronaldo, a goal from Pepe and a goal from Isco ensured the Madrid side the victory.

Los Blancos then travelled away to Elche, coming home with a 1–2 win with two goals from Ronaldo.

Madrid then faced rivals Atlético Madrid in El Derbi madrileño. A Diego Costa goal in the 11th minute was all that was needed for Atlético, securing a 0–1 win against their rivals.

=== October ===
Real Madrid opened October with their second Champions League clash, this time against Danish side Copenhagen at the Santiago Bernabéu. Braces from both Ronaldo and Di María produced the goals for Madrid, who won 4–0.

Madrid travelled to Levante, recording a 2–3 away win, with goals from Sergio Ramos, Álvaro Morata and Ronaldo, coming back from 2–1 down. Real Madrid then hosted Málaga in a 2–0 home win, with goals from Di María and Ronaldo.

Los Blancos then began their third Champions League group clash, this time against Italian side Juventus. Ronaldo opened the scoring, netting in the fourth minute, while Fernando Llorente equalized a mere ten minutes later for Juve, leveling the score at 1–1. A penalty was awarded to Madrid in the 29th minute, which was successfully converted by Ronaldo. The game ended at 2–1 to Madrid.

Real Madrid then travelled away to Barcelona to contest El Clásico. Goals from Neymar and Alexis Sánchez gave the Catalan side the lead, but a stoppage time goal from Jesé after a brilliant solo run by Ronaldo resulted in Barça only holding a one-goal deficit against Madrid.

Real Madrid then hosted Sevilla, a match which proved to be a ten-goal thriller. A hat-trick from Ronaldo, along with a brace from Bale and Benzema, ensured Los Blancos a deserved 7–3 win.

=== November ===
Real Madrid opened November with a tight 2–3 away win against Rayo Vallecano. Two goals from Ronaldo, along with one from Benzema, gave Los Blancos the win.

Madrid faced Juventus in another Champions League group match, this time away. The game ended 2–2, with goals from Ronaldo and Bale, while Arturo Vidal and Fernando Llorente scored for the Italian side.

Real then faced Real Sociedad at the Santiago Bernabéu, with Madrid almost finishing the match in the first half, putting away four goals. The goals before the break included a brace from Ronaldo, one from Benzema and one from Sami Khedira. Ronaldo completed the hat-trick in the second half, with the game ending 5–1 to Real.

Real faced Galatasary again in another Champions League group clash, this time at home, with Madrid winning 4–1. Sergio Ramos got dismissed near to the half-time break, but a consistent Madrid side held on with goals from Bale, Di María, Isco and Álvaro Arbeloa giving the Spanish giants the victory, along with ensuring the Madrid side a place in the knockout phase of the Champions League.

On the 27th, defensive midfielder Sami Khedira suffered a season-long injury playing in an international match for Germany against Italy. The injury was described as a "huge shock" from teammate Xabi Alonso.

November turned out to be a month in which Madrid went undefeated in all competitions, as Real closed November with a 4–0 home win against Real Valladolid, with a hat-trick from Bale and a goal from Benzema ensuring the Madrid side the win.

=== December ===
Real Madrid began December against Olímpic de Xàtiva in the Copa del Rey round of 32, with the game ending 0–0.

Madrid then faced Copenhagen away for their sixth Champions League group match, with the game ending 0–2 to Real. Goals from Luka Modrić and Ronaldo ensured Madrid the win. Ronaldo's goal set the new record for most goals scored in the Champions League group stages, with nine. The match was Madrid's final of the group stage, and they were the only team in their group to progress to the knockout round undefeated.

Los Blancos then faced Osasuna away on the 14th. Madrid were down 2–0 in the first 40 minutes and were reduced to ten men (Sergio Ramos was dismissed at the stroke of half time), but were able to come away with a draw as Isco and Pepe scored to salvage a point.

In a midweek clash, Real faced Olímpic de Xàtiva in the second leg of the Copa del Rey, this time winning 2–0 at home and progressing further in the competition. A goal from Asier Illarramendi along with a penalty from Di María gave Madrid the goals, and the side was able to progress into the round of 16.

Madrid then faced Valencia away in La Liga, with Real winning 2–3. Goals from Ronaldo, Di María and Jesé gave the Madrid side the three points to climb up the La Liga table, along with going through the final two months of 2013 undefeated.

=== January ===
Madrid officially kicked off 2014 in a La Liga home match against Celta de Vigo. Madrid had failed to score in the first half, but a Benzema goal in the 67th minute broke the deadlock. Real, however, were not finished, as two goals from Ronaldo, one in the 82nd and another in stoppage time of the second half, gave the Madrid side another three points.

Real's second match was against Osasuna in the Copa del Rey round of 16, with the first leg being played at the Santiago Bernabéu. A 17th-minute goal from Benzema, along with a 60th-minute strike from youth star Jesé gave the Madrid side a 2–0 aggregate advantage heading into the second leg.

Madrid's third game of January came in La Liga, with Real visiting Espanyol away. A goal from centre-back Pepe was all that was required for Madrid to collect three points in a 0–1 win.

Madrid then had to focus themselves on their second leg Copa del Rey round of 16 clash away at Osasuna. Madrid again won this game 0–2, with goals from Ronaldo and Di María, who scored in the 21st and 56th minutes respectively. This win meant Real had progressed into the quarter-finals of the Copa del Rey.

Real Madrid then faced Real Betis away, with the match ending in a resounding 0–5 victory to Los Blancos. Ronaldo scored a powerful long shot and assisted Morata with a bicycle kick, while the other goals were scored by Bale, Benzema, and Di María, helping collect another three points. This win propelled Madrid to joint top of La Liga.

Madrid faced Espanyol in the quarter-finals of the Copa del Rey, earning a 0–1 away result with a Benzema goal.

Real then faced 17th-placed Granada in a routine 2–0 home win. The goals came from Ronaldo and Benzema in the 56th and 74th minute respectively. The win propelled the Madrid side to the top of La Liga.

Madrid's final match of January came as a 1–0 home win against Espanyol in the quarter-finals of the Copa del Rey. Youth project Jesé scored early on, and Madrid were able to hang on tight until the end, winning 2–0 on aggregate and progressing to the semi-finals.

=== February ===
Madrid kicked off February with a disappointing 1–1 draw against fourth-placed Athletic Bilbao, with Jesé scoring the lone goal for Real. They finished on an even sourer note, as Ronaldo was sent off in the 75th minute.

Madrid were drawn to face fierce rivals Atlético Madrid in the semi-finals of the Copa del Rey. Real were without the suspended Ronaldo, but their star Portuguese forward was not required, as they won at home 3–0. Goals came from centre-back Pepe, winger Jesé and Argentinian forward Ángel Di María.

Real Madrid then faced Villarreal in La Liga, winning 4–2 at home. Goals from Bale, a brace from Benzema along with another strike from Jesé gave Madrid the win, but Mario and Giovani dos Santos goals for Villarreal denied Los Blancos a clean sheet. This was Ronaldo's final match suspended, meaning he would be available in the second leg of the Copa del Rey clash against Atlético.

Real's fourth match of February was their away leg clash against Atlético in the Copa del Rey. Returning star Ronaldo gave Real Madrid the win, with two converted penalties. These two goals meant Ronaldo had netted an impressive 34 goals in all competitions. Madrid's victory ensured they would face Barcelona in El Clásico for the Copa del Rey final at the Mestalla Stadium.

Real Madrid then faced Getafe in La Liga, away at the Coliseum Alfonso Pérez. Madrid comfortably cruised through the match, winning 0–3 with a goal from Jesé, who had scored in his last three La Liga matches, along with goals from Benzema and Modrić, and the win placed the Madrid side in second, on level points with Barcelona and Atlético Madrid.

The next match for Real Madrid proved to be vital, as winning would allow them to top La Liga, something the Spanish giants have not done for 15 months, but would only occur if Barcelona and Atlético Madrid lose. They faced Elche at home, winning 3–0 with a golazo from Gareth Bale, who struck from thirty yards out, along with goals from Illaramendi and Isco. Madrid's victory, along with Barcelona losing 3–1 to Real Sociedad and Atlético losing 3–0 to Osasuna, allowed them to top La Liga by three points.

Madrid's last match of February was the first leg of their last 16 Champions League clash against Schalke 04 away. The match turned out to be a seven-goal thriller for Madrid, as they won 1–6, effectively killing off the second leg and virtually guaranteeing Madrid a spot in the last eight of the competition. Braces were all scored by the returning Ronaldo, winger Bale and striker Benzema. However, a volley from Klaas-Jan Huntelaar in the 90th minute denied Madrid a clean sheet, along with ending captain and goalkeeper Iker Casillas' record of going over 900 minutes without conceding.

=== March ===
Real had a chance to extend their lead at the top of the table, should they win in El Derbi madrileño in La Liga against Atlético Madrid. Benzema scored early on to give Real the lead, before Koke equalised, slotting into the bottom left corner. Koke also assisted the second of Atlético's goal, which was scored by Gabi, who found the top left corner. Looking like a win for Real's bitter rivals, Cristiano Ronaldo scored and equalised and the game ended 2–2. Real gained a point and maintained the status quo at the top of La Liga, but now only carried a one-point lead over Barcelona.

Real's second match of March was also their second La Liga match of March, as the leaders took on Levante. Ronaldo jumped highest to powerfully head in Di María's left-wing corner and Marcelo doubled their lead shortly after the restart. Levante were reduced to ten men after David Navarro fought with an opponent. Real tripled their lead after Nikolaos Karabelas slid the ball in his own net. The win pushed Real three points clear at the top of La Liga, along with being four points above rivals Barcelona.

Madrid had a chance to propel their lead over Barcelona, who had dominated the league in the previous seasons, should they beat Málaga. Barça suffered a shock defeat at the hands of Real Valladolid, and should Real win, the Madrid side would be seven points clear at the top over their fierce rivals. A strike from Ronaldo gave Madrid an early advantage, but many shots went amiss and the game finished in a close 0–1 victory to the Madrid side.

Madrid subsequently hosted Schalke 04 for the second leg of their Champions League last 16 clash, with Madrid already boasting a 6–1 aggregate lead. A strike from Ronaldo just after the 20th minute gave Real the lead only for Tim Hoogland to equalize, and the teams went into half time at 1–1. Madrid continued to pile on the pressure and were ultimately rewarded after Ronaldo found the net again in the 74th minute. Morata scored another to end the game at 3–1. Winning at a combined score of 9–2 on both legs, Madrid progressed to the next round of the tournament.

Madrid then hosted fierce rivals Barcelona, who were beginning to hit form and pile on the pressure to Los Blancos. In what could be called as one of the most entertaining Clásicos of all time, a seven-goal thriller was played. Andrés Iniesta gave Barça the lead in the seventh minute, before two strikes from Karim Benzema in quick succession reversed the fortunes. Lionel Messi scored an equaliser, but Ronaldo gave Madrid the advantage netting home a penalty. Messi equalised again after a challenge from Madrid's defender Sergio Ramos resulted in a penalty and Ramos being sent off in the 63rd minute, along with converting another penalty, which completed the hat-trick for the Argentinian, along with him breaking the record for the number of goals scored in El Clásico. The game was also notorious for dodgy officiating and missed chances, and it was named one of the most controversial matches ever.

Madrid then travelled to Sevilla, hoping to move up the La Liga table and keep pressure on their title rivals. Madrid found the net early, thanks to Ronaldo, before Carlos Bacca netted in just under 20 minutes. Bacca scored again in the 72nd minute, giving Sevilla the win and putting a dent in Madrid's title challenge.

Madrid's final match of March was at home to Rayo Vallecano, a game which Madrid dominated, scoring five in the process. Ronaldo netted early, before right-back Dani Carvajal scored in the second half, after which Bale added a brace, along with a strike from Morata, giving Madrid the three points and reclaiming back the winning momentum after suffering back-to-back defeats.

=== April ===
Real Madrid began April by hosting Borussia Dortmund in the first leg of the Champions League quarter-finals at the Santiago Bernabéu, three days after the thrashing of Vallecano. Having decimated Schalke 04 in the round of 16, Madrid hosted last year's Champions League finalists. Furthermore, Dortmund had defeated Real 4–3 on aggregate in last season's semi-finals, and Los Blancos were eager to get their revenge. Bale opened the scoring in the third minute, before Isco added another, with Madrid leading 2–0 at half time. Ronaldo added another before Madrid played calm to win comprehensively. The 3–0 Madrid victory required Dortmund to score four goals in the next round to progress further in the competition.

Madrid's second match of April was against Real Sociedad. Goals from Illarramendi, Bale, Pepe and Morata helped Real to a calm 4–0 victory.

Madrid travelled away to Dortmund for the second leg of the Champions League quarter-finals, and lost 2–0 after an impressive solo performance from Marco Reus. His efforts fell to fruition, however, as Madrid progressed into the semi-finals of the competition, where they would face last year's winners in Bayern Munich.

Madrid's fourth match of April was against Almería, and the match was the second in a row where Madrid scored four goals, as another 4–0 win kept them in the race for the title, thanks to goals from Di María, Bale, Isco and Morata.

Madrid's fifth match of April was against fierce rivals Barcelona in the final of the Copa del Rey. Superstar Ronaldo was injured and unavailable for the game, but Madrid boasted a proud record, as they were the only side in the competition not to concede, and found the net early thanks to Di María. Heading into the late stages of the match, Marc Bartra scored for Barça, levelling the scores. As it looked like the match would be contested in extra time, a brilliant solo goal from Bale late on ensured Madrid the trophy, lifting their 19th Copa del Rey title.

The next fixture was a crucial one for Los Blancos as they faced the defending champions of the European Cup and perennial rivals Bayern Munich in the Champions League semi-finals. Real won thanks to a Benzema goal in a tightly contested game.

In between two crucial battles against Bayern, Madrid easily dispatched of Osasuna 4–0 in the league thanks to a brace from Ronaldo, which consisted of two marvelous long shots, plus goals by Ramos and Carvajal. This was Real's third consecutive league victory with at least four goals scored and none conceded.

Los Blancos capped their successful month by progressing to the Champions League final for the first time in 12 years after defeating the defending champions. The Whites dominated the game, winning the semi-final matchup 5–0 on aggregate. Victory over Bayern meant that Madrid had defeated both finalists of the previous Champions League season en route to the final.

=== May ===
In terms of league performance, May was somewhat a disappointment for Real as the team won only one out of four games and failed to clinch the title, finishing three points behind rivals Atlético Madrid and level on points with Barcelona but below on head-to-head tiebreaking criteria. As a result, Los Blancos finished the season third, but in title contention throughout the season. Besides, Madrid scored the most goals (104) out of all teams in their league campaign and was second only to Barça on goal differential (+66 to +67).

The league fixtures of the month were a 2–2 home tie with Valencia (with a 90+2 backheel equalizer from Ronaldo), a 1–1 away tie with Valladolid (with the home team equalizing late in the match), a 0–2 away defeat to Celta (that ruined Real's hopes for the title), and a 3–1 win over Espanyol on the last matchday.

Winning a long-awaited La Décima would be much more than a perfect consolation for Los Blancos and they ultimately brought a record-extending tenth European Cup title from Lisbon, although their path was anything but easy. Diego Godín opened the scoring for Atlético in the first half and the Madrid team was on the run to accomplishing their first continental double in history up to the injury time of the second half when Sergio Ramos scored an all-important head ball equalizer after a corner kick. In the extra time, it was Real, Real, and only Real as Los Blancos obliterated the distraught rivals by scoring three unanswered goals in its second half (courtesy of Bale, Marcelo, and Ronaldo) and triumphed in the competition. Overall, Ronaldo scored 51 goals (31 in La Liga, a record 17 in the Champions League, and three in the Copa del Rey) to become the team's top scorer for the fifth consecutive season. The Portuguese would go even further in the next season, scoring 61 goals in all competitions and breaking his own record from 2011–12.

== Kits ==
Supplier: Adidas / Sponsor: Fly Emirates

Home	Away	Third	Goalkeeper 1	Goalkeeper 2	Goalkeeper 3

== Players ==
=== Squad information ===
N	Pos.	Nat.	Name	Age	EU	Since	App	Goals	Ends	Transfer fee	Notes
1	GK	(Spain)	Iker Casillas (captain)	33	EU	1999	678	0	2017	Youth system	
2	CB	(France)	Raphaël Varane	21	EU	2011	71	4	2017	€10M	
3	CB	(Portugal)	Pepe (vice-captain)	31	EU	2007	248	10	2016	€30M	Second nationality: Brazil
4	CB	(Spain)	Sergio Ramos (vice-captain)	28	EU	2005	403	48	2017	€28M	
5	LB	(Portugal)	Fábio Coentrão	26	EU	2011	83	1	2017	€30M	
6	DM	(Germany)	Sami Khedira	27	EU	2010	144	9	2015	€12M	Second nationality: Tunisia
7	LW	(Portugal)	Cristiano Ronaldo	29	EU	2009	246	252	2018	€94M	
9	ST	(France)	Karim Benzema	26	EU	2009	235	111	2015	€35M	Second nationality: Algeria
11	RW	(Wales)	Gareth Bale	24	EU	2013	44	22	2019	€91M	
12	LB	(Brazil)	Marcelo (vice-captain)	26	EU	2007 (Winter)	267	19	2018	€6.5M	Second nationality: Spain
13	GK	(Spain)	Jesús	26	EU	2012	2	0	2014	Youth system	
14	CM	(Spain)	Xabi Alonso	32	EU	2009	234	6	2014	€30M	
15	RB	(Spain)	Dani Carvajal	22	EU	2013	45	2	2019	€6.5M	Originally from youth system
16	CM	(Brazil)	Casemiro	22	Non-EU	2013	27	0	2017	€6M	
17	RB	(Spain)	Álvaro Arbeloa	31	EU	2009	193	4	2016	€4.5M	Originally from youth system
18	CB	(Spain)	Nacho Fernandez	24	EU	2012	35	0	2017	Youth system	
19	CM	(Croatia)	Luka Modrić	28	EU	2012	104	6	2017	€30M	
20	LW	(Spain)	Jesé	21	EU	2011	33	8	2017	Youth system	
21	ST	(Spain)	Álvaro Morata	21	EU	2012	52	11	2015	Youth system	
22	RW	(Argentina)	Ángel Di María	26	Non-EU	2010	189	36	2018	€25M	
23	AM	(Spain)	Isco	22	EU	2013	53	11	2018	€30M	
24	CM	(Spain)	Asier Illarramendi	24	EU	2013	49	3	2019	€32.2M	
25	GK	(Spain)	Diego López	32	EU	2013 (Winter)	73	0	2017	€4M	Originally from youth system

- Last updated: 6 January 2014
- Source: realmadrid.com, Wikipedia players' articles (for players' numbers, appearances, and goals)
- Ordered by squad number.

=== In ===
No.	Pos.	Nat.	Name	Age	EU	Moving from	Type	Transfer window	Ends	Transfer fee	Source
15	RB	(Spain)	Dani Carvajal	21	EU	(Germany) Bayer Leverkusen	Transfer	Summer	2019	€6.5M	Real Madrid C.F.
16	CM	(Brazil)	Casemiro	21	Non-EU	(Brazil) São Paulo	Transfer	Summer	2017	€6M	Real Madrid C.F.
23	AM	(Spain)	Isco	21	EU	(Spain) Málaga	Transfer	Summer	2018	€30M	Real Madrid C.F.
24	CM	(Spain)	Asier Illarramendi	23	EU	(Spain) Real Sociedad	Transfer	Summer	2019	€32.2M	Real Madrid C.F.
20	LW	(Spain)	Jesé	20	EU	Youth system	Promoted	Summer	2017	N/A	Real Madrid C.F.
	LW	(Russia)	Denis Cheryshev	22	EU	Youth system	Promoted	Summer	2017	N/A	Real Madrid C.F.
11	RW	(Wales)	Gareth Bale	24	EU	(England) Tottenham Hotspur	Transfer	Summer	2019	€100M	Real Madrid C.F.

Total expenditure: €174.7 million

=== Out ===
No.	Pos.	Nat.	Name	Age	EU	Moving to	Type	Transfer window	Transfer fee	Source
11	CB	(Portugal)	Ricardo Carvalho	35	EU	(France) Monaco	Transfer	Summer	Free	AS Monaco FC
	RW	(Spain)	Pedro León	26	EU	(Spain) Getafe	Transfer	Summer	€6M	AS
15	DM	(Ghana)	Michael Essien	30	EU	(England) Chelsea	Loan return	Summer	N/A	Chelsea F.C.
21	RW	(Spain)	José Callejón	26	EU	(Italy) Napoli	Transfer	Summer	€10M	S.S.C. Napoli
18	CB	(Spain)	Raúl Albiol	27	EU	(Italy) Napoli	Transfer	Summer	€12M	S.S.C. Napoli
20	ST	(Argentina)	Gonzalo Higuaín	25	EU	(Italy) Napoli	Transfer	Summer	€40M	S.C.C Napoli
8	AM	(Brazil)	Kaká	31	EU	(Italy) Milan	Transfer	Summer	Free	A.C. Milan
	LW	(Russia)	Denis Cheryshev	22	EU	(Spain) Sevilla	Loan	Summer	N/A	Sevilla FC
13	GK	(Spain)	Antonio Adán	26	EU	(Italy) Cagliari	Contract termination	Summer	N/A	Real Madrid C.F.
10	AM	(Germany)	Mesut Özil	24	EU	(England) Arsenal	Transfer	Summer	€50M	Arsenal F.C.

Total revenue: €122.4M Net income: ▼€52.3 million

== Pre-season and friendlies ==
Win Draw Loss

21 July 2013 Friendly	Bournemouth	0–6	Real Madrid	Bournemouth, England
20:45 WEST (UTC+01:00)		Report	Ronaldo 22', 41'; Khedira 43'; Higuaín 47'; Di María 68'; Casemiro 83'	Stadium: Goldsands Stadium; Attendance: 11,772; Referee: Lee Probert (England)

24 July 2013 Friendly	Lyon	2–2	Real Madrid	Lyon, France
21:00 CEST (UTC+02:00)	Grenier 20'; Lacazette (yellow card) 51'; López 62'	Report	Casemiro (yellow card) 51', (goal) 84'; Khedira (yellow card) 68'; Morata 78' (pen.)	Stadium: Stade de Gerland; Attendance: 39,342; Referee: Tony Chapron (France)

27 July 2013 Super Matchen	Paris Saint-Germain	0–1	Real Madrid	Gothenburg, Sweden
20:00 CEST (UTC+02:00)	Matuidi (yellow card) 24'; Verratti (yellow card) 79'	Report	Benzema 23'; Modrić (yellow card) 37'	Stadium: Ullevi; Attendance: 44,262; Referee: Michael Lerjéus (Sweden)

1 August 2013 ICC	LA Galaxy	1–3	Real Madrid	Glendale, Arizona, United States
19:30 MST (UTC−07:00)	Villarreal 63'	Report	Di María 15'; Benzema 51', 74'; Morata (yellow card) 81'	Stadium: University of Phoenix Stadium; Attendance: 38,922; Referee: Juan Guzman (United States); Man of the Match: Benzema

3 August 2013 ICC	Everton	1–2	Real Madrid	Los Angeles, California, United States
17:00 PDT (UTC−07:00)	Jelavić 61'	Report	Ronaldo 17'; Özil 31'	Stadium: Dodger Stadium; Attendance: 40,681; Referee: Matthew Foerster (United States); Man of the Match: Özil

7 August 2013 ICC	Chelsea	1–3	Real Madrid	Miami Gardens, Florida, United States
21:00 EDT (UTC−04:00)	Ramires 16'; Lampard (yellow card) 37'; Cahill (yellow card) 59'	Report	Marcelo 14'; Ronaldo 31', 57'; Arbeloa (yellow card) 43'	Stadium: Sun Life Stadium; Attendance: 67,273; Referee: Edvin Jurisevic (United States); Man of the Match: Ronaldo

10 August 2013 Friendly	Inter Milan	0–3	Real Madrid	St. Louis, Missouri, United States
13:00 CDT (UTC−05:00)	Álvarez (yellow card) 83'	Report	Kaká 11', (yellow card) 51'; Ronaldo 38'; Álvarez 67' (o.g.)	Stadium: Edward Jones Dome; Attendance: 54,184; Referee: Ismail Elfath (United States); Man of the Match: Casemiro

22 August 2013 Bernabéu Trophy	Real Madrid	5–0	Al Sadd	Madrid, Spain
22:30 CEST (UTC+02:00)	Raúl 23'; Isco 59'; Benzema 79' (pen.); Jesé 82', 88'	Report		Stadium: Estadio Santiago Bernabéu; Attendance: 85,500; Referee: Carlos Velasco Carballo (Spain)
Note: Raúl played the first half for Real Madrid and the second half for Al Sadd. Cristiano Ronaldo wore No. 11 for this match.

29 August 2013 Teresa Herrera Trophy	Deportivo La Coruña	0–4	Real Madrid	A Coruña, Spain
19:00 CEST (UTC+02:00)	Borja (yellow card) 40'	Report	Kaká 6', 85'; Morata 12'; Casemiro 16'; Nacho (yellow card) 81'	Stadium: Estadio Riazor; Attendance: 26,000; Referee: David Pérez Pallas (Spain)

2 January 2014 Friendly	Paris Saint-Germain	0–1	Real Madrid	Doha, Qatar
17:45 AST (UTC+03:00)		Report	Jesé 18'	Stadium: Khalifa International Stadium; Attendance: 39,710; Referee: Abdulrahman Al-Jassim (Qatar); Man of the Match: Jesé, López

Last updated: 2 January 2014
Sources: Bournemouth, PSG, International Champions Cup, Bernabéu Trophy, Teresa Herrera Trophy, PSG

== Competitions ==
=== La Liga ===
==== League table ====
Pos	Team	Pld	W	D	L	GF	GA	GD	Pts	Qualification or relegation
1	Atlético Madrid (C)	38	28	6	4	77	26	+51	90	Qualification for the Champions League group stage
2	Barcelona	38	27	6	5	100	33	+67	87 (Note: Barcelona finished ahead of Real Madrid on head-to-head points: Barcelona 2–1 Real Madrid, Real Madrid 3–4 Barcelona.)	Qualification for the Champions League group stage
3	Real Madrid	38	27	6	5	104	38	+66	87	Qualification for the Champions League group stage
4	Athletic Bilbao	38	20	10	8	66	39	+27	70	Qualification for the Champions League play-off round
5	Sevilla	38	18	9	11	69	52	+17	63	Qualification for the Europa League group stage (Note: Sevilla automatically qualified for the 2014–15 UEFA Europa League group stage as the defending champions; the berth through their league position was vacated.)

Source: La Liga, ESPN
Rules for classification: 1st points; 2nd head-to-head points;
(C) Champions

==== Results by round ====
Round	1	2	3	4	5	6	7	8	9	10	11	12	13	14	15	16	17	18	19	20	21	22	23	24	25	26	27	28	29	30	31	32	33	34	35	36	37	38
Ground	H	A	H	A	H	A	H	A	H	A	H	A	H	A	H	A	A	H	A	A	H	A	H	A	H	A	H	A	H	A	H	A	H	H	H	A	A	H
Result	W	W	W	D	W	W	L	W	W	L	W	W	W	W	W	D	W	W	W	W	W	D	W	W	W	D	W	W	L	L	W	W	W	W	D	D	L	W
Position	7	5	4	4	3	3	3	3	3	3	3	3	3	3	3	3	3	3	3	3	3	3	2	2	1	1	1	1	2	3	3	3	2	3	3	3	3	3

Updated to match(es) played on 17 May 2014. Source: Competitive matches
A = Away; H = Home; W = Win; D = Draw; L = Loss

==== Matches ====
Win Draw Loss

18 August 2013 1	Real Madrid	2–1	Real Betis	Madrid
21:00 CEST (UTC+02:00)	Benzema 26'; Modrić (yellow card) 50'; Isco 86'	Report	Molina 14'; Matilla (yellow card) 30'; Nosa (yellow card) 90+2'	Stadium: Santiago Bernabéu; Attendance: 76,870; Referee: Jesús Gil Manzano (Extremadura); Man of the Match: Isco, Marcelo

26 August 2013 2	Granada	0–1	Real Madrid	Granada
21:00 CEST (UTC+02:00)	Piti (yellow card) 55'; Iturra (yellow card) 79'; Brahimi (yellow card) 86'; Mainz (yellow card) 86'	Report	Benzema 10'; Pepe (yellow card) 36'; Marcelo (yellow card) 38'	Stadium: Los Cármenes; Attendance: 16,626; Referee: Javier Estrada Fernández (Catalonia); Man of the Match: Benzema, Isco

1 September 2013 3	Real Madrid	3–1	Athletic Bilbao	Madrid
12:00 CEST (UTC+02:00)	Isco 26', 72'; Khedira (yellow card) 29'; Ronaldo 45+1'	Report	Gurpegui (yellow card) 21'; Beñat (yellow card) 67'; Ibai 79'	Stadium: Santiago Bernabéu; Attendance: 72,231; Referee: Carlos Clos Gómez (Aragon); Man of the Match: Modrić, Isco

14 September 2013 4	Villarreal	2–2	Real Madrid	Villarreal
22:00 CEST (UTC+02:00)	Cani 21'; Aquino (yellow card) 34'; Dos Santos 70'; Pina (yellow card) 78'	Report	Nacho (yellow card) 37'; Bale 39'; Ramos (yellow card) 57'; Ronaldo 64'; Morata (yellow card) 77'	Stadium: El Madrigal; Attendance: 23,852; Referee: Fernando Teixeira Vitienes (Cantabria)

22 September 2013 5	Real Madrid	4–1	Getafe	Madrid
19:00 CEST (UTC+02:00)	Pepe 19'; Ronaldo 33' (pen.), 90+3'; Carvajal (yellow card) 42'; Isco 59'	Report	Lafita 5'; Alexis (yellow card) 31'; Míchel (yellow card) 32' (red card) 85'; Pedro León (yellow card) 77'	Stadium: Santiago Bernabéu; Attendance: 70,063; Referee: David Fernández Borbalán (Andalusia); Man of the Match: Cristiano Ronaldo

25 September 2013 6	Elche	1–2	Real Madrid	Elche
22:00 CEST (UTC+02:00)	Manu (yellow card) 7'; Botía (yellow card) 34'; Suárez (yellow card) 58'; Coro (yellow card) 60'; Fidel (yellow card) 87'; Boakye 90+1'; Herrera (yellow card) 90+4'; Pérez (yellow card) 90+5'; Sánchez (yellow card) 90+8'	Report	Ramos (yellow card) 9'; Ronaldo 51', 90+6' (pen.), (yellow card) 76'	Stadium: Manuel Martínez Valero; Attendance: 28,754; Referee: César Muñiz Fernández (Asturias); Man of the Match: Ronaldo, López
Note: Carlos Sánchez was booked after the final whistle.

28 September 2013 7	Real Madrid	0–1	Atlético Madrid	Madrid
22:00 CEST (UTC+02:00)	Coentrão (yellow card) 40'; Ramos (yellow card) 67'; Arbeloa (yellow card) 77'; Pepe (yellow card) 80'	Report	Costa 11', (yellow card) 49'; Turan (yellow card) 38'; Koke (yellow card) 43'; Filipe Luís (yellow card) 61'	Stadium: Santiago Bernabéu; Attendance: 79,845; Referee: Antonio Mateu Lahoz (Valencian Community)

5 October 2013 8	Levante	2–3	Real Madrid	Valencia
20:00 CEST (UTC+02:00)	Diawara 57'; López (yellow card) 80'; El Zhar 86'	Report	Khedira (yellow card) 43'; Arbeloa (yellow card) 50'; Ramos 61'; Morata 90'; Ronaldo 90+4', (yellow card) 90+4'	Stadium: Ciutat de València; Attendance: 24,102; Referee: José Luis González González (Castile and León); Man of the Match: Ronaldo, Morata

19 October 2013 9	Real Madrid	2–0	Málaga	Madrid
16:00 CEST (UTC+02:00)	Di María 46'; Ronaldo 90+1' (pen.)	Report	Antunes (yellow card) 11'; Eliseu (yellow card) 49'; Sánchez (yellow card) 79'; Weligton (yellow card) 82'	Stadium: Santiago Bernabéu; Attendance: 78,362; Referee: Miguel Ángel Ayza Gámez (Valencian Community); Man of the Match: Di María

26 October 2013 10	Barcelona	2–1	Real Madrid	Barcelona
18:00 CEST (UTC+02:00)	Busquets (yellow card) 7'; Neymar 19'; Adriano (yellow card) 35'; Sánchez 79'	Report	Ramos (yellow card) 14'; Bale (yellow card) 45'; Khedira (yellow card) 59'; Marcelo (yellow card) 64'; Ronaldo (yellow card) 80'; Jesé 90+1'	Stadium: Camp Nou; Attendance: 98,761; Referee: Alberto Undiano Mallenco (Navarre)

30 October 2013 11	Real Madrid	7–3	Sevilla	Madrid
22:00 CET (UTC+01:00)	Bale 13', 27'; Ronaldo 32' (pen.), 60', 71'; Ramos (yellow card) 37'; Benzema 53', 80'; Arbeloa (yellow card) 65'; Khedira (yellow card) 66'	Report	Moreno (yellow card) 25'; Rakitić 38' (pen.), 63'; Bacca 40'; Mbia (yellow card) 59' (yellow-red card) 76'; Perotti (yellow card) 90+3'	Stadium: Santiago Bernabéu; Attendance: 66,836; Referee: José Antonio Teixeira Vitienes (Cantabria); Man of the Match: Ronaldo, Bale

2 November 2013 12	Rayo Vallecano	2–3	Real Madrid	Madrid
20:00 CET (UTC+01:00)	Viera 53' (pen.), 55' (pen.); Nacho (yellow card) 59'; Tito (yellow card) 77'; Trashorras (yellow card) 88'	Report	Ronaldo 3', 48'; Carvajal (yellow card) 6'; Alonso (yellow card) 11'; Benzema 31'; Di María (yellow card) 62'; Marcelo (yellow card) 71'; Modrić (yellow card) 90+3'	Stadium: Vallecas; Attendance: 13,900; Referee: Alfonso Javier Álvarez Izquierdo (Catalonia); Man of the Match: Ronaldo, Bale

9 November 2013 13	Real Madrid	5–1	Real Sociedad	Madrid
16:00 CET (UTC+01:00)	Ronaldo 12', 26' (pen.), 76'; Benzema 18'; Pepe (yellow card) 29'; Khedira 36'; Arbeloa (yellow card) 53'	Report	Griezmann 61'; González (yellow card) 76'	Stadium: Santiago Bernabéu; Attendance: 77,427; Referee: Juan Martínez Munuera (Valencian Community); Man of the Match: Ronaldo, Benzema

23 November 2013 14	Almería	0–5	Real Madrid	Almería
20:00 CET (UTC+01:00)	Esteban (yellow card) 74'	Report	Ronaldo 3'; Arbeloa (yellow card) 56'; Benzema 61'; Ramos (yellow card) 68'; Bale 72'; Isco 75'; Morata 81'	Stadium: Mediterráneo; Attendance: 13,605; Referee: Jesús Gil Manzano (Extremadura); Man of the Match: Ronaldo, Isco

30 November 2013 15	Real Madrid	4–0	Real Valladolid	Madrid
20:00 CET (UTC+01:00)	Bale 33', 64', 89'; Benzema 36'; Pepe (yellow card) 71'	Report	Sastre (yellow card) 81'	Stadium: Santiago Bernabéu; Attendance: 68,655; Referee: Pedro Jesús Pérez Montero (Andalusia); Man of the Match: Bale, Di María

14 December 2013 16	Osasuna	2–2	Real Madrid	Pamplona
16:00 CET (UTC+01:00)	Arribas (yellow card) 11'; Riera 16', 39'; Cejudo (yellow card) 26'; Damià (yellow card) 35'; Torres (yellow card) 45'; Silva (yellow card) 75' (yellow-red card) 79'	Report	Pepe (yellow card) 20', (goal) 80'; Ramos (yellow card) 31' (yellow-red card) 44'; Isco 45'	Stadium: El Sadar; Attendance: 15,978; Referee: Carlos Clos Gómez (Aragon)
Note: The first yellow card given to Sergio Ramos was later rescinded by RFEF's competition committee.

22 December 2013 17	Valencia	2–3	Real Madrid	Valencia
21:00 CET (UTC+01:00)	Piatti 34', (yellow card) 55'; Mathieu (yellow card) 58', (goal) 62'	Report	Di María 28'; Ronaldo 40'; Nacho (yellow card) 41'; Arbeloa (yellow card) 64'; Jesé 82'	Stadium: Mestalla; Attendance: 40,000; Referee: Fernando Teixeira Vitienes (Cantabria); Man of the Match: Di María, Modrić

6 January 2014 18	Real Madrid	3–0	Celta Vigo	Madrid
19:00 CET (UTC+01:00)	Benzema 67'; Ronaldo 82', 90+3'	Report	López (yellow card) 34'; Fernández (yellow card) 43'	Stadium: Santiago Bernabéu; Attendance: 65,217; Referee: Alfonso Javier Álvarez Izquierdo (Catalonia); Man of the Match: Ronaldo, Jesé

12 January 2014 19	Espanyol	0–1	Real Madrid	Cornellà de Llobregat
19:00 CET (UTC+01:00)	Torje (yellow card) 58'; Córdoba (yellow card) 83'	Report	Modrić (yellow card) 13'; Pepe 55'	Stadium: Cornellà-El Prat; Attendance: 32,131; Referee: José Antonio Teixeira Vitienes (Cantabria)

18 January 2014 20	Real Betis	0–5	Real Madrid	Seville
16:00 CET (UTC+01:00)	Sevilla (yellow card) 27'; Vadillo (yellow card) 74'; Chica (yellow card) 77'	Report	Ronaldo 10'; Ramos (yellow card) 19'; Bale 25'; Benzema 45+1'; Di María 62'; Morata 90'	Stadium: Benito Villamarín; Attendance: 48,500; Referee: Iglesias Villanueva (Galicia)

25 January 2014 21	Real Madrid	2–0	Granada	Madrid
16:00 CET (UTC+01:00)	Ramos (yellow card) 17'; Benzema (yellow card) 19', (goal) 74'; Ronaldo 56'; Modrić (yellow card) 60'; Di María (yellow card) 65'	Report	Murillo (yellow card) 9'; Iturra (yellow card) 62'	Stadium: Santiago Bernabéu; Attendance: 75,800; Referee: Jesús Gil Manzano (Extremadura)

2 February 2014 22	Athletic Bilbao	1–1	Real Madrid	Bilbao
21:00 CET (UTC+01:00)	Ibai 73'; Iturraspe (yellow card) 75'	Report	Alonso (yellow card) 30'; Jesé 65'; Ronaldo (red card) 75'	Stadium: San Mamés; Attendance: 47,000; Referee: Miguel Ángel Ayza Gámez (Valencian Community)

8 February 2014 23	Real Madrid	4–2	Villarreal	Madrid
20:00 CET (UTC+01:00)	Bale 7'; Benzema 25', 76'; Jesé 64'	Report	Mario 43', (yellow card) 59'; Costa (yellow card) 54'; Dos Santos 69'	Stadium: Santiago Bernabéu; Attendance: 75,624; Referee: José Luis González González (Castile and León)

16 February 2014 24	Getafe	0–3	Real Madrid	Getafe
17:00 CET (UTC+01:00)	Rodríguez (yellow card) 38'; Alexis (yellow card) 51'; Valera (yellow card) 68'	Report	Jesé 5'; Bale (yellow card) 26'; Benzema 27', (yellow card) 51'; Modrić 66' (yellow card) 75'; Di María (yellow card) 77'	Stadium: Coliseum Alfonso Pérez; Attendance: 11,000; Referee: Pedro Jesús Pérez Montero (Andalusia)

22 February 2014 25	Real Madrid	3–0	Elche	Madrid
16:00 CET (UTC+01:00)	Illarramendi 34'; Pepe (yellow card) 51'; Bale 72'; Isco 81'	Report	Rivera (yellow card) 40'; Botía (yellow card) 63'; Márquez (yellow card) 70'	Stadium: Santiago Bernabéu; Attendance: 68,500; Referee: Eduardo Prieto Iglesias (Navarre)

2 March 2014 26	Atlético Madrid	2–2	Real Madrid	Madrid
17:00 CET (UTC+01:00)	Turan (yellow card) 11'; Koke 28'; Godín (yellow card) 39'; Gabi 45+1'; Costa (yellow card) 64'	Report	Benzema 3'; Pepe (yellow card) 39'; Arbeloa (yellow card) 67'; Ronaldo 82'	Stadium: Vicente Calderón; Attendance: 54,600; Referee: Carlos Delgado Ferreiro (Basque Country)

9 March 2014 27	Real Madrid	3–0	Levante	Madrid
19:00 CET (UTC+01:00)	Ronaldo 11'; Marcelo 49'; Ramos (yellow card) 54'; Di María (yellow card) 58'; Karabelas 81' (o.g.)	Report	Vyntra (yellow card) 58'; Pallardó (yellow card) 62'; Navarro (red card) 64'	Stadium: Santiago Bernabéu; Attendance: 74,172; Referee: Ignacio Iglesias Villanueva (Galicia)

15 March 2014 28	Málaga	0–1	Real Madrid	Málaga
20:00 CET (UTC+01:00)	Antunes (yellow card) 19'; Duda (yellow card) 61'	Report	Ronaldo 23'	Stadium: La Rosaleda; Attendance: 29,265; Referee: Juan Martínez Munuera (Valencian Community)

23 March 2014 29	Real Madrid	3–4	Barcelona	Madrid
21:00 CET (UTC+01:00)	Benzema 20', 24'; Di María (yellow card) 35'; Pepe (yellow card) 43'; Ronaldo 55' (pen.), (yellow card) 85'; Ramos (red card) 63'; Alonso (yellow card) 85'; Modrić (yellow card) 88'	Report	Iniesta 7'; Messi 42', 65' (pen.), 84' (pen.); Fàbregas (yellow card) 43'; Busquets (yellow card) 66'	Stadium: Santiago Bernabéu; Attendance: 85,454; Referee: Alberto Undiano Mallenco (Navarre)

26 March 2014 30	Sevilla	2–1	Real Madrid	Seville
22:00 CET (UTC+01:00)	Bacca 19', 72'; Iborra (yellow card) 21'; Marin (yellow card) 61'	Report	Ronaldo 14'; Bale (yellow card) 23'; Varane (yellow card) 78'; Alonso (yellow card) 87'	Stadium: Ramón Sánchez Pizjuán; Attendance: 38,100; Referee: José Luis González González (Castile and León)

29 March 2014 31	Real Madrid	5–0	Rayo Vallecano	Madrid
22:00 CEST (UTC+01:00)	Ronaldo 15'; Carvajal 55', (yellow card) 63'; Bale 68', 70'; Morata 78'	Report		Stadium: Santiago Bernabéu; Attendance: 60,174; Referee: Carlos Delgado Ferreiro (Basque Country)

5 April 2014 32	Real Sociedad	0–4	Real Madrid	San Sebastián
20:00 CEST (UTC+02:00)	González (yellow card) 48'; I. Martínez (yellow card) 56'; Bergara (yellow card) 71'	Report	Alonso (yellow card) 40'; Illarramendi 45', (yellow card) 50'; Bale 66'; Pepe 85'; Morata 88'; Carvajal (yellow card) 90+1'	Stadium: Anoeta; Attendance: 30,016; Referee: Alejandro José Hernández Hernández (Canary Islands)

12 April 2014 33	Real Madrid	4–0	Almería	Madrid
22:00 CEST (UTC+02:00)	Di María 28'; Bale 53'; Isco 56'; Morata 85'	Report		Stadium: Santiago Bernabéu; Attendance: 65,896; Referee: Juan Martínez Munuera (Valencian Community)

26 April 2014 34	Real Madrid	4–0	Osasuna	Madrid
20:00 CEST (UTC+02:00)	Ronaldo 6', 52'; Ramos 60'; Carvajal 83'	Report		Stadium: Santiago Bernabéu; Attendance: 68,930; Referee: Fernando Teixeira Vitienes (Cantabria)

4 May 2014 35	Real Madrid	2–2	Valencia	Madrid
21:00 CEST (UTC+02:00)	Di María (yellow card) 51'; Ramos 59'; Ronaldo 90+2'	Report	Mathieu 44'; Parejo 65'; Keita (yellow card) 71'; Feghouli (yellow card) 90+3'	Stadium: Santiago Bernabéu; Attendance: 76,950; Referee: Carlos Clos Gómez (Aragon)

7 May 2014 36	Real Valladolid	1–1	Real Madrid	Valladolid
21:00 CEST (UTC+02:00)	Bergdich (yellow card) 26'; Osorio 85'; Mitrović (yellow card) 89'; Baraja (yellow card) 90+1'; Jaime (yellow card) 90+4'	Report	Isco (yellow card) 27'; Ramos 35'; Morata (yellow card) 76'; Illarramendi (yellow card) 76'; Pepe (yellow card) 80'	Stadium: José Zorrilla; Attendance: 22,013; Referee: Jesús Gil Manzano (Extremadura)
Note: The match was originally scheduled for 19–20 April but was moved back due to Real Madrid's involvement in the 2014 Copa del Rey Final.

11 May 2014 37	Celta Vigo	2–0	Real Madrid	Vigo
19:00 CEST (UTC+02:00)	Orellana (yellow card) 17'; Charles 43', 63'; Cabral (yellow card) 77'	Report	Illarramendi (yellow card) 73'; Ramos (yellow card) 73'	Stadium: Balaídos; Attendance: 27,703; Referee: Alejandro José Hernández Hernández (Canary Islands)

17 May 2014 38	Real Madrid	3–1	Espanyol	Madrid
16:00 CEST (UTC+02:00)	Bale 64'; Morata 86', 90+1'	Report	Pizzi 90'	Stadium: Santiago Bernabéu; Attendance: 51,653; Referee: David Fernández Borbalán (Andalusia)

Last updated: 17 May 2014
Source: RealMadrid.com, LFP.es, LigaBBVA.com, RFEF.es

=== Copa del Rey ===
==== Round of 32 ====
7 December 2013 First leg	Olímpic de Xàtiva	0–0	Real Madrid	Xàtiva
22:00 CET (UTC+01:00)	Alcázar (yellow card) 70'; Pifarré (yellow card) 86'	Report	Casemiro (yellow card) 65'; Modrić (yellow card) 81'	Stadium: La Murta; Attendance: 8,000; Referee: David Fernández Borbalán (Andalusia)

18 December 2013 Second leg	Real Madrid	2–0 (2–0 agg.)	Olímpic de Xàtiva	Madrid
21:30 CET (UTC+01:00)	Illarramendi 16'; Di María 28' (pen.); Casemiro (yellow card) 49'; Carvajal (yellow card) 67'; Pepe (yellow card) 81'; Jesé (yellow card) 90+3'	Report	Alcázar (yellow card) 27'	Stadium: Santiago Bernabéu; Attendance: 45,627; Referee: José Antonio Teixeira Vitienes (Cantabria); Man of the Match: Di María, Isco

==== Round of 16 ====
9 January 2014 First leg	Real Madrid	2–0	Osasuna	Madrid
21:30 CET (UTC+01:00)	Benzema 19'; Jesé (yellow card) 17', (goal) 60'	Report	Oier (yellow card) 18'; Bertrán (yellow card) 83'	Stadium: Santiago Bernabéu; Attendance: 63,871; Referee: Pérez Montero (Andalusia)

15 January 2014 Second leg	Osasuna	0–2 (0–4 agg.)	Real Madrid	Pamplona
21:30 CET (UTC+01:00)	Riera (yellow card) 8'; Oier (yellow card) 10'; Loé (yellow card) 21'	Report	Ronaldo 21'; Arbeloa (yellow card) 34'; Coentrão (yellow card) 44' (yellow-red card) 85'; Di María 56'	Stadium: El Sadar; Attendance: 10,403; Referee: Antonio Mateu Lahoz (Valencian Community)

==== Quarter-finals ====
21 January 2014 First leg	Espanyol	0–1	Real Madrid	Cornellà de Llobregat
21:00 CET (UTC+01:00)	Sánchez (yellow card) 83'; Abraham (yellow card) 90+1'	Report	Benzema 25'; Ramos (yellow card) 72'	Stadium: Estadi Cornellà-El Prat; Attendance: 18,050; Referee: Carlos Clos Gómez (Aragon)

28 January 2014 Second leg	Real Madrid	1–0 (2–0 agg.)	Espanyol	Madrid
21:00 CET (UTC+01:00)	Jesé 7'; Nacho (yellow card) 41'; Ronaldo (yellow card) 67'; Ramos (yellow card) 86'	Report	Sánchez (yellow card) 36' (yellow-red card) 77'; Córdoba (yellow card) 79'; Sidnei (yellow card) 87'	Stadium: Santiago Bernabéu; Attendance: 54,500; Referee: José Antonio Teixeira Vitienes (Cantabria)

==== Semi-finals ====
5 February 2014 First leg	Real Madrid	3–0	Atlético Madrid	Madrid
20:00 CET (UTC+01:00)	Pepe 17', (yellow card) 24'; Jesé 57'; Di María 73'	Report	Diego (yellow card) 27'; Costa (yellow card) 61'; Juanfran (yellow card) 78'; Miranda (yellow card) 88'	Stadium: Santiago Bernabéu; Attendance: 77,500; Referee: Carlos Clos Gómez (Aragon)

11 February 2014 Second leg	Atlético Madrid	0–2 (0–5 agg.)	Real Madrid	Madrid
21:00 CET (UTC+01:00)	Miranda (yellow card) 80'	Report	Ronaldo 7' (pen.), 16' (pen.), (yellow card) 44'; Illarramendi (yellow card) 36'; Arbeloa (yellow card) 43'	Stadium: Vicente Calderón; Attendance: 47,600; Referee: Alberto Undiano Mallenco (Navarre)

==== Final ====
15 April 2014 Final	Barcelona	1–2	Real Madrid	Valencia
21:30 CEST (UTC+02:00)	Neymar (yellow card) 17'; Mascherano (yellow card) 53'; Bartra 68'	Report	Isco (yellow card) 3'; Di María 11'; Pepe (yellow card) 17'; Bale 85'; Alonso (yellow card) 88'	Stadium: Mestalla; Attendance: 55,000; Referee: Antonio Mateu Lahoz (Valencian Community)

Last updated: 15 April 2014
Source: Real Madrid

=== UEFA Champions League ===
==== Group stage ====
Pos	Team	Pld	W	D	L	GF	GA	GD	Pts	Qualification	RMA	GAL	JUV	CPH
1	(Spain) Real Madrid	6	5	1	0	20	5	+15	16	Advance to knockout phase	—	4–1	2–1	4–0
2	(Turkey) Galatasaray	6	2	1	3	8	14	−6	7	Advance to knockout phase	1–6	—	1–0	3–1
3	(Italy) Juventus	6	1	3	2	9	9	0	6	Transfer to Europa League	2–2	2–2	—	3–1
4	(Denmark) Copenhagen	6	1	1	4	4	13	−9	4		0–2	1–0	1–1	—

Source: UEFA

17 September 2013 1	Galatasaray (Turkey)	1–6	(Spain) Real Madrid	Istanbul, Turkey
20:45 CEST (UTC+02:00)	Melo (yellow card) 31'; Amrabat (yellow card) 66'; Bulut 84'; Riera (yellow card) 85'	Report	Isco 33'; Pepe (yellow card) 45'; Benzema 54', 81'; Ronaldo 63', 66', 90+1'	Stadium: Türk Telekom Arena; Attendance: 47,669; Referee: Mark Clattenburg (England); Man of the Match: Ronaldo

2 October 2013 2	Real Madrid (Spain)	4–0	(Denmark) Copenhagen	Madrid, Spain
20:45 CEST (UTC+02:00)	Ronaldo 21', 65'; Modrić (yellow card) 44'; Di María 71', 90+1'	Report	Braaten (yellow card) 64'; Delaney (yellow card) 88'	Stadium: Santiago Bernabéu Stadium; Attendance: 69,347; Referee: Matej Jug (Slovenia); Man of the Match: Modrić

23 October 2013 3	Real Madrid (Spain)	2–1	(Italy) Juventus	Madrid, Spain
20:45 CEST (UTC+02:00)	Ronaldo 4', 29' (pen.); Illarramendi (yellow card) 19'; Modrić (yellow card) 78'; Ramos (yellow card) 89'	Report	Llorente 14'; Vidal (yellow card) 28'; Chiellini (red card) 48'; Cáceres (yellow card) 78'	Stadium: Santiago Bernabéu Stadium; Attendance: 77,856; Referee: Manuel Gräfe (Germany); Man of the Match: Ronaldo

5 November 2013 4	Juventus (Italy)	2–2	(Spain) Real Madrid	Turin, Italy
20:45 CET (UTC+01:00)	Vidal 42' (pen.); Pirlo (yellow card) 44'; Llorente 65'; Bonucci (yellow card) 72'	Report	Modrić (yellow card) 35'; Varane (yellow card) 41'; Ronaldo 52'; Bale 60'	Stadium: Juventus Stadium; Attendance: 40,696; Referee: Howard Webb (England); Man of the Match: Ronaldo

27 November 2013 5	Real Madrid (Spain)	4–1	(Turkey) Galatasaray	Madrid, Spain
20:45 CET (UTC+01:00)	Ramos (red card) 26'; Bale 37'; Arbeloa 51', (yellow card) 55'; Di María 63'; Isco 81'	Report	Melo (yellow card) 36'; Bulut 38'	Stadium: Santiago Bernabéu Stadium; Attendance: 67,728; Referee: William Collum (Scotland); Man of the Match: Arbeloa

10 December 2013 6	Copenhagen (Denmark)	0–2	(Spain) Real Madrid	Copenhagen, Denmark
20:45 CET (UTC+01:00)	Delaney (yellow card) 89'	Report	Marcelo (yellow card) 18'; Modrić 25'; Ronaldo 48'; Alonso (yellow card) 64'	Stadium: Parken Stadium; Attendance: 37,241; Referee: Felix Brych (Germany); Man of the Match: Ronaldo

==== Knockout phase ====
===== Round of 16 =====
26 February 2014 First leg	Schalke 04 (Germany)	1–6	(Spain) Real Madrid	Gelsenkirchen, Germany
20:45 CET (UTC+01:00)	Höwedes (yellow card) 62'; Huntelaar (yellow card) 72', (goal) 90+1'	Report	Benzema 13', 57'; Bale 21', 69'; Di María (yellow card) 29'; Ronaldo 52', 89'	Stadium: Veltins-Arena; Attendance: 54,442; Referee: Howard Webb (England); Man of the Match: Bale

18 March 2014 Second leg	Real Madrid (Spain)	3–1 (9–2 agg.)	(Germany) Schalke 04	Madrid, Spain
20:45 CET (UTC+01:00)	Ronaldo 21', 74'; Illarramendi (yellow card) 58'; Morata 75'	Report	Hoogland 31'; Papadopoulos (yellow card) 79'	Stadium: Santiago Bernabéu Stadium; Attendance: 65,148; Referee: Sergei Karasev (Russia); Man of the Match: Ronaldo

===== Quarter-finals =====
2 April 2014 First leg	Real Madrid (Spain)	3–0	(Germany) Borussia Dortmund	Madrid, Spain
20:45 CEST (UTC+02:00)	Bale 3'; Isco 27'; Ronaldo 57'	Report	Reus (yellow card) 17'; Kehl (yellow card) 30'; Großkreutz (yellow card) 87'	Stadium: Santiago Bernabéu Stadium; Attendance: 70,089; Referee: Mark Clattenburg (England); Man of the Match: Isco

8 April 2014 Second leg	Borussia Dortmund (Germany)	2–0 (2–3 agg.)	(Spain) Real Madrid	Dortmund, Germany
20:45 CEST (UTC+02:00)	Reus 24', 37', (yellow card) 75'; Aubameyang (yellow card) 82'	Report	Ramos (yellow card) 27'; Alonso (yellow card) 31'; Carvajal (yellow card) 68'; Casemiro (yellow card) 83'; Benzema (yellow card) 90+2'	Stadium: Signal Iduna Park; Attendance: 65,829; Referee: Damir Skomina (Slovenia); Man of the Match: Reus

===== Semi-finals =====
23 April 2014 First leg	Real Madrid (Spain)	1–0	(Germany) Bayern Munich	Madrid, Spain
20:45 CEST (UTC+02:00)	Benzema 19'; Isco (yellow card) 57'	Report		Stadium: Santiago Bernabéu Stadium; Attendance: 79,283; Referee: Howard Webb (England); Man of the Match: Benzema

29 April 2014 Second leg	Bayern Munich (Germany)	0–4 (0–5 agg.)	(Spain) Real Madrid	Munich, Germany
20:45 CEST (UTC+02:00)	Dante (yellow card) 17'	Report	Ramos 16', 20'; Ronaldo 34', 90'; Alonso (yellow card) 38'	Stadium: Allianz Arena; Attendance: 68,000; Referee: Pedro Proença (Portugal); Man of the Match: Ramos

===== Final =====
24 May 2014 Final	Real Madrid (Spain)	4–1 (a.e.t.)	(Spain) Atlético Madrid	Lisbon, Portugal
20:45 CEST (UTC+02:00)	Ramos (yellow card) 27', (goal) 90+3'; Khedira (yellow card) 45+1'; Bale 110'; Marcelo 118', (yellow card) 118'; Ronaldo 120' (pen.), (yellow card) 120+1'; Varane (yellow card) 120+3'	Report	García (yellow card) 27'; Godín 36', (yellow card) 120'; Miranda (yellow card) 53'; Villa (yellow card) 72'; Juanfran (yellow card) 74'; Koke (yellow card) 86'; Gabi (yellow card) 100'	Stadium: Estádio da Luz; Attendance: 60,976; Referee: Björn Kuipers (Netherlands); Man of the Match: Di María

Source: UEFA
Last updated: 24 May 2014

== Statistics ==
=== Squad statistics ===
				Total				La Liga		UEFA Champions League		Copa del Rey		
N	Pos.	Name	Nat.	GS	App	Gls	Min	App	Gls	App	Gls	App	Gls	Notes
1	GK	Iker Casillas	(Spain)	24	24		2222	2		13		9		
15	RB	Dani Carvajal	(Spain)	37	45	2	3549	31	2	10		4		
3	CB	Pepe	(Portugal)	47	49	5	4430	30	4	10		9	1	
4	CB	Sergio Ramos	(Spain)	51	50	7	4558	32	4	11	3	7		
12	LB	Marcelo	(Brazil)	32	39	2	3155	28	1	7	1	4		
22	RM	Ángel Di María	(Argentina)	43	52	11	3902	34	4	11	3	7	4	
14	CM	Xabi Alonso	(Spain)	36	43		3289	27		9		7		
19	LM	Luka Modrić	(Croatia)	45	51	2	4243	34	1	11	1	6		
11	RW	Gareth Bale	(Wales)	36	44	22	3481	27	15	12	6	5	1	
9	ST	Karim Benzema	(France)	49	52	24	4176	35	17	11	5	6	2	
7	LW	Cristiano Ronaldo	(Portugal)	47	47	51	4219	30	31	11	17	6	3	
25	GK	Diego López	(Spain)	36	37		3478	36		1				
23	AM	Isco	(Spain)	35	53	11	3308	32	8	12	3	9		
24	CM	Asier Illarramendi	(Spain)	27	49	3	2625	29	2	11		9	1	
17	RB	Álvaro Arbeloa	(Spain)	26	30	1	2459	18		4	1	8		
2	CB	Raphaël Varane	(France)	17	23		1689	14		7		2		
5	LB	Fábio Coentrão	(Portugal)	18	20		1568	10		6		4		
18	CB	Nacho Fernández	(Spain)	13	19		1445	12		3		4		
6	DM	Sami Khedira	(Germany)	17	18	1	1436	13	1	5				
20	LW	Jesé	(Spain)	12	31	8	1245	18	5	5		8	3	Source
21	ST	Álvaro Morata	(Spain)	6	34	9	1106	23	8	5	1	6		
16	CM	Casemiro	(Brazil)	4	25		734	12		6		7		
13	GK	Jesús	(Spain)											
38	RB	Diego Llorente	(Spain)		1		20	1						
38	ST	Willian José	(Brazil)		1		25	1						
10	AM	Mesut Özil	(Germany)	2	2		136	2						Out on 2 Sep

Last updated: 24 May 2014
Source: Match reports in competitive matches, realmadrid.com, LFP.es, ESPN FC
Ordered by Jersey numbers
0 shown as blank

=== Goals ===
Rank	Player	Position	La Liga	Champions League	Copa del Rey	Total
1	(Portugal) Cristiano Ronaldo	LW	31	17	3	51
2	(France) Karim Benzema	ST	17	5	2	24
3	(Wales) Gareth Bale	RW	15	6	1	22
4	(Argentina) Ángel Di María	RW	4	3	4	11
4	(Spain) Isco	AM	8	3	0	11
6	(Spain) Álvaro Morata	ST	8	1	0	9
7	(Spain) Jesé	LW	5	0	3	8
8	(Spain) Sergio Ramos	CB	4	3	0	7
9	(Portugal) Pepe	CB	4	0	1	5
10	(Spain) Asier Illarramendi	CM	2	0	1	3
11	(Spain) Dani Carvajal	RB	2	0	0	2
11	(Brazil) Marcelo	LB	1	1	0	2
11	(Croatia) Luka Modrić	CM	1	1	0	2
14	(Spain) Álvaro Arbeloa	RB	0	1	0	1
14	(Germany) Sami Khedira	DM	1	0	0	1
Own goals			1	0	0	1
Total			104	41	15	160

Last updated: 24 May 2014
Source: Match reports in Competitive matches

=== Disciplinary record ===
N	P	Nat.	Name	La Liga			Champions League			Copa del Rey			Total			Notes
N	P	Nat.	Name	Yellow card	Second yellow card	Red card	Yellow card	Second yellow card	Red card	Yellow card	Second yellow card	Red card	Yellow card	Second yellow card	Red card	Notes
4	CB	(Spain)	Sergio Ramos	11		1	3		1	2			16		2	
3	CB	(Portugal)	Pepe	9			1			3			13			
17	RB	(Spain)	Álvaro Arbeloa	7			1			2			10			
19	CM	(Croatia)	Luka Modrić	6			3			1			10			
14	CM	(Spain)	Xabi Alonso	5			3			1			9			
22	RW	(Argentina)	Ángel Di María	6			1						7			
7	LW	(Portugal)	Cristiano Ronaldo	4		1	1			2			7		1	
15	RB	(Spain)	Dani Carvajal	4			1			1			6			
24	CM	(Spain)	Asier Illarramendi	3			2			1			6			
6	DM	(Germany)	Sami Khedira	4			1						5			
12	LB	(Brazil)	Marcelo	3			2						5			
11	RW	(Wales)	Gareth Bale	3									3			
18	CB	(Spain)	Nacho	2						1			3			
9	ST	(France)	Karim Benzema	2			1						3			
2	CB	(France)	Raphaël Varane	1			2						3			
23	AM	(Spain)	Isco	1			1			1			3			
16	DM	(Brazil)	Casemiro				1			2			3			
15	LB	(Portugal)	Fábio Coentrão	1							1		1	1		
21	ST	(Spain)	Álvaro Morata	2									2			
20	LW	(Spain)	Jesé							2			2			

Last updated: 24 May 2014
Source: Competitive matches for details, Soccerway and ESPN.com
Ordered by (red card) , (second yellow card) and (yellow card)
(yellow card) = Number of bookings; (second yellow card) = Number of sending offs after a second yellow card; (red card) = Number of sending offs by a direct red card.

=== Overall ===
	Total	Home	Away
Games played	60	29	30
Games won	46	26	19
Games drawn	8	1	7
Games lost	6	2	4
Biggest win	6–1 vs Galatasaray; 5–0 vs Almería; 5–0 vs Real Betis; 6–1 vs Schalke 04; 5–0 vs Rayo Vallecano	5–0 vs Rayo Vallecano	6–1 vs Galatasaray; 5–0 vs Almería; 5–0 vs Real Betis; 6–1 vs Schalke 04
Biggest loss	0–2 vs Celta Vigo	0–1 vs Atlético Madrid; 3–4 vs Barcelona	0–2 vs Celta Vigo
Biggest win (League)	5–0 vs Almería; 5–0 vs Real Betis; 5–0 vs Rayo Vallecano	5–0 vs Rayo Vallecano	5–0 vs Almería; 5–0 vs Real Betis
Biggest win (Cup)	3–0 vs Atlético Madrid	3–0 vs Atlético Madrid	2–0 vs Osasuna
Biggest win (Europe)	6–1 vs Galatasaray; 6–1 vs Schalke 04	4–0 vs Copenhagen	6–1 vs Galatasaray; 6–1 vs Schalke 04
Biggest loss (League)	0–2 vs Celta Vigo	0–1 vs Atlético Madrid; 3–4 vs Barcelona	0–2 vs Celta Vigo
Biggest loss (Cup)	—		
Biggest loss (Europe)	0–2 vs Borussia Dortmund	—	0–2 vs Borussia Dortmund
Clean sheets	29	16	13
Goals scored	160	88	68
Goals conceded	49	19	28
Goal difference	+111	+68	+40
Average GF per game	2.67	3.03	2.27
Average GA per game	0.8	0.69	0.93
Yellow cards	115	43	67
Red cards	4	2	2
More game entries	(Spain) Isco (53)	—	
Most minutes played	(Spain) Sergio Ramos (4558)	—	
Most goals	(Portugal) Cristiano Ronaldo (51)	—	
Points	148/180 (82.22%)	79/87 (90.8%)	64/90 (71.11%)
Winning rate	78.33%	89.66%	66.67%

Last updated: 24 May 2014
Source: Competitive matches

== See also ==
- 2013–14 Copa del Rey
- 2013–14 La Liga
- 2013–14 UEFA Champions League
