= 2014 Copa del Rey final =

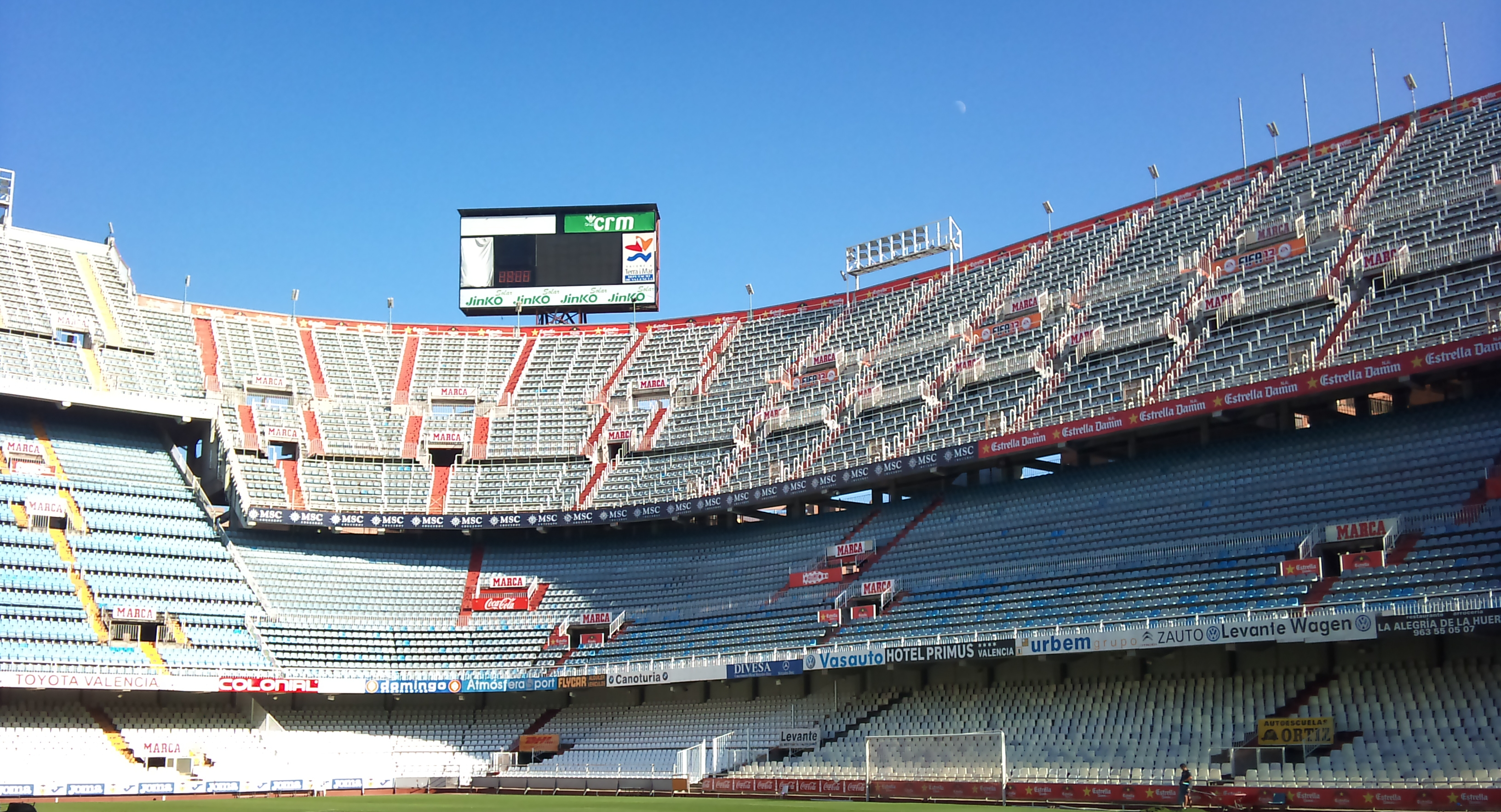
- The Mestalla Stadium in Valencia hosted the final
- Event: 2013–14 Copa del Rey
Real Madrid	Barcelona
2	1
- Date: 15 April 2014
- Venue: Mestalla, Valencia
- Man of the Match: Gareth Bale (Real Madrid)
- Referee: Antonio Mateu Lahoz
- Attendance: 52,953

The 2014 Copa del Rey final was the 112th final of Spain's premier football cup since its establishment (including two seasons where two rival editions were played). The match was an El Clásico between Real Madrid and Barcelona on 15 April 2014 at Mestalla in Valencia, making it the seventh such Copa del Rey final (the most recent was also played at the Mestalla on 20 April 2011).

Real Madrid won the cup for the 19th time after a 2–1 win. In winning the final, Real Madrid went on to play against Atlético Madrid, the winners of the 2013–14 La Liga season, in the 2014 Supercopa de España.

== Road to the final ==
Real Madrid			Round	Barcelona
Opponent	Result	Legs		Opponent	Result	Legs
Olímpic de Xàtiva	2–0	0–0 away; 2–0 home	Round of 32	Cartagena	7–1	4–1 away; 3–0 home
Osasuna	4–0	2–0 home; 2–0 away	Round of 16	Getafe	6–0	4–0 home; 2–0 away
Espanyol	2–0	1–0 away; 1–0 home	Quarter-finals	Levante	9–2	4–1 away; 5–1 home
Atlético Madrid	5–0	3–0 home; 2–0 away	Semi-finals	Real Sociedad	3–1	2–0 home; 1–1 away

== Build-up ==
The match was rescheduled to be played three days earlier than the original date as there was a chance that both clubs could have UEFA Champions League semi-finals the following week. Each team was allotted 20,000 tickets for club members. Real Madrid's top scorer of the season Cristiano Ronaldo missed the final due to knee and thigh injuries.

Real Madrid were appearing in their 39th Copa del Rey Final, with a prior tally of 18 victories, while Barcelona had won 26 of their 35 finals. The two teams had each won three of the six previous El Clásico finals: Real Madrid in 1936, 1974 and 2011, Barcelona in 1968, 1983 and 1990. The 2011 win was Real Madrid's most recent, having been defeated in the 2013 final. Barcelona had last won the cup in 2012.

== Match ==
=== Summary ===
External videos
- Gareth Bale's incredible goal against Barcelona | Copa del Rey Final 2014 on YouTube

After 11 minutes Real Madrid went in front when Ángel Di María's low left footed shot from the left went through Jordi Alba's legs and in off goalkeeper José Manuel Pinto's left hand. Barcelona were level in the 68th minute when Marc Bartra headed into the far corner of the net after a Xavi corner from the left.

The winning goal came with five minutes to go when Gareth Bale picked the ball up just inside his own half on the left wing and went past Bartra at a blistering pace (at one point off the field before running back onto the field) leaving Bartra in his wake, before running into the penalty area, evading more challenges and then composedly slotting the ball left-footed low past the goalkeeper from six yards out. Some football pundits labelled his goal as a masterclass, whilst Barcelona coach Gerardo Martino admitted that it was "difficult to see a player sprint like that at that stage of the game".

=== Details ===
15 April 2014
21:30 CEST

Real Madrid	2–1	Barcelona
Di María 11'; Bale 85'	Report	Bartra 68'

Mestalla, Valencia
Attendance: 52,953
Referee: Mateu Lahoz (Valencian committee)

Real Madrid	Barcelona

GK	1	(Spain) Iker Casillas (c)
RB	15	(Spain) Dani Carvajal
CB	3	(Portugal) Pepe	(yellow card) 17'
CB	4	(Spain) Sergio Ramos
LB	5	(Portugal) Fábio Coentrão
DM	14	(Spain) Xabi Alonso	(yellow card) 88'
CM	19	(Croatia) Luka Modrić
CM	23	(Spain) Isco	(yellow card) 3'	(substituted off) 89'
RW	22	(Argentina) Ángel Di María		(substituted off) 86'
LW	11	(Wales) Gareth Bale
CF	9	(France) Karim Benzema		(substituted off) 90'
Substitutes:
GK	25	(Spain) Diego López
DF	2	(France) Raphaël Varane		(substituted on) 90'
MF	16	(Brazil) Casemiro		(substituted on) 89'
MF	18	(Spain) Nacho
MF	24	(Spain) Asier Illarramendi		(substituted on) 86'
FW	21	(Spain) Álvaro Morata
FW	39	(Brazil) Willian José
Manager:
(Italy) Carlo Ancelotti

GK	13	(Spain) José Manuel Pinto
RB	22	(Brazil) Dani Alves
CB	15	(Spain) Marc Bartra		(substituted off) 87'
CB	14	(Argentina) Javier Mascherano	(yellow card) 53'
LB	18	(Spain) Jordi Alba		(substituted off) 46'
DM	16	(Spain) Sergio Busquets
CM	6	(Spain) Xavi (c)
CM	8	(Spain) Andrés Iniesta
RW	11	(Brazil) Neymar	(yellow card) 17'
LW	4	(Spain) Cesc Fàbregas		(substituted off) 60'
CF	10	(Argentina) Lionel Messi
Substitutes:
GK	25	(Spain) Oier
DF	5	(Spain) Carles Puyol
DF	21	(Brazil) Adriano		(substituted on) 46'
MF	17	(Cameroon) Alex Song
MF	24	(Spain) Sergi Roberto
FW	7	(Spain) Pedro		(substituted on) 60'
FW	9	(Chile) Alexis Sánchez		(substituted on) 87'
Manager:
(Argentina) Gerardo Martino

== See also ==
- El Clásico
