= Isco =

Spanish footballer (born 1992)

- Isco with Real Madrid in 2018

Personal information
- Full name: Francisco Román Alarcón Suárez
- Date of birth: 21 April 1992 (age 34)
- Place of birth: Benalmádena, Spain
- Height: 1.76 m (5 ft 9 in)
- Positions: Attacking midfielder; winger

Team information
- Current team: Betis
- Number: 22

Youth career
- 1997–1999: PDM Benalmádena
- 1999–2006: Atlético Benamiel
- 2006–2009: Valencia

Senior career*
Years	Team	Apps	(Gls)
2009–2011	Valencia B	52	(16)
2010–2011	Valencia	4	(0)
2011–2013	Málaga	69	(14)
2013–2022	Real Madrid	246	(37)
2022	Sevilla	12	(0)
2023–	Betis	71	(20)

International career^{‡}
2008	Spain U16	3	(1)
2008–2009	Spain U17	21	(6)
2010	Spain U18	1	(1)
2010–2011	Spain U19	12	(7)
2011	Spain U20	6	(1)
2011–2014	Spain U21	19	(14)
2012	Spain U23	5	(0)
2013–	Spain	39	(12)
Medal record
Men's football
Representing Spain
UEFA Nations League
Runner-up	2025 Germany
FIFA U-17 World Cup
Third place	2009 Nigeria	Team
UEFA European Under-21 Championship
Winner	2013 Israel	Team
- * Club domestic league appearances and goals as of 23:49, 21 November 2026 (UTC) ‡ National team caps and goals as of 8 June 2025 (UTC)

Francisco Román Alarcón Suárez (Spanish pronunciation: [fɾanˈθisk roˈman alaɾˈkon ˈswaɾeθ]; born 21 April 1992), commonly known as Isco ([ˈisko]), is a Spanish professional footballer who plays as an attacking midfielder or left winger for La Liga club Real Betis, which he captains, and the Spain national team.

Isco began his career at Valencia, playing mainly in its reserve team, before joining Málaga in 2011. His performances at Málaga earned him the Golden Boy award in 2012, and a €65 million move to Real Madrid in June 2013, with whom he won 19 major trophies including five UEFA Champions League titles, three La Liga titles, one Copa del Rey and four FIFA Club World Cup titles. He left Real Madrid at the end of the 2021–22 season and then joined Sevilla. In December 2022, his contract was mutually terminated and he spent the rest of the season without a club, before joining Betis in July 2023.

Isco represented Spain at various youth levels, including at the 2012 Olympics, and made his senior international debut in 2013, later taking part at the 2018 FIFA World Cup.He also won the golden boy in 2012 while in Malaga

== Club career ==
=== Valencia ===
Isco was born in Benalmadena, Málaga, Andalusia. As a child he played for Atlético Benamiel. A product of Valencia's youth system, he spent the 2009–10 season with the club's reserve team in Segunda División B, netting once in 26 games and suffering relegation.

While still registered with the reserves, Isco made his debut with the first team on 11 November 2010, against Logroñés in the 2010–11 Copa del Rey, scoring two goals in a 4–1 home win (Paco Alcácer made his senior debut in the same fixture). He played his first La Liga match three days later, featuring for 20 minutes in a 2–0 home win against Getafe after coming on as a substitute for Aritz Aduriz; he thereafter made three further league appearances and two in the UEFA Champions League, all from the bench, and helped the B-team return to the third level by scoring 15 goals in their campaign.

=== Málaga ===
In mid-July 2011, Isco moved back to his home province and signed a five-year contract with Málaga after the club activated his buy-out clause of €6 million. He scored his first goal for his new team on 21 November 2011, starting in a 3–1 away win against Racing de Santander; he netted again the following week in a 2–1 win against Villarreal, and finished his first season with 32 games and five goals as the side qualified for the UEFA Champions League for the first time in its history.

On 18 September 2012, in Málaga's first game in the Champions League group stage, Isco netted twice in a 3–0 home win over Zenit, also being chosen as Man of the Match. On 22 December he scored the first goal in an eventual 3–2 win against Real Madrid at La Rosaleda, leading the locals to their first victory over that opponent in 29 years; in December he won the Golden Boy award, beating Stephan El Shaarawy and Thibaut Courtois.

On 28 January 2013, Isco ended speculation regarding his future by signing a new contract with Málaga – his new buyout clause was set at €35 million. He scored his eleventh goal of the campaign on 13 March, netting the opener in a 2–0 home win against Porto, good enough for last-eight qualification after the 0–1 first leg loss at the Estádio do Dragão.

=== Real Madrid ===
On 17 June 2013, Isco confirmed that he had received offers from Real Madrid and former Málaga manager Manuel Pellegrini's Manchester City, but stated he would only make a final decision on his future after the UEFA European Under-21 Championship final. On 26 June, Real Madrid president Florentino Pérez confirmed that a deal had been reached with the player and that he would be presented by the club next week, once he passed his medical; the following day he signed a five-year contract, with Real Madrid paying €30 million for his services, thus becoming the first signing of newly appointed manager Carlo Ancelotti.

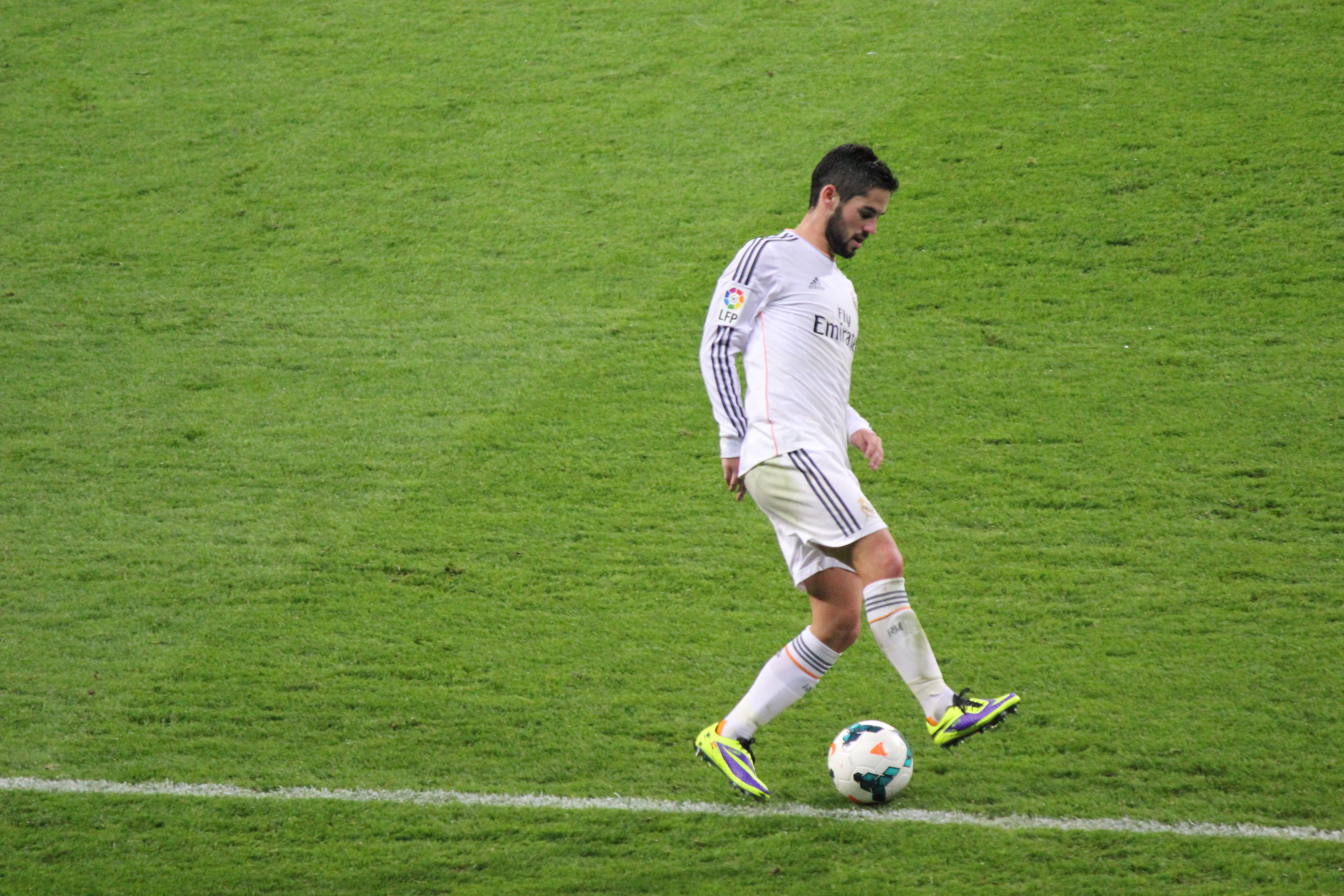
Isco with Real Madrid in 2013

On 18 August 2013 Isco made his official debut for the Merengues, recording an assist and scoring the winning goal in a 2–1 home win over Real Betis, the latter coming through an 85th-minute header. He continued with his form by netting two goals against Athletic Bilbao on 1 September (3–1, also at the Santiago Bernabéu).

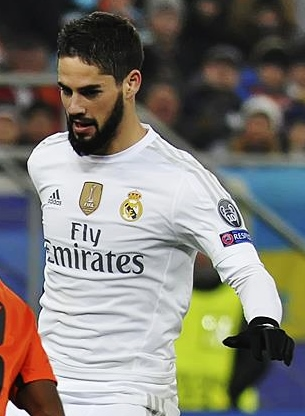
Isco playing for Real Madrid in 2015

In spite of continuing to score regularly when featured, Isco received limited opportunities in the first team due to the 4–3–3 formation not being suited for his style, but Ancelotti stated that it was "a temporary problem". He scored 11 goals in 53 official games in his first season. He played 61 minutes in the Champions League final, a 4–1 win over Atlético Madrid in Lisbon.

Isco started the first game of the 2014–15 season against Real Sociedad, and scored the first in a 4–1 win against Almería on 12 December 2014. He was a regular starter in the club's FIFA Club World Cup winning campaign, scoring the last in a 4–0 semi-final routing of Cruz Azul. His performances over the season earned him many plaudits, and he was compared to Zinedine Zidane by the French legend himself.

Prior to the start of the 2015–16 season, Isco switched his shirt number from 23 to 22, which he had previously worn at Málaga. On 21 November 2015, as Real lost 0–4 at home to Barcelona in El Clásico, he was sent off in the 84th minute for a foul on Neymar. He scored twice on 2 December, as the team won 3–1 at Cádiz in the first leg of the last 32 of the domestic cup. Isco was a part-time starter when the team won the 2015–16 UEFA Champions League defeating Atlético Madrid 5–3 on penalties in the final played at the San Siro in Milan, Italy.

He appeared 30 times during the 2016–17 season, as Real Madrid won the La Liga title; he also started in the 2016–17 UEFA Champions League final against Juventus in Cardiff, which Madrid won 4–1.

On 8 August 2017, Isco scored a goal in the 2017 UEFA Super Cup, contributing to Real Madrid's 2–1 victory against Manchester United. His performance earned him the man of the match award. In September 2017, he signed a new deal with Real Madrid until June 2022. During the 2017–18 UEFA Champions League, he made eleven appearances, when Madrid won their third consecutive and 13th overall Champions League title as they beat Liverpool 3–1 in Kyiv. He made 23 appearances during the league season, as Real Madrid won the 2019–20 La Liga. In the 2021–22 season he was not an important player under Carlo Ancelotti as Real Madrid triumphed in 2021–22 La Liga and the 2021–22 UEFA Champions League. On 30 May 2022, Isco confirmed on social media that he was leaving the club after nine years.

=== Sevilla ===
On 7 August 2022, Sevilla announced that the club reached an agreement in principle for the signing of Isco, with the player agreeing to a two-year contract. On 21 December 2022, Isco and Sevilla agreed to terminate their contract. On 22 December, Sevilla coach Jorge Sampaoli said Isco "did not meet the club's expectations".

In the January transfer window, Isco came close to signing with Bundesliga club Union Berlin. However, on 31 January 2023, the deal collapsed, despite him passing medical tests, as the German club claimed that he made new demands that differed from the original agreement. However Isco’s representatives also claimed that Union Berlin has amended the contract the moment before Isco was going to sign it, in terms of both sporting terms and salary.

=== Betis ===
On 26 July 2023, Isco joined Sevilla's rivals Real Betis on a one-year deal. On 13 August 2023, during the opening matchday of La Liga, Isco played his first game for Betis, facing off against Villarreal. Later, on 28 August, he netted his first goal for Betis when they played against Athletic Bilbao, marking an end to his year-long absence from the scoresheet. However, despite his goal, Betis suffered a 4–2 defeat.

On 28 December 2023, Isco extended his contract with Betis until June 2027. In the 2023–24 season, he was the player with most man of the match awards in La Liga, having received it in 19 occasions. He also became one of Real Betis' captains following the departure of Andrés Guardado, first wearing the captain's armband in a league match against Mallorca on 27 January 2024.

In the 2024–2025 season, Isco led Real Betis to the UEFA Europa Conference League Final—the club’s first-ever European final. On May 28, 2025, he assisted Abde Ezzalzouli’s opening goal, but Betis ultimately suffered a 4–1 defeat to Chelsea F.C in the final. Despite the loss, Isco was named the UEFA Europa Conference League Player of the Season: 2024–25

== International career ==
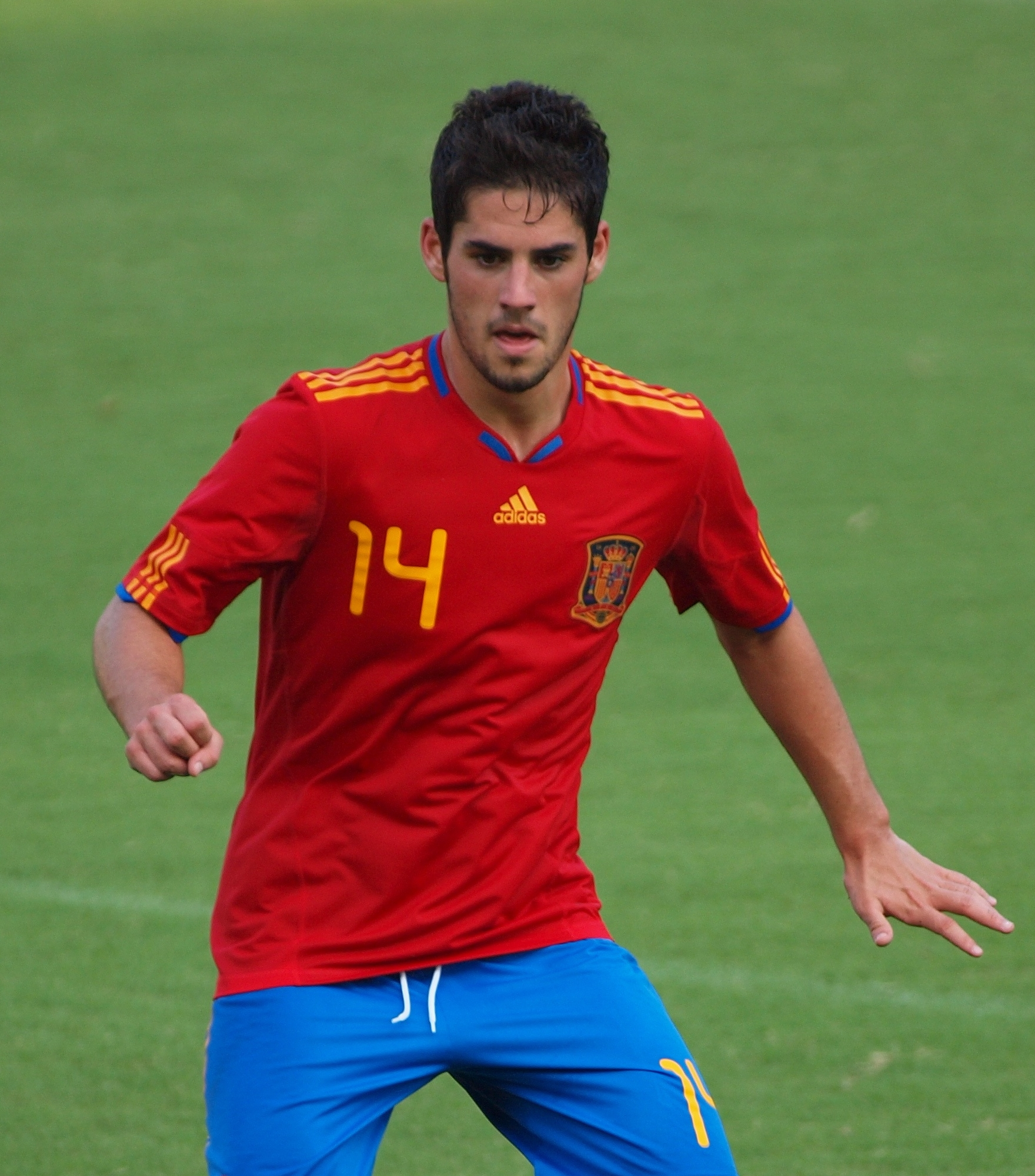
Isco in 2010

Isco appeared with Spain's U17 in 2009 World Cup, scoring three times in the process as the team finished third. In 2011, he represented his country – together with Málaga teammate Recio – in the U-20 World Cup held in Colombia, netting one goal in an eventual quarter-final exit.

On 28 February 2012, Isco was called to the Spain under-23s team for a friendly against Egypt, but did not leave the bench. On 15 May he was picked for the first time to the senior team for friendlies with Serbia and South Korea, but took no part in either match. In July, he went with the under-23 team to the Olympics in London, starting all of Spain's matches as they were eliminated without scoring a goal.

On 6 February 2013, Isco made his debut with the main squad, playing the last 30 minutes in a 3–1 win over Uruguay in Doha, Qatar. Also that year he appeared at the UEFA European Under-21 Championship in Israel, he scored in the final and finished the competition with the Bronze Boot (3 Goals) and made the team of the tournament as a key player for the eventual winners.

Isco scored his first international goal for Spain in a UEFA Euro 2016 qualifying match against Belarus in Huelva on 15 November 2014, opening a 3–0 win.

Isco scored his first hat-trick for Spain on 27 March 2018, netting three goals against Argentina in a 6–1 friendly win.

In May 2018, Isco was named in Spain's final squad for the 2018 FIFA World Cup. He scored his first and only goal in the last group stage match against Morocco, in an eventual 2–2 draw. His goal helped the team to qualify to the second round as group winners.

In May 2021, Isco was omitted from Spain's 26-man squad for UEFA Euro 2020.

On 26 May 2025, Isco was recalled to the squad by manager Luis de la Fuente for the UEFA Nations League Finals in Germany, marking his return after a six-year absence. In the final against Portugal on 8 June, he successfully converted his penalty attempt in a 5–3 shootout loss, following a 2–2 draw.

== Style of play ==
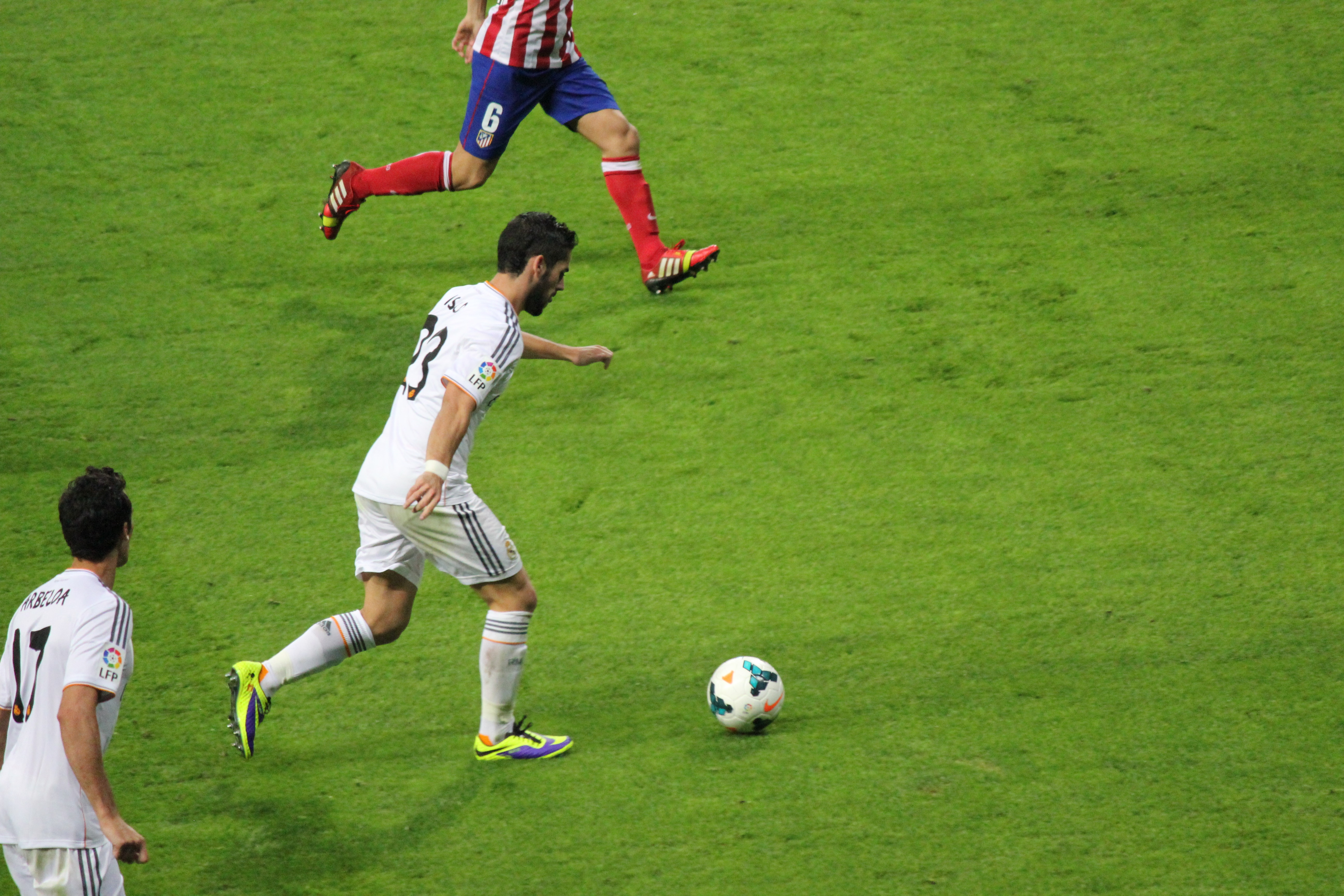
Isco is known for his dribbling ability.

Isco began his career as an attacking midfielder or as a second striker: at Málaga, under Manuel Pellegrini, he often played in an attacking role in the team's 4–2–3–1 formation. Following his move to Real Madrid, manager Carlo Ancelotti also played him in a deep-lying playmaker role requiring more sacrifice and defensive duties than his natural position. He has also been deployed as a winger on occasion.

Isco is known for his ability to pick out a good pass, dribble or shoot into the top corner of the goal. His reading of the game, his anticipation of space and the general directing of his side's performances are his most common traits.

In 2013, Isco was credited by Marca journalist Pablo Polo as being "the most promising young player in Spanish football", comparing his strength, skill, and low centre of gravity to Sergio Agüero, and his vision and passing abilities to Zinedine Zidane. Former Real Madrid captain Iker Casillas predicted in 2015 that Isco would become Spain's most important player.

== Personal life ==
Isco dated Victoria Calderon; the couple had a son. He has two more sons with actress Sara Sálamo.

== Career statistics ==
=== Club ===
As of match played 21 November 2026

Appearances and goals by club, season and competition
Club	Season	League			Copa del Rey		Europe		Other		Total	
Club	Season	Division	Apps	Goals	Apps	Goals	Apps	Goals	Apps	Goals	Apps	Goals
Valencia Mestalla	2009–10	Segunda División B	26	1	—		—		—		26	1
Valencia Mestalla	2010–11	Tercera División	26	15	—		—		2 (Note: Appearances in Tercera División promotion play-offs)	0	28	15
Valencia Mestalla	Total		52	16	—		—		2	0	54	16
Valencia	2010–11	La Liga	4	0	1	2	2 (Note: Appearances in UEFA Champions League)	0	—		7	2
Málaga	2011–12	La Liga	32	5	3	0	—		—		35	5
Málaga	2012–13	La Liga	37	9	0	0	10	3	—		47	12
Málaga	Total		69	14	3	0	10	3	—		82	17
Real Madrid	2013–14	La Liga	32	8	9	0	12	3	—		53	11
Real Madrid	2014–15	La Liga	34	4	4	1	11	0	4 (Note: One appearance in UEFA Super Cup, one appearance in Supercopa de España, two appearances and one goal in FIFA Club World Cup)	1	53	6
Real Madrid	2015–16	La Liga	31	3	1	2	11	0	—		43	5
Real Madrid	2016–17	La Liga	30	10	4	0	6	1	2 (Note: One appearance in UEFA Super Cup, one appearance in FIFA Club World Cup)	0	42	11
Real Madrid	2017–18	La Liga	30	7	4	1	11	0	4 (Note: One appearance and one goal in UEFA Super Cup, one appearance in Supercopa de España, two appearances in FIFA Club World Cup)	1	49	9
Real Madrid	2018–19	La Liga	27	3	4	2	4	1	2 (Note: One appearance in UEFA Super Cup, one appearance in FIFA Club World Cup)	0	37	6
Real Madrid	2019–20	La Liga	23	1	1	0	4	1	2 (Note: Appearances in Supercopa de España)	1	30	3
Real Madrid	2020–21	La Liga	25	0	1	0	3	0	0	0	29	0
Real Madrid	2021–22	La Liga	14	1	3	1	0	0	0	0	17	2
Real Madrid	Total		246	37	31	7	62	6	14	3	353	53
Sevilla	2022–23	La Liga	12	0	1	0	6	1	—		19	1
Betis	2023–24	La Liga	29	8	1	0	6 (Note: Appearance(s) in UEFA Europa League)	1	—		36	9
Betis	2024–25	La Liga	22	9	2	1	9 (Note: Appearances in UEFA Conference League)	2	—		33	12
Betis	2025–26	La Liga	8	1	0	0	1	0	—		9	1
Betis	2026–27	La Liga	12	2	1	0	4	2	—		17	4
Betis	Total		71	20	4	1	20	5	—		95	26
Career total			454	87	40	10	100	15	16	3	610	115

=== International ===
As of match played 8 June 2025

Appearances and goals by national team and year
National team	Year	Apps	Goals
Spain	2013	2	0
Spain	2014	4	1
Spain	2015	6	0
Spain	2016	5	1
Spain	2017	8	5
Spain	2018	11	5
Spain	2019	2	0
Spain	2020	0	0
Spain	2021	0	0
Spain	2022	0	0
Spain	2023	0	0
Spain	2024	0	0
Spain	2025	1	0
Total		39	12

Scores and results list Spain's goal tally first, score column indicates score after each Isco goal.

List of international goals scored by Isco
No.	Date	Venue	Opponent	Score	Result	Competition
1	15 November 2014	Nuevo Colombino, Huelva, Spain	Belarus	1–0	3–0	UEFA Euro 2016 qualification
2	15 November 2016	Wembley Stadium, London, England	England	2–2	2–2	Friendly
3	24 March 2017	El Molinón, Gijón, Spain	Israel	4–1	4–1	2018 FIFA World Cup qualification
4	2 September 2017	Santiago Bernabéu, Madrid, Spain	Italy	1–0	3–0	2018 FIFA World Cup qualification
5	2 September 2017	Santiago Bernabéu, Madrid, Spain	Italy	2–0	3–0	2018 FIFA World Cup qualification
6	5 September 2017	Rheinpark Stadion, Vaduz, Liechtenstein	Liechtenstein	4–0	8–0	2018 FIFA World Cup qualification
7	6 October 2017	José Rico Pérez, Alicante, Spain	Albania	2–0	3–0	2018 FIFA World Cup qualification
8	27 March 2018	Metropolitano Stadium, Madrid, Spain	Argentina	2–0	6–1	Friendly
9	27 March 2018	Metropolitano Stadium, Madrid, Spain	Argentina	3–1	6–1	Friendly
10	27 March 2018	Metropolitano Stadium, Madrid, Spain	Argentina	6–1	6–1	Friendly
11	25 June 2018	Kaliningrad Stadium, Kaliningrad, Russia	Morocco	1–1	2–2	2018 FIFA World Cup
12	11 September 2018	Martínez Valero, Elche, Spain	Croatia	6–0	6–0	2018–19 UEFA Nations League A

== Honours ==
Valencia Mestalla

- Tercera División Group VI: 2010–11

Real Madrid

- La Liga: 2016–17, 2019–20, 2021–22
- Copa del Rey: 2013–14
- Supercopa de España: 2017, 2020, 2022
- UEFA Champions League: 2013–14, 2015–16, 2016–17, 2017–18, 2021–22
- UEFA Super Cup: 2014, 2016, 2017
- FIFA Club World Cup: 2014, 2016, 2017, 2018

Real Betis

- UEFA Conference League runner-up: 2024–25

Spain U17

- FIFA U-17 World Cup third place: 2009

Spain U21

- UEFA European Under-21 Championship: 2013

Spain

- UEFA Nations League runner-up: 2024–25

Individual

- Golden Boy Award: 2012
- La Liga Breakthrough Player: 2012
- UEFA European Under-21 Championship Bronze Boot: 2013
- UEFA European Under-21 Championship Team of the Tournament: 2013
- Trofeo Bravo: 2013
- UEFA Champions League Team of the Season: 2016–17
- La Liga Player of the Month: April 2024, March 2025
- La Liga Play of the Month: April 2024 (with Nabil Fekir)
- La Liga Team of the Season: 2023–24, 2024–25
- UEFA Conference League Player of the Season: 2024–25
- UEFA Conference League Team of the Season: 2024–25
- The Athletic La Liga Team of the Season: 2024–25
