= Carlos Pifarré =

Spanish footballer

Personal information
- Full name: Carlos Pifarré Forner
- Date of birth: 5 May 1990 (age 36)
- Place of birth: La Vall d'Uixó, Spain
- Height: 1.75 m (5 ft 9 in)
- Position: Midfielder

Team information
- Current team: Oxford City

Youth career
- Villarreal

Senior career*
Years	Team	Apps	(Gls)
2009–2010	Almansa	32	(5)
2010–2011	Atlético Saguntino	30	(3)
2011–2012	Dénia	32	(3)
2012–2013	Murcia B	29	(9)
2012–2013	Murcia	3	(0)
2013–2015	Olímpic Xàtiva	43	(2)
2015–	Oxford City	24	(3)
- * Club domestic league appearances and goals as of 00:54, 11 March 2016 (UTC)

Carlos Pifarré Forner (born 5 May 1990) is a Spanish professional footballer who played for Oxford City as a midfielder.

== Football career ==
Born in La Vall d'Uixó, Castellón, Valencian Community, Pifarré finished his formation with Villarreal CF, making his senior debuts with UD Almansa in the 2009–10 season, in Tercera División. In 2011, he first arrived in Segunda División B, signing with CD Dénia.

In July 2012 Pifarré joined Real Murcia, initially assigned to the reserves in the fourth level. On 30 November he made his professional debut, coming on as a late substitute in a 0–0 home draw against Real Madrid Castilla in the Segunda División championship. He finished the season with only three first-team appearances, all from the bench.

On 7 July 2013 Pifarré moved to CD Olímpic de Xàtiva in division three.

During the summer of 2015 he moved to Oxford City of National League South, the 6th tier of English football, failing to impress as the club finished in a mid table position and being released at the end of his contract.
