= 2016–17 Borussia Dortmund season =

2016–17 season of Borussia Dortmund

Borussia Dortmund
2016–17 season
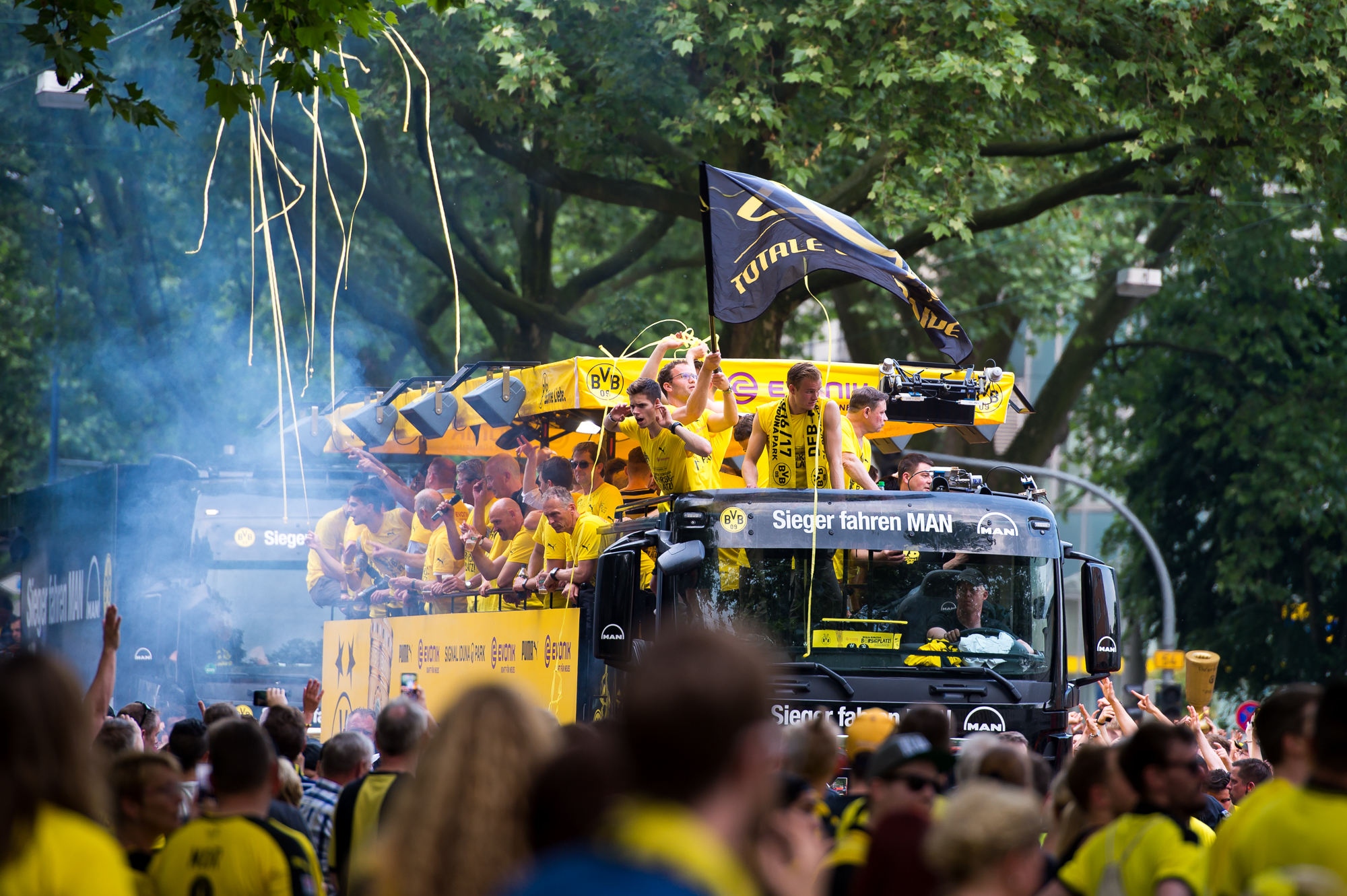
- Borussia Dortmund players celebrating their 2016–17 DFB-Pokal victory
- President: Reinhard Rauball
- Head coach: Thomas Tuchel
- Stadium: Signal Iduna Park
- Bundesliga: 3rd
- DFB-Pokal: Winners
- DFL-Supercup: Runners-up
- UEFA Champions League: Quarter-finals
- Top goalscorer: League: Pierre-Emerick Aubameyang (31); All: Pierre-Emerick Aubameyang (40)
- Highest home attendance: 81,360
- Lowest home attendance: 55,094
- Average home league attendance: 79,653
- Biggest win: Legia 0–6 Dortmund; Dortmund 6–0 Darmstadt
- Biggest defeat: Bayern 4–1 Dortmund
| Home colours | Away colours | Third colours |

The 2016–17 Borussia Dortmund season was the 106th season (and 107th overall year) in the football club's history and the 41st consecutive and 50th overall season in the top flight of German football, the Bundesliga, having been promoted from the 2. Bundesliga in 1976.

In addition to the domestic league, Borussia Dortmund also participated in this season's editions of the domestic cup, the DFB-Pokal, and the first-tier continental cup, the UEFA Champions League. This was the 44th season for the club in the Westfalenstadion, located in Dortmund, Germany. The stadium had a capacity of 81,360 for Bundesliga matches, and 65,851 for continental matches. The season covered a period from 1 July 2016 to 30 June 2017.

The season was the first since 2006–07 without Mats Hummels, who departed to FC Bayern Munich, though he later returned to Dortmund for the 2019–20 season.

== Players ==
=== Squad ===
Note: Flags indicate national team as defined under FIFA eligibility rules; some limited exceptions apply. Players may hold more than one non-FIFA nationality.

| No. | Pos. | Nation | Player |
|---|---|---|---|
| 1 | GK | GER | Roman Weidenfeller |
| 3 | DF | KOR | Park Joo-ho |
| 5 | DF | ESP | Marc Bartra |
| 6 | MF | GER | Sven Bender |
| 7 | MF | FRA | Ousmane Dembélé |
| 8 | MF | TUR | Nuri Şahin |
| 9 | MF | TUR | Emre Mor |
| 10 | MF | GER | Mario Götze |
| 11 | FW | GER | Marco Reus (vice-captain) |
| 13 | DF | POR | Raphaël Guerreiro |
| 14 | FW | SWE | Alexander Isak |
| 17 | FW | GAB | Pierre-Emerick Aubameyang |
| 18 | MF | GER | Sebastian Rode |
| 21 | MF | GER | André Schürrle |
| 22 | MF | USA | Christian Pulisic |

| No. | Pos. | Nation | Player |
|---|---|---|---|
| 23 | MF | JPN | Shinji Kagawa |
| 24 | MF | ESP | Mikel Merino |
| 25 | DF | GRE | Sokratis Papastathopoulos |
| 26 | DF | POL | Łukasz Piszczek |
| 27 | MF | GER | Gonzalo Castro |
| 28 | DF | GER | Matthias Ginter |
| 29 | DF | GER | Marcel Schmelzer (captain) |
| 30 | MF | GER | Felix Passlack |
| 32 | MF | GER | Dženis Burnić |
| 33 | MF | GER | Julian Weigl |
| 34 | MF | DEN | Jacob Bruun Larsen |
| 37 | DF | GER | Erik Durm |
| 38 | GK | SUI | Roman Bürki |
| 39 | GK | GER | Hendrik Bonmann |

=== Transfers ===
==== In ====
| No. | Pos. | Nat. | Name | Age | EU | Moving from | Type | Transfer window | Ends | Transfer fee | Source |
|---|---|---|---|---|---|---|---|---|---|---|---|
| 24 | MF | (Spain) | Mikel Merino | 20 | EU | (Spain) Osasuna | Transfer | Summer | 2021 | €3.75M | Borussia Dortmund |
| 35 | LB | (Germany) | Jannik Bandowski | 22 | EU | (Germany) 1860 Munich | End of loan | Summer | 2017 | Free | |
| 7 | FW | (France) | Ousmane Dembélé | 19 | EU | (France) Stade Rennais | Transfer | Summer | 2021 | €8M | Borussia Dortmund |
| 5 | CB | (Spain) | Marc Bartra | 25 | EU | (Spain) Barcelona | Transfer | Summer | 2020 | €8M | Borussia Dortmund |
| 18 | MF | (Germany) | Sebastian Rode | 25 | EU | (Germany) Bayern Munich | Transfer | Summer | 2020 | €14M | Borussia Dortmund |
| 9 | FW | (Turkey) | Emre Mor | 18 | EU | (Denmark) Nordsjælland | Transfer | Summer | 2021 | €9.5M | Borussia Dortmund |
| 16 | RW | (Poland) | Jakub Błaszczykowski | 30 | EU | (Italy) Fiorentina | End of loan | Summer | 2018 | Free | |
| 13 | LB | (Portugal) | Raphaël Guerreiro | 22 | EU | (France) Lorient | Transfer | Summer | 2020 | €12M | Borussia Dortmund |
| 10 | MF | (Germany) | Mario Götze | 24 | EU | (Germany) Bayern Munich | Transfer | Summer | 2020 | €26M | Borussia Dortmund |
| 21 | FW | (Germany) | André Schürrle | 25 | EU | (Germany) Wolfsburg | Transfer | Summer | 2021 | €30M | Borussia Dortmund |
| 14 | FW | (Sweden) | Alexander Isak | 17 | EU | (Sweden) AIK | Transfer | Winter | 2022 | €8.6M | Borussia Dortmund |

Total Spending: ▼€119.85M

==== Out ====
| No. | Pos. | Nat. | Name | Age | EU | Moving to | Type | Transfer window | Transfer fee | Source |
|---|---|---|---|---|---|---|---|---|---|---|
| 15 | CB | (Germany) | Mats Hummels | 27 | EU | (Germany) Bayern Munich | Transfer | Summer | €35M | FC Bayern Munich |
| 8 | MF | (Germany) | İlkay Gündoğan | 25 | EU | (England) Manchester City | Transfer | Summer | €27M | Manchester City F.C. |
| 10 | MF | (Armenia) | Henrikh Mkhitaryan | 27 | EU | (England) Manchester United | Transfer | Summer | €42M | Manchester United F.C. |
| 16 | RW | (Poland) | Jakub Błaszczykowski | 30 | EU | (Germany) Wolfsburg | Transfer | Summer | €5M | VfL Wolfsburg |
| 14 | MF | (Germany) | Moritz Leitner | 23 | EU | (Italy) Lazio | Transfer | Summer | €2M | S.S. Lazio |
| 20 | FW | (Colombia) | Adrián Ramos | 31 | Non-EU | (China) Chongqing Lifan | Transfer | Winter | €12M | Marca |
| 4 | CB | (Serbia) | Neven Subotić | 28 | EU | (Germany) Köln | Loan | Winter | Free | 1. FC Köln |

Total Income: ▲€123M

Total Expenditure: ▲€3.15M

== Friendly matches ==
Win Draw Loss

| 8 July 2016 Friendly | SpVgg Erkenschwick | 2–5 | Borussia Dortmund | Oer-Erkenschwick, Germany |
| 19:00 CEST (UTC+2) | Konarski 83'; Abulhanov 90' | Report | Dembélé 3'; Konarski 15' (o.g.); Passlack 49'; Zimmermann 72'; Castro 80' | Stadium: Stimberg-Stadion; Attendance: 3,500; Referee: Sören Storks |

| 9 July 2016 Friendly | Wuppertaler SV | 0–2 | Borussia Dortmund | Wuppertal, Germany |
| 15:30 CEST (UTC+2) | | Report | Ramos 22'; Pieper 86' | Stadium: Stadion am Zoo; Attendance: 5,400 |

| 14 July 2016 Friendly | Borussia Dortmund | 3–2 | FC St. Pauli | Brixen im Thale, Austria |
| 18:30 CEST (UTC+2) | Aubameyang 4', 18' (pen.); Mangala 88' | Report | Empen 61', 79' | Stadium: Sportplatz Brixen; Attendance: 1,100 |

| 16 July 2016 Friendly | 1860 Munich | 1–0 | Borussia Dortmund | Munich, Germany |
| 17:00 CEST (UTC+2) | Ayçiçek 36' | Report | | Stadium: Städtisches Stadion an der Grünwalder Straße; Attendance: 12,500 |

| 5 August 2016 Friendly | Borussia Dortmund | 1–1 | Sunderland | Altach, Austria |
| 19:00 CEST (UTC+2) | Şahin 17' | Report | Koné 66' | Stadium: Cashpoint-Arena; Attendance: 5,238 |

| 9 August 2016 Friendly | Borussia Dortmund | 0–1 | Athletic Bilbao | St. Gallen, Switzerland |
| 18:45 CEST (UTC+2) | | Report | Susaeta 20' | Stadium: kybunpark Attendance: 7,127 |

| 15 August 2016 Friendly | SV Sandhausen | 0–3 | Borussia Dortmund | Sandhausen, Germany |
| 18:00 CEST (UTC+2) | | Report | Schürrle 8', 59'; Mor 52' | Stadium: Hardtwaldstadion; Attendance: 9,630 |

| 23 August 2016 Friendly | Hallescher FC | 0–3 | Borussia Dortmund | Halle, Germany |
| 18:00 CEST (UTC+2) | | Report | Pulisic 23'; Ramos 45' (pen.); Al Ghaddioui 71' | Stadium: ERDGAS Sportpark; Attendance: 14,000 |

| 7 January 2017 Friendly | Borussia Dortmund | 4–1 | PSV Eindhoven | La Línea de la Concepción, Spain |
| 16:00 CET (UTC+1) | Reus 19'; Kagawa 40'; Schürrle 52'; Pulisic 74' | Report | De Jong 57' | Stadium: Estadio Municipal de La Línea de la Concepción; Attendance: 5,351 |

| 12 January 2017 Friendly | Borussia Dortmund | 3–0 | Standard Liège | Marbella, Spain |
| 18:00 CET (UTC+1) | Pulisic 15'; Passlack 55'; Guerreiro 73' | Report | | Stadium: Estadio Municipal de Marbella; Attendance: 4,000 |

| 17 January 2017 Friendly | SC Paderborn | 1–6 | Borussia Dortmund | Paderborn, Germany |
| 18:30 CET (UTC+1) | Bertels 28' | Report | Castro 22'; Reus 37'; Götze 63'; Schürrle 68' (pen.), 84' (pen.); Guerreiro 81' | Stadium: Benteler Arena; Attendance: 12,099 |

| 22 January 2017 Friendly | Rot-Weiß Erfurt | Postponed | Borussia Dortmund | Erfurt, Germany |
| 14:30 CET (UTC+1) | | | | Stadium: Steigerwaldstadion |
Note: This match was scheduled for 22 January 2017. However due to heavy fog, the plane carrying Dortmund's team could not land safely in Erfurt. The match was subsequently postponed to a later date.

=== International Champions Cup ===
| Pos | Team | Pld | W | WP | LP | L | GF | GA | GD | Pts |
|---|---|---|---|---|---|---|---|---|---|---|
| 1 | (Germany) Borussia Dortmund | 2 | 1 | 0 | 1 | 0 | 5 | 2 | +3 | 4 |
| 2 | (England) Manchester City | 1 | 0 | 1 | 0 | 0 | 1 | 1 | 0 | 2 |
| 3 | (England) Manchester United | 1 | 0 | 0 | 0 | 1 | 1 | 4 | −3 | 0 |

Source: ICC
Rules for classification: 1) Points; 2) Goal difference; 3) Goals scored

| 22 July 2016 1 | Manchester United | 1–4 | Borussia Dortmund | Shanghai, China |
| 20:00 CST (UTC+8); 14:00 CEST (UTC+2) | Mkhitaryan 59' | Report | Castro 19', 86'; Aubameyang 36' (pen.); Dembélé 57' | Stadium: Shanghai Stadium; Attendance: 60,000; Referee: Wang Di (China) |

| 28 July 2016 2 | Borussia Dortmund | 1–1 (5–6 p) | Manchester City | Shenzhen, China |
| 19:30 CST (UTC+8); 13:30 CEST (UTC+2) | Pulisic 90+6' | Report | Agüero 79' | Stadium: Shenzhen Universiade Centre; Attendance: 32,008; Referee: Fu Ming (China) |
| | Penalties |
| | Passlack (penalty missed); Kagawa (penalty scored); Castro (penalty scored); Burnić (penalty scored); Pulisic (penalty scored); Hober (penalty scored); Larsen (penalty missed); Merino (penalty missed) | | (penalty missed) García; (penalty scored) Adarabioyo; (penalty scored) Fernandinho; (penalty scored) Silva; (penalty scored) Agüero; (penalty scored) Nolito; (penalty missed) Sterling; (penalty scored) Angeliño |

== Competitions ==
Win Draw Loss

=== Overview ===
| Competition | First match | Last match | Starting round | Final position | Record | | | | | | | |
| Competition | First match | Last match | Starting round | Final position | Pld | W | D | L | GF | GA | GD | Win % |
|---|---|---|---|---|---|---|---|---|---|---|---|---|
| Bundesliga | 27 August 2016 | 20 May 2017 | Matchday 1 | 3rd | 34 | 18 | 10 | 6 | 72 | 40 | +32 | 52.94 |
| DFB-Pokal | 22 August 2016 | 27 May 2017 | First round | Winners | 6 | 4 | 2 | 0 | 13 | 5 | +8 | 66.67 |
| DFL-Supercup | 14 August 2016 | | Final | Runners-up | 1 | 0 | 0 | 1 | 0 | 2 | −2 | 0.00 |
| Champions League | 14 September 2016 | 19 April 2017 | Group stage | Quarter-finals | 10 | 5 | 2 | 3 | 28 | 16 | +12 | 50.00 |
| Total | | | | | 51 | 27 | 14 | 10 | 113 | 63 | +50 | 52.94 |

Last updated: 27 May 2017
Source: Competitions

=== Bundesliga ===
==== League table ====
| Pos | Team | Pld | W | D | L | GF | GA | GD | Pts | Qualification or relegation |
|---|---|---|---|---|---|---|---|---|---|---|
| 1 | Bayern Munich (C) | 34 | 25 | 7 | 2 | 89 | 22 | +67 | 82 | Qualification for the Champions League group stage |
| 2 | RB Leipzig | 34 | 20 | 7 | 7 | 66 | 39 | +27 | 67 | Qualification for the Champions League group stage |
| 3 | Borussia Dortmund | 34 | 18 | 10 | 6 | 72 | 40 | +32 | 64 | Qualification for the Champions League group stage |
| 4 | 1899 Hoffenheim | 34 | 16 | 14 | 4 | 64 | 37 | +27 | 62 | Qualification for the Champions League play-off round |
| 5 | 1. FC Köln | 34 | 12 | 13 | 9 | 51 | 42 | +9 | 49 | Qualification for the Europa League group stage (Note: Since the winners of the 2016–17 DFB-Pokal, Borussia Dortmund, qualified for the Champions League based on league position, the Europa League group stage spot was passed to the sixth-placed team, Hertha BSC; and the Europa League third qualifying round spot was passed to the seventh-placed team, SC Freiburg.) |

Source: DFB
Rules for classification: 1) Points; 2) Goal difference; 3) Goals scored; 4) Head-to-head points; 5) Head-to-head goal difference; 6) Head-to-head away goals scored; 7) Away goals scored; 8) Play-off.
(C) Champions

==== Results summary ====
| Overall | | | | | | | | Home | | | | | | Away | | | | | |
| Pld | W | D | L | GF | GA | GD | Pts | W | D | L | GF | GA | GD | W | D | L | GF | GA | GD |
|---|---|---|---|---|---|---|---|---|---|---|---|---|---|---|---|---|---|---|---|
| 34 | 18 | 10 | 6 | 72 | 40 | +32 | 64 | 13 | 4 | 0 | 41 | 12 | +29 | 5 | 6 | 6 | 31 | 28 | +3 |

Last updated: 27 May 2017.
Source: Bundesliga

==== Results by round ====
| Round | 1 | 2 | 3 | 4 | 5 | 6 | 7 | 8 | 9 | 10 | 11 | 12 | 13 | 14 | 15 | 16 | 17 | 18 | 19 | 20 | 21 | 22 | 23 | 24 | 25 | 26 | 27 | 28 | 29 | 30 | 31 | 32 | 33 | 34 |
|---|---|---|---|---|---|---|---|---|---|---|---|---|---|---|---|---|---|---|---|---|---|---|---|---|---|---|---|---|---|---|---|---|---|---|
| Ground | H | A | H | A | H | A | H | A | H | A | H | A | H | A | A | H | A | A | H | A | H | A | H | A | H | A | H | A | H | A | H | H | A | H |
| Result | W | L | W | W | W | L | D | D | D | W | W | L | W | D | D | D | W | D | W | L | W | W | W | L | W | D | W | L | W | W | D | W | D | W |
| Position | 4 | 8 | 5 | 3 | 2 | 3 | 5 | 6 | 6 | 5 | 3 | 7 | 6 | 6 | 5 | 6 | 4 | 4 | 4 | 4 | 3 | 3 | 3 | 3 | 3 | 4 | 4 | 4 | 4 | 3 | 4 | 3 | 3 | 3 |

Updated to match(es) played on 27 May 2017. Source: Bundesliga
A = Away; H = Home; W = Win; D = Draw; L = Loss

==== Matches ====
| 27 August 2016 1 | Borussia Dortmund | 2–1 | Mainz 05 | Dortmund |
| 15:30 CEST (UTC+2) | Aubameyang 17', 89' (pen.) | Report | Brosinski (yellow card) 13'; Serdar (yellow card) 44'; Onisiwo (yellow card) 88'; Muto 90+2' | Stadium: SIGNAL IDUNA PARK; Attendance: 81,360; Referee: Robert Hartmann |

| 10 September 2016 2 | RB Leipzig | 1–0 | Borussia Dortmund | Leipzig |
| 18:30 CEST (UTC+2) | Orban (yellow card) 48'; Werner (yellow card) 54'; Keïta 89' | Report | Castro (yellow card) 40'; Bartra (yellow card) 59' | Stadium: Red Bull Arena; Attendance: 42,558; Referee: Wolfgang Stark |

| 17 September 2016 3 | Borussia Dortmund | 6–0 | Darmstadt 98 | Dortmund |
| 15:30 CEST (UTC+2) | Castro 7', 78'; Ramos 48'; Pulisic 54'; Rode 84'; Mor 88' | Report | Ben-Hatira (yellow card) 22'; Milošević (yellow card) 32'; Höhn (yellow card) 41'; Niemeyer (yellow card) 44' (yellow-red card) 57'; Jungwirth (yellow card) 50' | Stadium: SIGNAL IDUNA PARK; Attendance: 81,360; Referee: Benjamin Brand |

| 20 September 2016 4 | VfL Wolfsburg | 1–5 | Borussia Dortmund | Wolfsburg |
| 20:00 CEST (UTC+2) | Arnold (yellow card) 13'; Błaszczykowski (yellow card) 25'; Didavi 53' | Report | Guerreiro 4'; Aubameyang 16', 62'; Dembélé 58'; Piszczek 73' | Stadium: VOLKSWAGEN ARENA; Attendance: 30,000; Referee: Daniel Siebert |

| 23 September 2016 5 | Borussia Dortmund | 3–1 | SC Freiburg | Dortmund |
| 20:30 CEST (UTC+2) | Dembélé (yellow card) 38'; Aubameyang 45'; Piszczek 53'; Papastathopoulos (yellow card) 70'; Guerreiro 90+1' | Report | Philipp 60'; Günter (yellow card) 62'; Höfler (yellow card) 65'; Söyüncü (yellow card) 76' | Stadium: SIGNAL IDUNA PARK; Attendance: 80,800; Referee: Christian Dingert |

| 1 October 2016 6 | Bayer Leverkusen | 2–0 | Borussia Dortmund | Leverkusen |
| 18:30 CEST (UTC+2) | Mehmedi 10'; Aránguiz (yellow card) 14'; Kampl (yellow card) 37'; Hernández (yellow card) 40', (goal) 79'; Toprak (yellow card) 62'; Çalhanoğlu (yellow card) 88' | Report | Ginter (yellow card) 74' | Stadium: BayArena; Attendance: 30,210; Referee: Manuel Gräfe |

| 14 October 2016 7 | Borussia Dortmund | 1–1 | Hertha BSC | Dortmund |
| 20:30 CEST (UTC+2) | Dembélé (yellow card) 64'; Aubameyang 80'; Mor (red card) 84' | Report | Stark (yellow card) 19'; Stocker 51', (red card) 90'; Brooks (yellow card) 53'; Esswein (yellow card) 64'; Langkamp (yellow card) 84'; Allagui (yellow card) 88' | Stadium: SIGNAL IDUNA PARK; Attendance: 80,800; Referee: Patrick Ittrich |

| 22 October 2016 8 | FC Ingolstadt | 3–3 | Borussia Dortmund | Ingolstadt |
| 15:30 CEST (UTC+2) | Cohen 6'; Lezcano 24', 60' | Report | Aubameyang 59'; Ramos 69', (yellow card) 71'; Pulisic 90+1' | Stadium: Audi Sportpark; Attendance: 15,200; Referee: Felix Zwayer |

| 29 October 2016 9 | Borussia Dortmund | 0–0 | Schalke 04 | Dortmund |
| 18:30 CEST (UTC+2) | Kagawa (yellow card) 7'; Weigl (yellow card) 12'; Dembélé (yellow card) 41'; Papastathopoulos (yellow card) 64' | Report | Nastasić (yellow card) 34'; Bentaleb (yellow card) 36'; Kolašinac (yellow card) 76'; Goretzka (yellow card) 90' | Stadium: SIGNAL IDUNA PARK; Attendance: 80,179; Referee: Felix Brych |

| 5 November 2016 10 | Hamburger SV | 2–5 | Borussia Dortmund | Hamburg |
| 15:30 CET (UTC+1) | Müller 55', 81'; Sakai (yellow card) 68'; Douglas Santos (yellow card) 85' | Report | Aubameyang 4', 23', 27', 48'; Dembélé 76' | Stadium: Volksparkstadion; Attendance: 57,000; Referee: Sascha Stegemann |

| 19 November 2016 11 | Borussia Dortmund | 1–0 | Bayern Munich | Dortmund |
| 18:30 CET (UTC+1) | Aubameyang 11'; Bartra (yellow card) 19'; Götze (yellow card) 50'; Ramos (yellow card) 88' | Report | Ribéry (yellow card) 88'; Sanches (yellow card) 90+1' | Stadium: SIGNAL IDUNA PARK; Attendance: 81,360; Referee: Tobias Stieler |

| 26 November 2016 12 | Eintracht Frankfurt | 2–1 | Borussia Dortmund | Frankfurt |
| 15:30 CET (UTC+1) | Hector (yellow card) 34'; Fabián (yellow card) 45+4'; Huszti 46'; Seferovic 79'; Gaćinović (yellow card) 90'; Hrádecký (yellow card) 90+1' | Report | Papastathopoulos (yellow card) 65'; Castro (yellow card) 74'; Aubameyang 77'; Schmelzer (yellow card) 90+5' | Stadium: Commerzbank-Arena; Attendance: 51,500; Referee: Wolfgang Stark |

| 3 December 2016 13 | Borussia Dortmund | 4–1 | Borussia Mönchengladbach | Dortmund |
| 15:30 CET (UTC+1) | Aubameyang 7', 68'; Piszczek 15', (yellow card) 36'; Dembélé 64' | Report | Raffael 6'; Strobl (yellow card) 14' | Stadium: SIGNAL IDUNA PARK; Attendance: 81,360; Referee: Marco Fritz |

| 10 December 2016 14 | 1. FC Köln | 1–1 | Borussia Dortmund | Cologne |
| 15:30 CET (UTC+1) | Rudņevs 28'; Heintz (yellow card) 53'; Özcan (yellow card) 65' (yellow-red card) 90+4'; Höger (yellow card) 72' | Report | Schmelzer (yellow card) 28'; Dembélé (yellow card) 45+1'; Papastathopoulos (yellow card) 60'; Reus 90' | Stadium: RheinEnergieSTADION; Attendance: 50,000; Referee: Felix Zwayer |

| 16 December 2016 15 | 1899 Hoffenheim | 2–2 | Borussia Dortmund | Sinsheim |
| 20:30 CET (UTC+1) | Uth 3'; Wagner 20'; Süle (yellow card) 30'; Hübner (yellow card) 39'; Demirbay (yellow card) 58'; Rudy (yellow card) 86'; Vogt (yellow card) 86' | Report | Reus (yellow card) 9' (yellow-red card) 41'; Götze 11'; Bartra (yellow card) 27'; Aubameyang 48' | Stadium: WIRSOL Rhein-Neckar-Arena; Attendance: 30,150; Referee: Benjamin Brand |

| 20 December 2016 16 | Borussia Dortmund | 1–1 | FC Augsburg | Dortmund |
| 20:00 CET (UTC+1) | Dembélé 47'; Kagawa (yellow card) 69' | Report | Ji 33'; Baier (yellow card) 52'; Stafylidis (yellow card) 65' | Stadium: SIGNAL IDUNA PARK; Attendance: 81,360; Referee: Guido Winkmann |

| 21 January 2017 17 | Werder Bremen | 1–2 | Borussia Dortmund | Bremen |
| 15:30 CET (UTC+1) | Bauer (yellow card) 19'; Drobný (red card) 39'; Bartels 59'; Delaney (yellow card) 76'; S. García (yellow card) 84' | Report | Schürrle 5', (yellow card) 43'; Piszczek 71' | Stadium: Weser-Stadion; Attendance: 42,100; Referee: Daniel Siebert |

| 29 January 2017 18 | Mainz 05 | 1–1 | Borussia Dortmund | Mainz |
| 17:30 CET (UTC+1) | Gbamin (yellow card) 54'; Jairo (yellow card) 75'; Latza 83' | Report | Reus 3'; Schürrle (yellow card) 75' | Stadium: OPEL ARENA; Attendance: 34,000; Referee: Felix Zwayer |

| 4 February 2017 19 | Borussia Dortmund | 1–0 | RB Leipzig | Dortmund |
| 18:30 CET (UTC+1) | Aubameyang 35', (yellow card) 90+4' | Report | Bernardo (yellow card) 22'; Upamecano (yellow card) 72'; Compper (yellow card) 81' | Stadium: SIGNAL IDUNA PARK; Attendance: 81,360; Referee: Tobias Stieler |

| 11 February 2017 20 | Darmstadt 98 | 2–1 | Borussia Dortmund | Darmstadt |
| 15:30 CET (UTC+1) | Boyd 21'; Čolak 67'; Esser (yellow card) 75'; Sulu (yellow card) 77' | Report | Guerreiro 44'; Aubameyang (yellow card) 73'; Burnić (yellow card) 79' | Stadium: Jonathan-Heimes-Stadion am Böllenfalltor; Attendance: 17,400; Referee: Wolfgang Stark |

| 18 February 2017 21 | Borussia Dortmund | 3–0 | VfL Wolfsburg | Dortmund |
| 15:30 CET (UTC+1) | Bruma 20' (o.g.); Piszczek 48'; Weigl (yellow card) 53'; Dembélé 59'; Schürrle (yellow card) 89' | Report | Bruma (yellow card) 89' | Stadium: SIGNAL IDUNA PARK; Attendance: 56,906; Referee: Günter Perl |

| 25 February 2017 22 | SC Freiburg | 0–3 | Borussia Dortmund | Freiburg im Breisgau |
| 15:30 CET (UTC+1) | Philipp (yellow card) 67' | Report | Papastathopoulos 13'; Aubameyang 55', 70' | Stadium: Schwarzwald-Stadion; Attendance: 24,000; Referee: Daniel Siebert |

| 4 March 2017 23 | Borussia Dortmund | 6–2 | Bayer Leverkusen | Dortmund |
| 15:30 CET (UTC+1) | Dembélé 6'; Aubameyang 26', 69'; Pulisic 77'; Schürrle 85' (pen.); Guerreiro 90+2' | Report | Aránguiz (yellow card) 16'; Havertz (yellow card) 37'; Bellarabi (yellow card) 45+3'; Volland 48', (yellow card) 63'; Bender (yellow card) 69'; Wendell 74', (yellow card) 84' | Stadium: SIGNAL IDUNA PARK; Attendance: 79,100; Referee: Christian Dingert |

| 11 March 2017 24 | Hertha BSC | 2–1 | Borussia Dortmund | Berlin |
| 15:30 CET (UTC+1) | Kalou 11'; Langkamp (yellow card) 61'; Plattenhardt 71'; Weiser (yellow card) 90' | Report | Aubameyang 55'; Ginter (yellow card) 70'; Bartra (yellow card) 80'; Dembélé (yellow card) 90'; Pulisic (yellow card) 90+3' | Stadium: Olympiastadion Berlin; Attendance: 74,667; Referee: Robert Hartmann |

| 17 March 2017 25 | Borussia Dortmund | 1–0 | FC Ingolstadt | Dortmund |
| 20:30 CET (UTC+1) | Aubameyang 14'; Schmelzer (yellow card) 90' | Report | Lezcano (yellow card) 35'; Hadergjonaj (yellow card) 54'; Suttner (yellow card) 81' | Stadium: SIGNAL IDUNA PARK; Attendance: 81,360; Referee: Daniel Siebert |

| 1 April 2017 26 | Schalke 04 | 1–1 | Borussia Dortmund | Gelsenkirchen |
| 15:30 CEST (UTC+2) | Kehrer 77'; Bentaleb (yellow card) 90+1' | Report | Aubameyang 53', (yellow card) 54'; Papastathopoulos (yellow card) 90+1' | Stadium: VELTINS-Arena; Attendance: 62,271; Referee: Felix Zwayer |

| 4 April 2017 27 | Borussia Dortmund | 3–0 | Hamburger SV | Dortmund |
| 20:00 CEST (UTC+2) | Castro 13'; Ginter (yellow card) 29'; Kagawa 81'; Aubameyang 90+2' | Report | Ekdal (yellow card) 12'; Kostić (yellow card) 66'; Holtby (yellow card) 80' | Stadium: SIGNAL IDUNA PARK; Attendance: 81,360; Referee: Markus Schmidt |

| 8 April 2017 28 | Bayern Munich | 4–1 | Borussia Dortmund | Munich |
| 18:30 CEST (UTC+2) | Ribéry 4'; Lewandowski 10', 68' (pen.), (yellow card) 24'; Robben 49'; Vidal (yellow card) 63' | Report | Guerreiro 20'; Passlack (yellow card) 36'; Bartra (yellow card) 45+1'; Bürki (yellow card) 68' | Stadium: Allianz Arena; Attendance: 75,000; Referee: Marco Fritz |

| 15 April 2017 29 | Borussia Dortmund | 3–1 | Eintracht Frankfurt | Dortmund |
| 15:30 CEST (UTC+2) | Reus 2'; Papastathopoulos 34'; Aubameyang 86' | Report | Fabián 29' | Stadium: SIGNAL IDUNA PARK; Attendance: 81,360; Referee: Robert Hartmann |

| 22 April 2017 30 | Borussia Mönchengladbach | 2–3 | Borussia Dortmund | Mönchengladbach |
| 18:30 CEST (UTC+2) | Dahoud (yellow card) 9'; Stindl 43'; Schmelzer 48' (o.g.); Elvedi (yellow card) 71' | Report | Reus 10' (pen.); Castro (yellow card) 54'; Aubameyang 59'; Merino (yellow card) 79'; Guerreiro 87'; Bürki (yellow card) 90+3' | Stadium: BORUSSIA-PARK; Attendance: 54,014; Referee: Wolfgang Stark |

| 29 April 2017 31 | Borussia Dortmund | 0–0 | 1. FC Köln | Dortmund |
| 15:30 CEST (UTC+2) | Durm (yellow card) 9'; Castro (yellow card) 84' | Report | Bittencourt (yellow card) 39'; Klünter (yellow card) 90' | Stadium: SIGNAL IDUNA PARK; Attendance: 81,360; Referee: Tobias Stieler |

| 6 May 2017 32 | Borussia Dortmund | 2–1 | 1899 Hoffenheim | Dortmund |
| 15:30 CEST (UTC+2) | Reus 4', (yellow card) 11'; Castro (yellow card) 45+1'; Papastathopoulos (yellow card) 53'; Dembélé (yellow card) 57'; Aubameyang 82' | Report | Uth (yellow card) 15'; Demirbay (yellow card) 59'; Kramarić 86' (pen.) | Stadium: SIGNAL IDUNA PARK; Attendance: 81,360; Referee: Felix Brych |

| 13 May 2017 33 | FC Augsburg | 1–1 | Borussia Dortmund | Augsburg |
| 15:30 CEST (UTC+2) | Finnbogason 28'; Stafylidis (yellow card) 59'; Kohr (yellow card) 90+1' | Report | Ginter (yellow card) 13'; Aubameyang 32' | Stadium: WWK ARENA; Attendance: 30,660; Referee: Sascha Stegemann |

| 20 May 2017 34 | Borussia Dortmund | 4–3 | Werder Bremen | Dortmund |
| 15:30 CEST (UTC+2) | Papastathopoulos (yellow card) 11'; Reus 32', 75' (pen.); Aubameyang 42', 89' (pen.); Dembélé (yellow card) 61'; Şahin (yellow card) 62'; Kagawa (yellow card) 87' | Report | Junuzović 7'; Bartels 46', (yellow card) 58'; Kruse 68'; Bargfrede (yellow card) 88'; Veljković (yellow card) 90+2' | Stadium: SIGNAL IDUNA PARK; Attendance: 81,360; Referee: Günter Perl |

=== DFB-Pokal ===
| 22 August 2016 First round | Eintracht Trier | 0–3 | Borussia Dortmund | Trier |
| 20:45 CEST (UTC+2) | Riedel (yellow card) 18'; Dingels (yellow card) 76' | Report | Kagawa 8', 33'; Schürrle (yellow card) 21', (goal) 45'; Rode (yellow card) 41' | Stadium: Moselstadion; Attendance: 10,805; Referee: Manuel Gräfe |

| 26 October 2016 Second round | Borussia Dortmund | 1–1 (a.e.t.) (3–0 p) | Union Berlin | Dortmund |
| 20:45 CEST (UTC+2) | Parensen 44' (o.g.) | Report | Parensen (yellow card) 55'; Punčec (yellow card) 77'; Skrzybski 81'; Fürstner (yellow card) 91'; Trimmel (yellow card) 98' | Stadium: SIGNAL IDUNA PARK; Attendance: 79,037; Referee: Jochen Drees |
| | Penalties |
| | Dembélé (penalty scored); Ginter (penalty scored); Götze (penalty scored) | | (penalty missed) Kroos; (penalty missed) Fürstner; (penalty missed) Hosiner |
Note: The match was originally scheduled to start at 20:45, but was delayed 15 minutes due to a traffic jam around the stadium.

| 8 February 2017 Round of 16 | Borussia Dortmund | 1–1 (a.e.t.) (3–2 p) | Hertha BSC | Dortmund |
| 20:45 CET (UTC+1) | Weigl (yellow card) 33'; Reus 47'; Bartra (yellow card) 78'; Castro (yellow card) 108'; Papastathopoulos (yellow card) 119' (yellow-red card) 119' | Report | Brooks (yellow card) 13'; Kalou 27'; Pekarík (yellow card) 31'; Skjelbred (yellow card) 34'; Stark (yellow card) 39'; Darida (yellow card) 52'; Mittelstädt (yellow card) 62' | Stadium: SIGNAL IDUNA PARK; Attendance: 80,500; Referee: Deniz Aytekin |
| | Penalties |
| | Dembélé (penalty scored); Pulisic (penalty missed); Aubameyang (penalty scored); Castro (penalty scored) | | (penalty missed) Lustenberger; (penalty missed) Darida; (penalty scored) Esswein; (penalty scored) Allagui; (penalty missed) Kalou |

| 14 March 2017 Quarter-finals | Sportfreunde Lotte | 0–3 | Borussia Dortmund | Osnabrück |
| 18:30 CET (UTC+1) | Langlitz (yellow card) 45'; Pires-Rodrigues (yellow card) 90' | Report | Guerreiro (yellow card) 8'; Castro (yellow card) 39'; Pulisic 57'; Schürrle 66'; Schmelzer 83' | Stadium: Stadion an der Bremer Brücke; Attendance: 15,780; Referee: Felix Brych |
Note: The match, originally scheduled for 28 February 2017, 20:45, was cancelled due to poor pitch conditions, and was rescheduled for two weeks later. The match was originally scheduled to take place at Sportfreunde Lotte's home stadium, the FRIMO Stadion in Lotte. However, due to the cancellation of the original match due to poor pitch conditions, the match was rescheduled to take place at the Stadion an der Bremer Brücke in Osnabrück.

| 26 April 2017 Semi-finals | Bayern Munich | 2–3 | Borussia Dortmund | Munich |
| 20:45 CEST (UTC+2) | Martínez 28'; Robben (yellow card) 31'; Hummels 41'; Alonso (yellow card) 78' | Report | Weigl (yellow card) 14'; Reus 19'; Dembélé (yellow card) 25', (goal) 74'; Aubameyang 69'; Bürki (yellow card) 90+4' | Stadium: Allianz Arena; Attendance: 75,000; Referee: Manuel Gräfe |

| 27 May 2017 Final | Eintracht Frankfurt | 1–2 | Borussia Dortmund | Berlin |
| 20:00 CEST (UTC+2) | Rebić 29', (yellow card) 87'; Gaćinović (yellow card) 38'; Hrádecký (yellow card) 66'; Abraham (yellow card) 69' | Report | Dembélé 8', (yellow card) 90+4'; Aubameyang 67' (pen.) | Stadium: Olympiastadion Berlin; Attendance: 74,322; Referee: Deniz Aytekin |

=== DFL-Supercup ===
| 14 August 2016 Final | Borussia Dortmund | 0–2 | Bayern Munich | Dortmund |
| 20:30 CEST (UTC+2) | Passlack (yellow card) 29'; Dembélé (yellow card) 39'; Rode (yellow card) 61' | Report | Martínez (yellow card) 10'; Alonso (yellow card) 29'; Ribéry (yellow card) 29'; Vidal 58'; Müller 79' | Stadium: SIGNAL IDUNA PARK; Attendance: 81,360; Referee: Tobias Welz |

=== UEFA Champions League ===
==== Group stage ====
| Pos | Team | Pld | W | D | L | GF | GA | GD | Pts | Qualification | DOR | RMA | LEG | SPO |
|---|---|---|---|---|---|---|---|---|---|---|---|---|---|---|
| 1 | (Germany) Borussia Dortmund | 6 | 4 | 2 | 0 | 21 | 9 | +12 | 14 | Advance to knockout phase | — | 2–2 | 8–4 | 1–0 |
| 2 | (Spain) Real Madrid | 6 | 3 | 3 | 0 | 16 | 10 | +6 | 12 | Advance to knockout phase | 2–2 | — | 5–1 | 2–1 |
| 3 | (Poland) Legia Warsaw | 6 | 1 | 1 | 4 | 9 | 24 | −15 | 4 | Transfer to Europa League | 0–6 | 3–3 | — | 1–0 |
| 4 | (Portugal) Sporting CP | 6 | 1 | 0 | 5 | 5 | 8 | −3 | 3 | | 1–2 | 1–2 | 2–0 | — |

Source: UEFA
Rules for classification: Group stage tiebreakers

| 14 September 2016 1 | Legia Warsaw (Poland) | 0–6 | (Germany) Borussia Dortmund | Warsaw, Poland |
| 20:45 CEST (UTC+2) | Malarz (yellow card) 16'; Guilherme (yellow card) 30'; Bereszyński (yellow card) 61' | Report | Götze 7', (yellow card) 74'; Papastathopoulos 15'; Bartra 17'; Guerreiro 51'; Castro 76'; Aubameyang 87' | Stadium: Polish Army Stadium; Attendance: 27,304; Referee: Sergei Karasev (Russia) |

| 27 September 2016 2 | Borussia Dortmund (Germany) | 2–2 | (Spain) Real Madrid | Dortmund, Germany |
| 20:45 CEST (UTC+2) | Aubameyang 43', (yellow card) 90+3'; Schmelzer (yellow card) 50'; Weigl (yellow card) 74'; Guerreiro (yellow card) 77'; Schürrle 87' | Report | Ronaldo 17'; Ramos (yellow card) 63'; Varane 68' | Stadium: Westfalenstadion; Attendance: 65,849; Referee: Mark Clattenburg (England) |

| 18 October 2016 3 | Sporting CP (Portugal) | 1–2 | (Germany) Borussia Dortmund | Lisbon, Portugal |
| 19:45 WEST (UTC+1); 20:45 CEST (UTC+2) | Elias (yellow card) 54'; Bruno César 67', (yellow card) 86'; Schelotto (yellow card) 68'; Campbell (yellow card) 76' | Report | Aubameyang 9'; Weigl 43'; Passlack (yellow card) 48'; Rode (yellow card) 76'; Bürki (yellow card) 88' | Stadium: Estádio José Alvalade; Attendance: 46,609; Referee: Damir Skomina (Slovenia) |

| 2 November 2016 4 | Borussia Dortmund (Germany) | 1–0 | (Portugal) Sporting CP | Dortmund, Germany |
| 20:45 CET (UTC+1) | Ramos 12'; Guerreiro (yellow card) 65' | Report | Semedo (yellow card) 11'; Castaignos (yellow card) 20'; Zeegelaar (yellow card) 75' | Stadium: Westfalenstadion; Attendance: 65,849; Referee: Danny Makkelie (Netherlands) |

| 22 November 2016 5 | Borussia Dortmund (Germany) | 8–4 | (Poland) Legia Warsaw | Dortmund, Germany |
| 20:45 CET (UTC+1) | Kagawa 17', 18'; Şahin 20'; Dembélé 29'; Reus 32', 52'; Passlack 81'; Ginter (yellow card) 88'; Rzeźniczak 90+2' (o.g.) | Report | Prijović 10', 24'; Kucharczyk 57'; Odjidja-Ofoe (yellow card) 61'; Pazdan (yellow card) 63'; Nikolić 83' | Stadium: Westfalenstadion; Attendance: 55,094; Referee: Martin Strömbergsson (Sweden) |

| 7 December 2016 6 | Real Madrid (Spain) | 2–2 | (Germany) Borussia Dortmund | Madrid, Spain |
| 20:45 CET (UTC+1) | Benzema 28', 53'; Modrić (yellow card) 39'; Casemiro (yellow card) 69' | Report | Aubameyang 60'; Papastathopoulos (yellow card) 71'; Reus 88' | Stadium: Santiago Bernabéu; Attendance: 76,894; Referee: Szymon Marciniak (Poland) |

==== Knockout phase ====
===== Round of 16 =====
| 14 February 2017 First leg | Benfica (Portugal) | 1–0 | (Germany) Borussia Dortmund | Lisbon, Portugal |
| 19:45 WET (UTC); 20:45 CET (UTC+1) | Mitroglou 48'; Fejsa (yellow card) 63' | Report | Schmelzer (yellow card) 74'; Pulisic (yellow card) 85'; Bartra (yellow card) 90' | Stadium: Estádio da Luz; Attendance: 55,124; Referee: Nicola Rizzoli (Italy) |

| 8 March 2017 Second leg | Borussia Dortmund (Germany) | 4–0 (4–1 agg.) | (Portugal) Benfica | Dortmund, Germany |
| 20:45 CET (UTC+1) | Aubameyang 4', 61', 85'; Castro (yellow card) 31'; Dembélé (yellow card) 38'; Pulisic 59'; Piszczek (yellow card) 65' | Report | Samaris (yellow card) 33' | Stadium: Westfalenstadion; Attendance: 65,849; Referee: Martin Atkinson (England) |

===== Quarter-finals =====
| 12 April 2017 First leg | Borussia Dortmund (Germany) | 2–3 | (France) Monaco | Dortmund, Germany |
| 18:45 CEST (UTC+2) | Papastathopoulos (yellow card) 16'; Ginter (yellow card) 40'; Dembélé 57'; Kagawa 84' | Report | Mbappé 19', 79'; Bender 35' (o.g.); Jemerson (yellow card) 46'; Lemar (yellow card) 58'; Dirar (yellow card) 69'; Fabinho (yellow card) 81'; Subašić (yellow card) 87' | Stadium: Westfalenstadion; Attendance: 65,849; Referee: Daniele Orsato (Italy) |
Note: The match, originally scheduled on 11 April 2017, 20:45 CEST, was postponed to the following day due to explosions close to the Borussia Dortmund team bus.

| 19 April 2017 Second leg | Monaco (France) | 3–1 (6–3 agg.) | (Germany) Borussia Dortmund | Fontvieille, Monaco |
| 20:50 CEST (UTC+2) | Mbappé 3'; Falcao 17'; Germain 81' | Report | Reus 48' | Stadium: Stade Louis II; Attendance: 17,135; Referee: Damir Skomina (Slovenia) |
Note: The match, originally scheduled for 20:45 CEST, was delayed to 20:50 CEST due to late team arrival caused by heavy traffic.

== Statistics ==
=== Appearances and goals ===
| No. | Pos | Nat | Player | Total | | Bundesliga | | DFB-Pokal | | Champions League | | DFL-Supercup | |
| No. | Pos | Nat | Player | Apps | Goals | Apps | Goals | Apps | Goals | Apps | Goals | Apps | Goals |
Goalkeepers
| 1 | GK | (Germany) GER | Roman Weidenfeller | 11 | 0 | 7 | 0 | 2 | 0 | 2 | 0 | 0 | 0 |
| 38 | GK | (Switzerland) SUI | Roman Bürki | 40 | 0 | 27 | 0 | 4 | 0 | 8 | 0 | 1 | 0 |
| 39 | GK | (Germany) GER | Hendrik Bonmann | 0 | 0 | 0 | 0 | 0 | 0 | 0 | 0 | 0 | 0 |
Defenders
| 3 | DF | (South Korea) KOR | Park Joo-ho | 2 | 0 | 1+1 | 0 | 0 | 0 | 0 | 0 | 0 | 0 |
| 5 | DF | (Spain) ESP | Marc Bartra | 31 | 1 | 18+1 | 0 | 4 | 0 | 7 | 1 | 1 | 0 |
| 13 | DF | (Portugal) POR | Raphaël Guerreiro | 35 | 7 | 17+7 | 6 | 4+1 | 0 | 6 | 1 | 0 | 0 |
| 25 | DF | (Greece) GRE | Sokratis Papastathopoulos | 41 | 3 | 26 | 2 | 5 | 0 | 9 | 1 | 1 | 0 |
| 26 | DF | (Poland) POL | Łukasz Piszczek | 39 | 5 | 23+2 | 5 | 5 | 0 | 7+2 | 0 | 0 | 0 |
| 28 | DF | (Germany) GER | Matthias Ginter | 42 | 0 | 26+3 | 0 | 3+2 | 0 | 6+2 | 0 | 0 | 0 |
| 29 | DF | (Germany) GER | Marcel Schmelzer | 39 | 1 | 25+1 | 0 | 5 | 1 | 6+1 | 0 | 1 | 0 |
| 37 | DF | (Germany) GER | Erik Durm | 20 | 0 | 10+3 | 0 | 1+2 | 0 | 3+1 | 0 | 0 | 0 |
Midfielders
| 6 | MF | (Germany) GER | Sven Bender | 8 | 0 | 3+3 | 0 | 1 | 0 | 1 | 0 | 0 | 0 |
| 8 | MF | (Turkey) TUR | Nuri Şahin | 9 | 1 | 4+1 | 0 | 1 | 0 | 2+1 | 1 | 0 | 0 |
| 9 | MF | (Turkey) TUR | Emre Mor | 19 | 1 | 5+7 | 1 | 1+2 | 0 | 0+3 | 0 | 0+1 | 0 |
| 10 | MF | (Germany) GER | Mario Götze | 16 | 2 | 9+2 | 1 | 1 | 0 | 4 | 1 | 0 | 0 |
| 18 | MF | (Germany) GER | Sebastian Rode | 21 | 1 | 5+9 | 1 | 1+1 | 0 | 1+3 | 0 | 1 | 0 |
| 22 | MF | (United States) USA | Christian Pulisic | 43 | 5 | 15+14 | 3 | 1+3 | 1 | 6+4 | 1 | 0 | 0 |
| 23 | MF | (Japan) JPN | Shinji Kagawa | 30 | 6 | 13+8 | 1 | 3 | 2 | 4+1 | 3 | 1 | 0 |
| 24 | MF | (Spain) ESP | Mikel Merino | 9 | 0 | 2+6 | 0 | 0+1 | 0 | 0 | 0 | 0 | 0 |
| 27 | MF | (Germany) GER | Gonzalo Castro | 42 | 4 | 23+5 | 3 | 4+2 | 0 | 5+2 | 1 | 1 | 0 |
| 30 | MF | (Germany) GER | Felix Passlack | 15 | 1 | 6+4 | 0 | 2 | 0 | 2 | 1 | 1 | 0 |
| 32 | MF | (Germany) GER | Dženis Burnić | 2 | 0 | 1 | 0 | 0 | 0 | 0+1 | 0 | 0 | 0 |
| 33 | MF | (Germany) GER | Julian Weigl | 43 | 1 | 27+3 | 0 | 2+1 | 0 | 9 | 1 | 0+1 | 0 |
| 34 | MF | (Denmark) DEN | Jacob Bruun Larsen | 1 | 0 | 0 | 0 | 1 | 0 | 0 | 0 | 0 | 0 |
Forwards
| 7 | FW | (France) FRA | Ousmane Dembélé | 49 | 10 | 22+10 | 6 | 5+1 | 2 | 9+1 | 2 | 1 | 0 |
| 11 | FW | (Germany) GER | Marco Reus | 24 | 14 | 16+1 | 7 | 3 | 2 | 3+1 | 5 | 0 | 0 |
| 14 | FW | (Sweden) SWE | Alexander Isak | 1 | 0 | 0 | 0 | 0+1 | 0 | 0 | 0 | 0 | 0 |
| 17 | FW | (Gabon) GAB | Pierre-Emerick Aubameyang | 46 | 40 | 31+1 | 31 | 4 | 2 | 8+1 | 7 | 1 | 0 |
| 21 | FW | (Germany) GER | André Schürrle | 25 | 5 | 8+7 | 2 | 2+1 | 2 | 1+5 | 1 | 0+1 | 0 |
Players transferred out during the season
| 4 | DF | (Serbia) SRB | Neven Subotić | 0 | 0 | 0 | 0 | 0 | 0 | 0 | 0 | 0 | 0 |
| 20 | FW | (Colombia) COL | Adrián Ramos | 11 | 3 | 4+3 | 2 | 1+1 | 0 | 1 | 1 | 1 | 0 |

Last updated: 27 May 2017
Source: Competitions

=== Goalscorers ===
| Rank | No. | Pos | Nat | Name | Bundesliga | DFB-Pokal | UEFA CL | DFL-Supercup | Total |
|---|---|---|---|---|---|---|---|---|---|
| 1 | 17 | FW | (Gabon) | Pierre-Emerick Aubameyang | 31 | 2 | 7 | 0 | 40 |
| 2 | 11 | FW | (Germany) | Marco Reus | 7 | 2 | 5 | 0 | 14 |
| 3 | 7 | FW | (France) | Ousmane Dembélé | 6 | 2 | 2 | 0 | 10 |
| 4 | 13 | DF | (Portugal) | Raphaël Guerreiro | 6 | 0 | 1 | 0 | 7 |
| 5 | 23 | MF | (Japan) | Shinji Kagawa | 1 | 2 | 3 | 0 | 6 |
| 6 | 21 | FW | (Germany) | André Schürrle | 2 | 2 | 1 | 0 | 5 |
| 6 | 22 | MF | (United States) | Christian Pulisic | 3 | 1 | 1 | 0 | 5 |
| 6 | 26 | DF | (Poland) | Łukasz Piszczek | 5 | 0 | 0 | 0 | 5 |
| 9 | 27 | MF | (Germany) | Gonzalo Castro | 3 | 0 | 1 | 0 | 4 |
| 10 | 20 | FW | (Colombia) | Adrián Ramos | 2 | 0 | 1 | 0 | 3 |
| 10 | 25 | DF | (Greece) | Sokratis Papastathopoulos | 2 | 0 | 1 | 0 | 3 |
| 12 | 10 | MF | (Germany) | Mario Götze | 1 | 0 | 1 | 0 | 2 |
| 13 | 5 | DF | (Spain) | Marc Bartra | 0 | 0 | 1 | 0 | 1 |
| 13 | 8 | MF | (Turkey) | Nuri Şahin | 0 | 0 | 1 | 0 | 1 |
| 13 | 9 | MF | (Turkey) | Emre Mor | 1 | 0 | 0 | 0 | 1 |
| 13 | 18 | MF | (Germany) | Sebastian Rode | 1 | 0 | 0 | 0 | 1 |
| 13 | 29 | DF | (Germany) | Marcel Schmelzer | 0 | 1 | 0 | 0 | 1 |
| 13 | 30 | MF | (Germany) | Felix Passlack | 0 | 0 | 1 | 0 | 1 |
| 13 | 33 | MF | (Germany) | Julian Weigl | 0 | 0 | 1 | 0 | 1 |
| Own goal | | | | | 1 | 1 | 0 | 0 | 2 |
| Totals | | | | | 72 | 13 | 28 | 0 | 113 |

Last updated: 27 May 2017

=== Clean sheets ===
| Rank | No. | Pos | Nat | Name | Bundesliga | DFB-Pokal | UEFA CL | DFL-Supercup | Total |
|---|---|---|---|---|---|---|---|---|---|
| 1 | 38 | GK | (Switzerland) | Roman Bürki | 9 | 1 | 3 | 0 | 13 |
| 2 | 1 | GK | (Germany) | Roman Weidenfeller | 0 | 1 | 0 | 0 | 1 |
| Totals | | | | | 9 | 2 | 3 | 0 | 14 |

Last updated: 29 April 2017

=== Disciplinary record ===
| No. | Pos | Nat | Player | Bundesliga | | | DFB-Pokal | | | UEFA CL | | | DFL-Supercup | | | Total | | |
| No. | Pos | Nat | Player | Booked | (yellow card) (yellow-red card) | Sent off (straight red) | Booked | (yellow card) (yellow-red card) | Sent off (straight red) | Booked | (yellow card) (yellow-red card) | Sent off (straight red) | Booked | (yellow card) (yellow-red card) | Sent off (straight red) | Booked | (yellow card) (yellow-red card) | Sent off (straight red) |
| 5 | DF | (Spain) | Marc Bartra | 5 | 0 | 0 | 1 | 0 | 0 | 1 | 0 | 0 | 0 | 0 | 0 | 7 | 0 | 0 |
| 7 | FW | (France) | Ousmane Dembélé | 7 | 0 | 0 | 2 | 0 | 0 | 1 | 0 | 0 | 1 | 0 | 0 | 11 | 0 | 0 |
| 8 | MF | (Turkey) | Nuri Şahin | 1 | 0 | 0 | 0 | 0 | 0 | 0 | 0 | 0 | 0 | 0 | 0 | 0 | 0 | 0 |
| 9 | MF | (Turkey) | Emre Mor | 0 | 0 | 1 | 0 | 0 | 0 | 1 | 0 | 0 | 0 | 0 | 0 | 1 | 0 | 1 |
| 10 | MF | (Germany) | Mario Götze | 1 | 0 | 0 | 0 | 0 | 0 | 1 | 0 | 0 | 0 | 0 | 0 | 2 | 0 | 0 |
| 11 | FW | (Germany) | Marco Reus | 1 | 1 | 0 | 0 | 0 | 0 | 0 | 0 | 0 | 0 | 0 | 0 | 1 | 1 | 0 |
| 13 | DF | (Portugal) | Raphaël Guerreiro | 0 | 0 | 0 | 1 | 0 | 0 | 1 | 0 | 0 | 0 | 0 | 0 | 2 | 0 | 0 |
| 17 | FW | (Gabon) | Pierre-Emerick Aubameyang | 3 | 0 | 0 | 0 | 0 | 0 | 1 | 0 | 0 | 0 | 0 | 0 | 4 | 0 | 0 |
| 18 | MF | (Germany) | Sebastian Rode | 0 | 0 | 0 | 1 | 0 | 0 | 1 | 0 | 0 | 1 | 0 | 0 | 3 | 0 | 0 |
| 20 | FW | (Colombia) | Adrián Ramos | 2 | 0 | 0 | 0 | 0 | 0 | 0 | 0 | 0 | 0 | 0 | 0 | 2 | 0 | 0 |
| 21 | FW | (Germany) | André Schürrle | 3 | 0 | 0 | 1 | 0 | 0 | 0 | 0 | 0 | 0 | 0 | 0 | 4 | 0 | 0 |
| 22 | MF | (United States) | Christian Pulisic | 1 | 0 | 0 | 0 | 0 | 0 | 1 | 0 | 0 | 0 | 0 | 0 | 2 | 0 | 0 |
| 23 | MF | (Japan) | Shinji Kagawa | 3 | 0 | 0 | 0 | 0 | 0 | 0 | 0 | 0 | 0 | 0 | 0 | 3 | 0 | 0 |
| 24 | MF | (Spain) | Mikel Merino | 1 | 0 | 0 | 0 | 0 | 0 | 0 | 0 | 0 | 0 | 0 | 0 | 1 | 0 | 0 |
| 25 | DF | (Greece) | Sokratis Papastathopoulos | 7 | 0 | 0 | 0 | 1 | 0 | 2 | 0 | 0 | 0 | 0 | 0 | 9 | 1 | 0 |
| 26 | DF | (Poland) | Łukasz Piszczek | 0 | 0 | 0 | 0 | 0 | 0 | 1 | 0 | 0 | 0 | 0 | 0 | 1 | 0 | 0 |
| 27 | MF | (Germany) | Gonzalo Castro | 5 | 0 | 0 | 2 | 0 | 0 | 1 | 0 | 0 | 0 | 0 | 0 | 8 | 0 | 0 |
| 28 | DF | (Germany) | Matthias Ginter | 4 | 0 | 0 | 0 | 0 | 0 | 2 | 0 | 0 | 0 | 0 | 0 | 6 | 0 | 0 |
| 29 | DF | (Germany) | Marcel Schmelzer | 3 | 0 | 0 | 0 | 0 | 0 | 2 | 0 | 0 | 0 | 0 | 0 | 5 | 0 | 0 |
| 30 | MF | (Germany) | Felix Passlack | 1 | 0 | 0 | 0 | 0 | 0 | 1 | 0 | 0 | 1 | 0 | 0 | 3 | 0 | 0 |
| 32 | MF | (Germany) | Dženis Burnić | 1 | 0 | 0 | 0 | 0 | 0 | 0 | 0 | 0 | 0 | 0 | 0 | 1 | 0 | 0 |
| 33 | MF | (Germany) | Julian Weigl | 2 | 0 | 0 | 2 | 0 | 0 | 1 | 0 | 0 | 0 | 0 | 0 | 5 | 0 | 0 |
| 37 | DF | (Germany) | Erik Durm | 1 | 0 | 0 | 0 | 0 | 0 | 0 | 0 | 0 | 0 | 0 | 0 | 1 | 0 | 0 |
| 38 | GK | (Switzerland) | Roman Bürki | 1 | 0 | 0 | 1 | 0 | 0 | 1 | 0 | 0 | 0 | 0 | 0 | 3 | 0 | 0 |
| Totals | | | | 53 | 1 | 1 | 11 | 1 | 0 | 19 | 0 | 0 | 3 | 0 | 0 | 82 | 1 | 1 |

Last updated: 27 May 2017
