= Melissa Jiménez =

Melissa Jiménez may refer to:

- Melissa Jiménez (singer)
- Melissa Jiménez (journalist)
- Melissa Jiménez (model)
