= Marc Bartra =

Spanish footballer (born 1991)

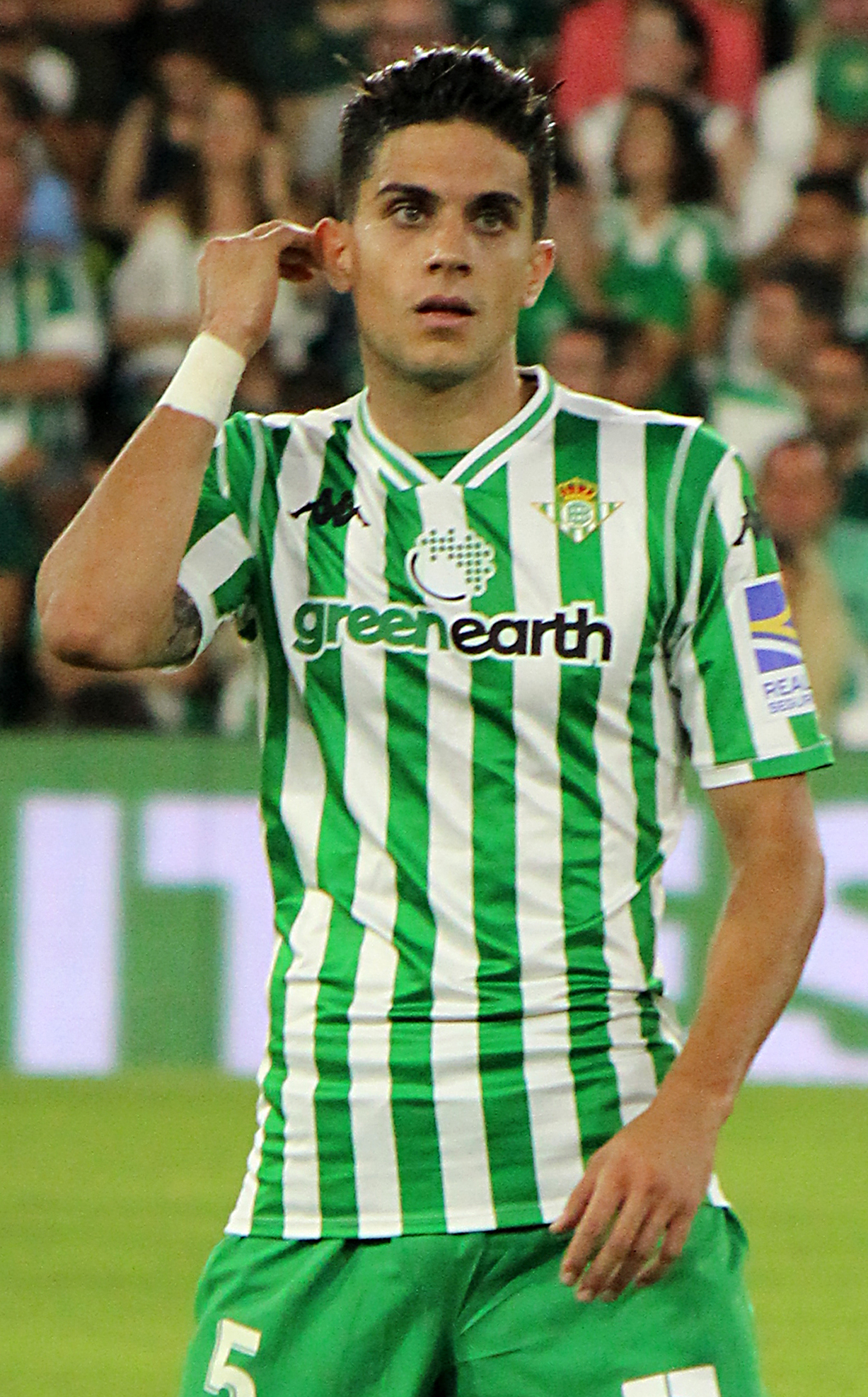
- Bartra with Betis in 2018

Personal information
- Full name: Marc Bartra Aregall
- Date of birth: 15 January 1991 (age 35)
- Place of birth: Sant Jaume dels Domenys, Spain
- Height: 1.84 m (6 ft 0 in)
- Position: Centre-back

Team information
- Current team: Betis
- Number: 5

Youth career
- 2000–2002: Espanyol
- 2002–2009: Barcelona

Senior career*
Years	Team	Apps	(Gls)
2009–2012	Barcelona B	81	(2)
2010–2016	Barcelona	59	(5)
2016–2018	Borussia Dortmund	31	(2)
2018–2022	Betis	121	(6)
2022–2023	Trabzonspor	29	(4)
2023–	Betis	61	(6)

International career
2009	Spain U18	3	(0)
2009–2010	Spain U19	11	(0)
2011	Spain U20	7	(0)
2011–2013	Spain U21	16	(2)
2013–2018	Spain	14	(1)
2010–2022	Catalonia	7	(1)
Medal record
Representing Spain
UEFA European Under-21 Championship
Winner	2013 Israel
- * Club domestic league appearances and goals as of 19:29, 11 November 2026 (UTC)

Marc Bartra Aregall (Catalan: [ˈmaɾɡ ˈbaɾtɾə əɾəˈɣaʎ], Spanish: [ˈmaɾɣ ˈβaɾtɾa aɾeˈɣal]; born 15 January 1991) is a Spanish professional footballer who plays as a centre-back for La Liga club Real Betis.

He started his career at Barcelona, where he played 103 professional games and scored six goals across seven seasons, winning 13 honours including five La Liga titles and two UEFA Champions League trophies (including a continental treble in 2015). In 2016, he joined Borussia Dortmund for €8 million, lifting the DFB-Pokal in his first season. He returned to Spain in 2018, playing 146 total games for Betis and winning the Copa del Rey in 2022.

Bartra won the 2013 European Championship with Spain's under-21 team. He made his senior debut in 2013, and was selected in the squad for Euro 2016.

== Club career ==
=== Barcelona ===
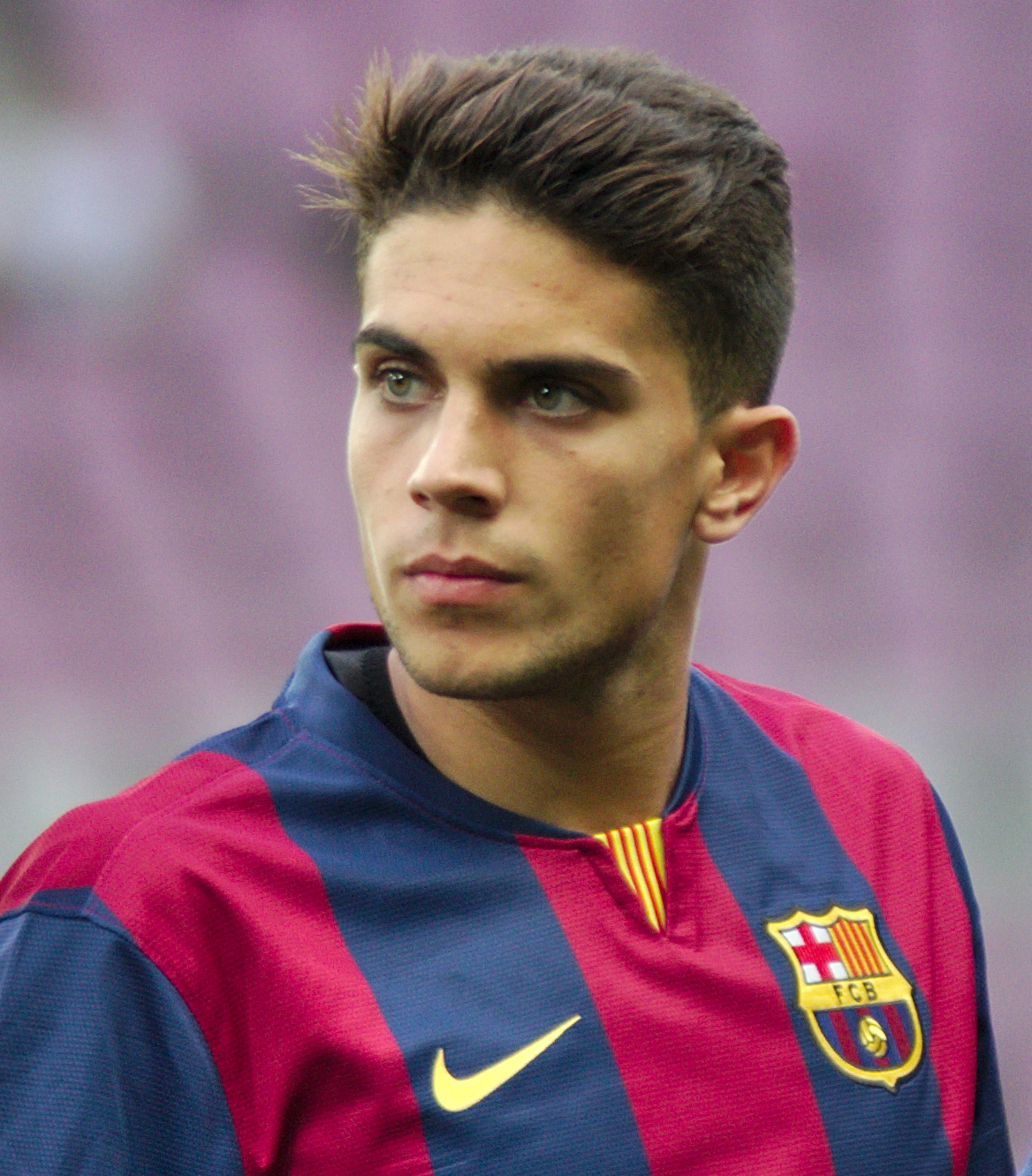
Bartra with Barcelona in 2014

Born in Sant Jaume dels Domenys, Tarragona, Catalonia, Bartra joined Espanyol as a child before moving to Barcelona's youth system, La Masia, at age 11. After progressing through its ranks, he was promoted to the B side in 2009.

Bartra made his first-team debut on 14 February 2010, coming on as a substitute for Jeffrén Suárez for the final 30 minutes of a 2–1 loss to Atlético Madrid at the Vicente Calderón Stadium. He started his first La Liga game one year and three months later, playing the entire 0–0 home draw against Deportivo de La Coruña, and scored his first goal on 21 May 2011 to help them come from behind to win 3–1 at Málaga in the season's last round.

In the 2012–13 campaign, Bartra joined the first team squad permanently, but manager Tito Vilanova tended to field Javier Mascherano, Alex Song and Adriano ahead of him, and only appeared in 16 matches in all competitions. He signed a new three-year contract in March 2014.

On 16 April 2014, in the final of the Copa del Rey against Real Madrid, with five minutes remaining, Gareth Bale outsprinted Bartra from the halfway line – with the former running off the field at one point – before scoring the 2–1 winner. He himself had levelled the score midway into the second half from a Xavi corner kick.

Bartra remained a third or fourth choice under new manager Luis Enrique. He made 25 appearances and scored once as the team won the treble in 2014–15.

=== Borussia Dortmund ===
On 3 June 2016, Bartra was sold to German club Borussia Dortmund for an estimated fee of €8 million, signing a four-year deal. He made his competitive debut on 14 August, playing the entire 2–0 loss against Bayern Munich in the DFL-Supercup, and a month later scored his first goal in a 6–0 victory at Legia Warsaw in the group stage of the UEFA Champions League.

On 11 April 2017, when Dortmund were heading to Westfalenstadion for their Champions League quarter-final tie against Monaco, the team bus was hit by three explosions. Bartra, who broke the radial bone in his arm and had debris lodged in his hand in the bombing, underwent an operation the following day, when the Germans played the rescheduled game and lost 3–2; he later described the event as the "longest and hardest 15 minutes of my life", and returned to training 29 days after his surgery.

Bartra's first match after returning took place on 20 May 2017, and he played the entire 4–3 home win over Werder Bremen– he had also been an unused substitute in the previous fixture against FC Augsburg. One week later, he helped to victory in the DFB-Pokal after starting in the 2–1 defeat of Eintracht Frankfurt in Berlin.

=== Betis ===
On 30 January 2018, Bartra completed his transfer to Real Betis on a five-and-a-half-year contract. He scored his first goal for his new team on 12 May, putting the hosts ahead in an eventual 2–2 derby home draw against Sevilla.

From December 2020 to the following March, Bartra was sidelined with tendonitis in his Achilles and a gallbladder issue, leading to significant weight loss. He played the full 120 minutes of the 2022 Copa del Rey final on 23 April, a penalty shootout win over Valencia.

=== Trabzonspor ===
On 14 August 2022, Bartra signed for Trabzonspor in the Turkish Süper Lig for €1.25 million. He made his debut two days later in the Champions League play-off first leg away to Copenhagen as a substitute in a 2–1 loss. His first goal on 18 September came in added time to win 3–2 at home against Gaziantep, and on 28 December he equalised at Fatih Karagümrük but was sent off with a straight red card before half time in a 4–1 defeat.

Bartra left the club on 11 July 2023 by mutual agreement.

=== Return to Betis ===
On 24 July 2023, Bartra rejoined Betis on a one-year contract. In October, he was diagnosed with Haglund's syndrome in the Achilles tendon of his right leg and missed several months.

Bartra contributed 25 games in both the 2024–25 and 2025–26 seasons, with his side finishing fifth in the latter to return to the Champions League after a 21-year absence. On 8 September 2026, in the competition's league phase, he scored twice from headers following set pieces in a 3–2 away victory over Lille.

== International career ==
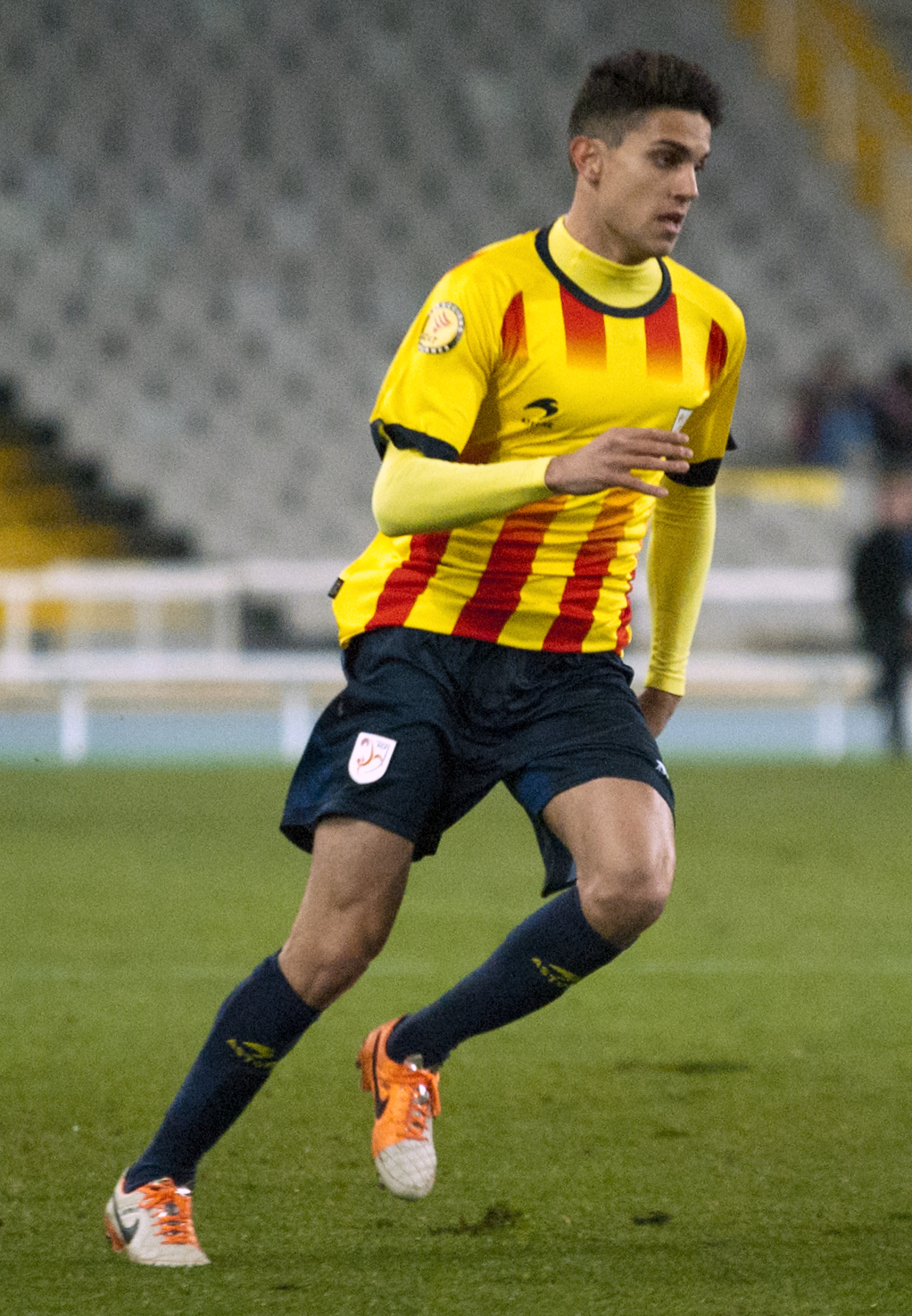
Bartra playing for Catalonia in 2013

Bartra won 37 caps for Spain across all youth levels, including 16 for the under-21s. He made his debut for the full side on 16 November 2013, playing the entire 2–1 friendly win in Equatorial Guinea. This game was later annulled by FIFA as they had not been notified early enough that the referee would be from Equatorial Guinea, and his first valid appearance took place on 8 September 2014 as he came on as a 68th-minute substitute for Sergio Ramos in a 5–1 home victory against Macedonia for the UEFA Euro 2016 qualifiers.

In May 2016, Bartra was named in Vicente del Bosque's provisional squad of 25 for Euro 2016, and he also made it to the final list of 23. As the tournament held in France ended at the round of 16, he was an unused member.

Bartra scored the only goal for his country on 11 October 2018, contributing to a 4–1 friendly defeat of Wales at the Millennium Stadium.

== Style of play ==
Bartra is known for his pace and passing. He is mentally strong, is skilled in the air and is able to play as a right-back, where he can cut in and assist.

== Personal life ==
Bartra's fraternal twin brother, Èric, also came through La Masia. He started a relationship with Grand Prix motorcycle racing journalist Melissa Jiménez in February 2014, and welcomed daughter Gala on 18 August of the following year; having married in June 2017, in 2022 the couple announced that they had been separated for months and were in the process of getting divorced.

== Career statistics ==
=== Club ===
As of match played 8 November 2026

Appearances and goals by club, season and competition
Club	Season	League			National cup (Note: Includes Copa del Rey, DFB-Pokal, Turkish Cup)		Europe		Other		Total	
Club	Season	Division	Apps	Goals	Apps	Goals	Apps	Goals	Apps	Goals	Apps	Goals
Barcelona B	2009–10	Segunda División B	30	1	—		—		—		30	1
Barcelona B	2010–11	Segunda División	28	1	—		—		—		28	1
Barcelona B	2011–12	Segunda División	23	0	—		—		—		23	0
Barcelona B	Total		81	2	—		—		—		81	2
Barcelona	2009–10	La Liga	1	0	0	0	0	0	0	0	1	0
Barcelona	2010–11	La Liga	2	1	2	0	1 (Note: Appearances in UEFA Champions League)	0	0	0	5	1
Barcelona	2011–12	La Liga	1	0	0	0	1	0	0	0	2	0
Barcelona	2012–13	La Liga	8	0	2	0	6	0	0	0	16	0
Barcelona	2013–14	La Liga	20	1	6	1	4	0	0	0	30	2
Barcelona	2014–15	La Liga	14	1	5	0	6	0	—		25	1
Barcelona	2015–16	La Liga	13	2	5	0	4	0	2 (Note: One appearance in UEFA Super Cup, one appearance in Supercopa de España)	0	24	2
Barcelona	Total		59	5	20	1	22	0	2	0	103	6
Borussia Dortmund	2016–17	Bundesliga	19	0	4	0	7	1	1 (Note: Appearance in DFL-Supercup)	0	31	1
Borussia Dortmund	2017–18	Bundesliga	12	2	3	2	4	0	1	0	20	4
Borussia Dortmund	Total		31	2	7	2	11	1	2	0	51	5
Betis	2017–18	La Liga	16	1	—		—		—		16	1
Betis	2018–19	La Liga	33	1	7	0	6 (Note: Appearances in UEFA Europa League)	0	—		46	1
Betis	2019–20	La Liga	30	3	3	0	—		—		33	3
Betis	2020–21	La Liga	19	0	0	0	—		—		19	0
Betis	2021–22	La Liga	23	1	5	1	4	0	—		32	2
Betis	Total		121	6	15	1	10	0	—		146	7
Trabzonspor	2022–23	Süper Lig	29	4	1	0	10 (Note: Two appearances in UEFA Champions League, six appearances in UEFA Europa League, two appearances in UEFA Europa Conference League)	0	—		40	4
Betis	2023–24	La Liga	3	0	0	0	1	0	—		4	0
Betis	2024–25	La Liga	25	2	2	1	10 (Note: Appearances in UEFA Conference League)	0	—		37	3
Betis	2025–26	La Liga	25	1	4	0	5	0	—		34	1
Betis	2026–27	La Liga	8	3	0	0	3	2	—		11	5
Betis	Total		61	6	6	1	19	2	0	0	86	9
Career total			382	25	49	5	72	3	4	0	507	33

=== International ===
Appearances and goals by national team and year
National team	Year	Apps	Goals
Spain	2013	1	0
Spain	2014	3	0
Spain	2015	3	0
Spain	2016	5	0
Spain	2017	1	0
Spain	2018	1	1
Total		14	1

Scores and results list Spain's goal tally first, score column indicates score after each Bartra goal.

List of international goals scored by Marc Bartra
No.	Date	Venue	Cap	Opponent	Score	Result	Competition
1	11 October 2018	Millennium Stadium, Cardiff, Wales	14	Wales	4–0	4–1	Friendly

== Honours ==
Barcelona

- La Liga: 2009–10, 2010–11, 2012–13, 2014–15, 2015–16
- Copa del Rey: 2011–12, 2014–15, 2015–16
- Supercopa de España: 2013
- UEFA Champions League: 2010–11, 2014–15
- UEFA Super Cup: 2015
- FIFA Club World Cup: 2015

Borussia Dortmund

- DFB-Pokal: 2016–17

Betis

- Copa del Rey: 2021–22
- UEFA Conference League runner-up: 2024–25

Spain U19

- UEFA European Under-19 Championship runner-up: 2010

Spain U21

- UEFA European Under-21 Championship: 2013

Individual

- UEFA European Under-21 Championship Team of the Tournament: 2013
- UEFA La Liga Team of the Season: 2017–18
