= Melissa Jiménez (journalist) =

Spanish journalist

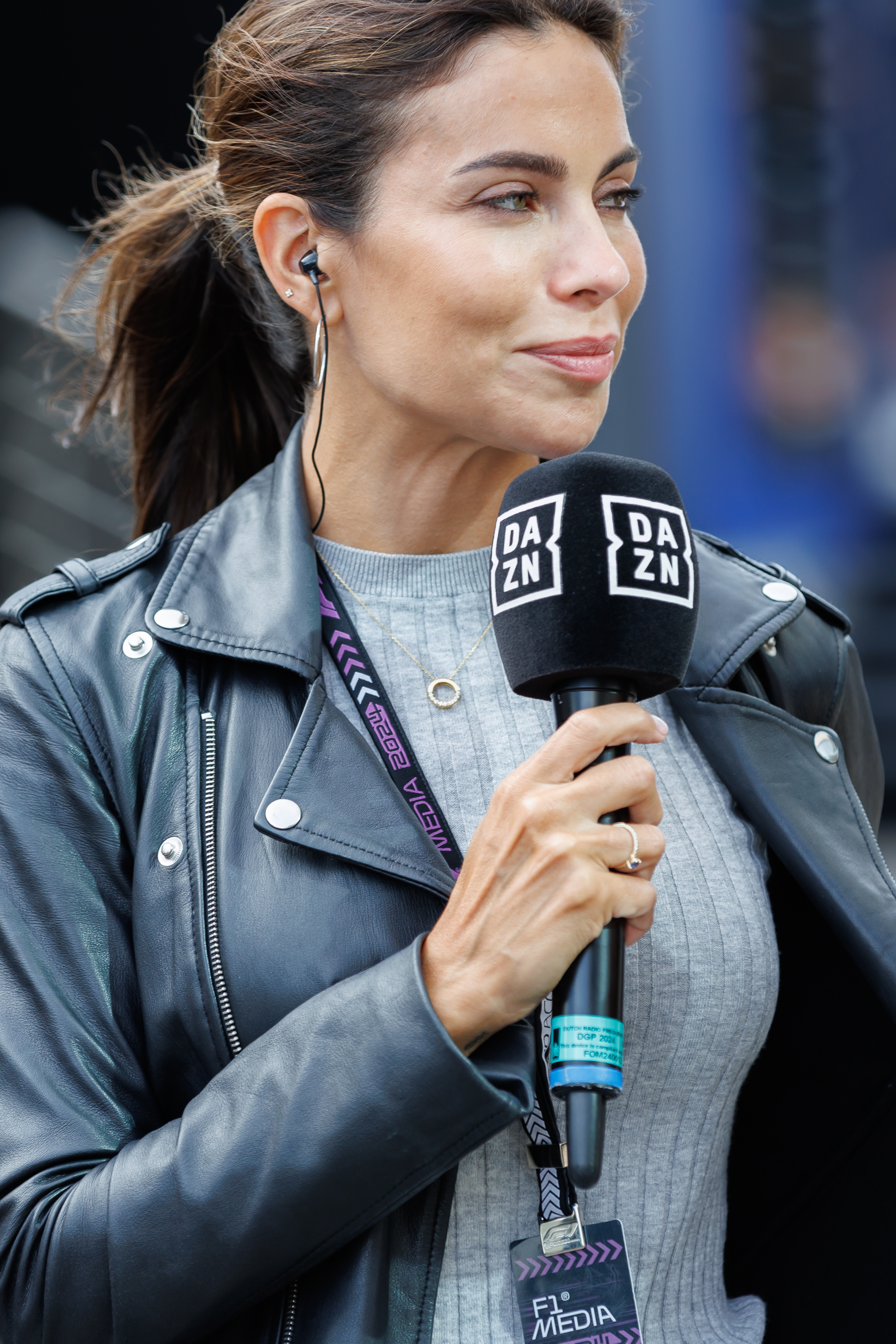
- Jiménez at the 2024 Dutch Grand Prix
- Born: Melissa María Jiménez Dionisio; 26 June 1987 (age 39); Liège, Belgium
- Citizenship: Spanish
- Occupation: Journalist
- Employer: Telecinco DAZN
- Spouse: Marc Bartra (m. 2017; div. 2022)
- Partner: Fernando Alonso
- Children: 4

Melissa María Jiménez Dionisio (born in Liège, Belgium, on 26 June 1987) is a Spanish sports journalist working for DAZN.

== Biography ==
Melissa Jiménez is the daughter of Antonio Jiménez, (son of Spanish emigrants and born in Granada in 1963) and Italian mother Luciana Dionisio. She has a younger sister named Sara. At the age of two years, she moved to Barcelona, since her father was starting to work in the motorcycle world championship under the orders of JJ Cobas.

She grew up in a very small town 60 km from Barcelona and went to the races with her father whenever she could. Since she was a child, Jiménez knew she wanted to work in the MotoGP World Championship. She studied Communication Sciences in Barcelona and did an internship at Onda Rambla. She spent two years working both on the radio and in 25TV and after finishing her degree she moved to Madrid, where she collaborated with MARCA TV. A year and a half later, Sky Sport Italia invited her to broadcast motorcycle racing with them and she went to Milan, commentated on pre-season training sessions, and worked as head of press for the Forward Racing Moto2 team.

In 2013, Jiménez returned to Spain to join the Mediaset España sports newsroom. She joined the motorcycle broadcasting team as a commentator in the paddock, replacing Lara Álvarez. Two years later, Jiménez announced through her Instagram account that she would no longer be part of the Moto GP commentary team.

In October 2016, she participated as a guest on the fifth season of Antena 3's musical program Tu cara me suena, where she impersonated Nelly Furtado to sing the song "I'm Like A Bird".

In 2022, she was confirmed to join DAZN F1 to be the reporter at Formula One circuits.

== Television career ==
Jiménez began her career in the television channel 25TV and later became part of MarcaTV presenting "Tiramillas", "Marca Motor", "Marca Player" and "Zamoras y Pichichis". Then, she worked for Sky's Italian division as a motor specialist in the program Sky Sport 24h. In 2012, she was on the verge of signing with Telecinco. The network, in the end, opted for Lara Álvarez and Jiménez returned to Sky Italia. There, she did the race summaries from the studio. The second call from Telecinco caught her recording a spot with Alex De Angelis, an Italian Moto2 rider. From 2013 until 2015, she was a reporter at the foot of the paddock in the MotoGP OF Telecinco, along with Nico Abad. In March 2016, after two years working in MotoGP, Mediaset España announced the departure of Jiménez for the next season.

== Personal life ==
From June 2013 to February 2014, Jiménez was romantically involved with singer Dani Martín.

A few months later, she started dating the then FC Barcelona footballer Marc Bartra. In June 2016, they moved to Dortmund, Germany, due to Bartra's transfer to Borussia Dortmund. The couple announced their engagement through their social networks on 10 October 2016. They got married in Barcelona during June of 2017. They have two daughters and a son together. As a result of the 2018 signing of Bartra by Real Betis, Jiménez moved to Seville. In January 2022, the couple announced that they had been separated for months and were in the process of getting divorced.

In December 2025, it was announced that she was expecting her fourth child, her first one with Formula One driver Fernando Alonso. The baby was born in March 2026. On 2 April, it was revealed that their son was named Leonard Alonso Jiménez, and that he had received a lifetime Paddock Pass.
