= Borussia Dortmund team bus bombing =

2017 bomb attack in Germany

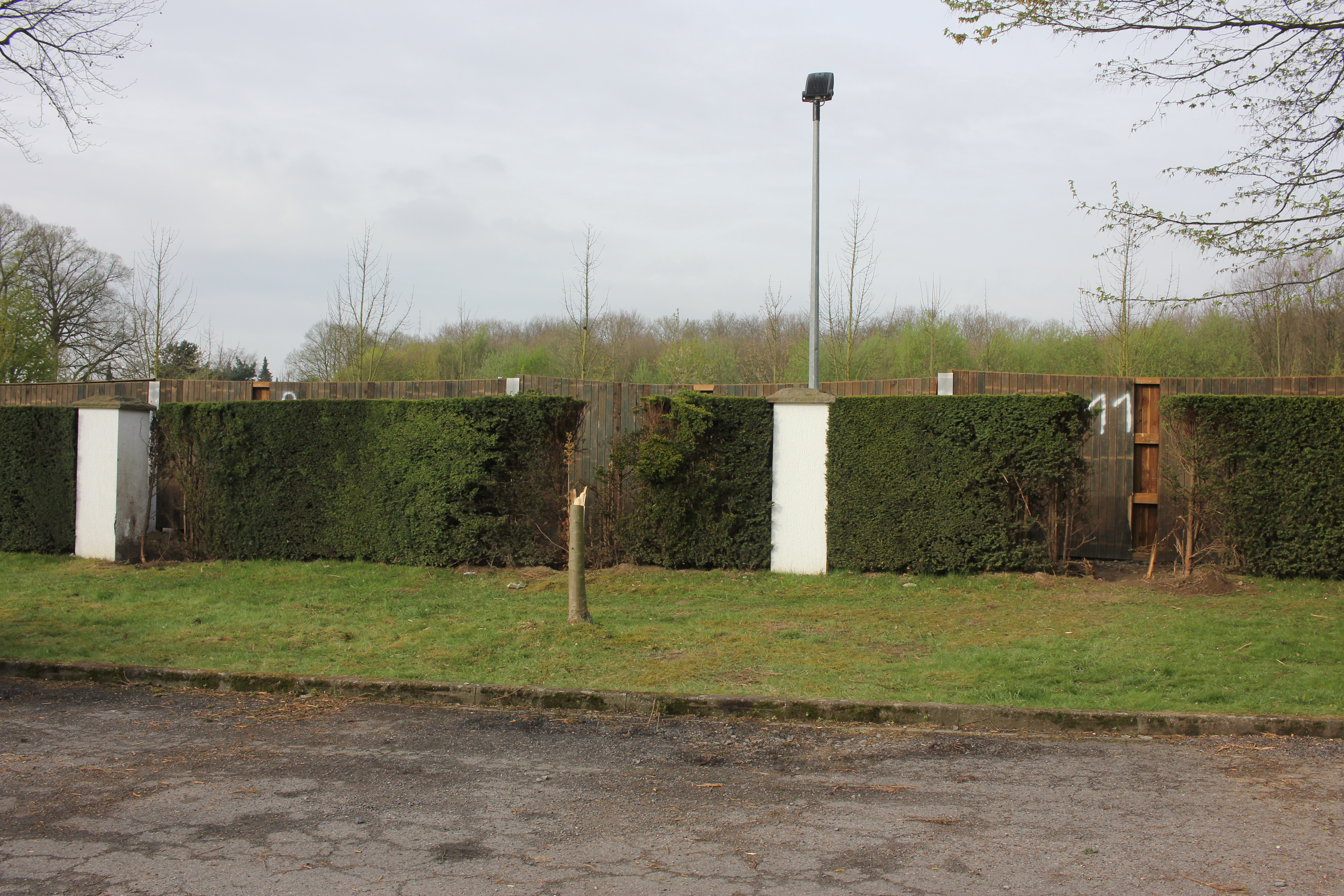
- The hedge damaged by the blasts

- Dortmund (North Rhine-Westphalia) Dortmund (Germany)
- Location: 51°26′59″N 7°30′22″E; Dortmund, Germany
- Date: 11 April 2017; 19:15 CEST (UTC+2)
- Target: Borussia Dortmund team
- Attack type: Bombing
- Weapon: 3 explosives
- Deaths: 0
- Injuries: 2
- Motive: Market manipulation

On 11 April 2017, the tour bus of the German football team Borussia Dortmund was attacked with roadside bombs in Dortmund, Germany. Three bombs exploded as the bus ferried the team to the Westfalenstadion for the first leg of their quarter-final against Monaco in the UEFA Champions League. One of the team's players, Marc Bartra, and a policeman were wounded, but the strengthened windows of the bus prevented casualties.

On 21 April 2017, German police arrested Sergej Wenergold on suspicion of planting bombs to drive down the Borussia Dortmund share price and profit by put warrants he bought prior to the attack. On 27 November 2018, he was sentenced to 14 years in prison.

== Bombing ==
The team bus of Borussia Dortmund was attacked with three homemade pipe bombs while on its way to Westfalenstadion in Dortmund. The bombs were hidden in hedges by the roadside and detonated at around 19:15 local time (17:15 UTC). They were packed with sharp metal pins and had a reach of about 100 metres (109 yards). Based on the type of detonator and explosive involved, German authorities assumed it was a "terrorist involvement". The bombs used military detonators and the explosives may have come from military stocks. Spanish footballer and Dortmund's team member Marc Bartra was wounded by shards of glass from the shattered bus window; he was taken to a nearby hospital where his right wrist was immediately operated on. A policeman suffered blast injury and shock; he was escorting the bus on a motorcycle. It is considered very likely that without the strength of the bus that there would have been mass casualties. Another Spanish Dortmund player, Mikel Merino, revealed in 2026 that shrapnel hit his usual seat on the bus, but he had moved to the front row to stretch his legs.

At the time, the bus was on its way to the first leg of Borussia Dortmund's 2016–17 UEFA Champions League quarter-final against Monaco at the Signal Iduna Park; the match was rescheduled for the following day, which Dortmund lost 3–2.

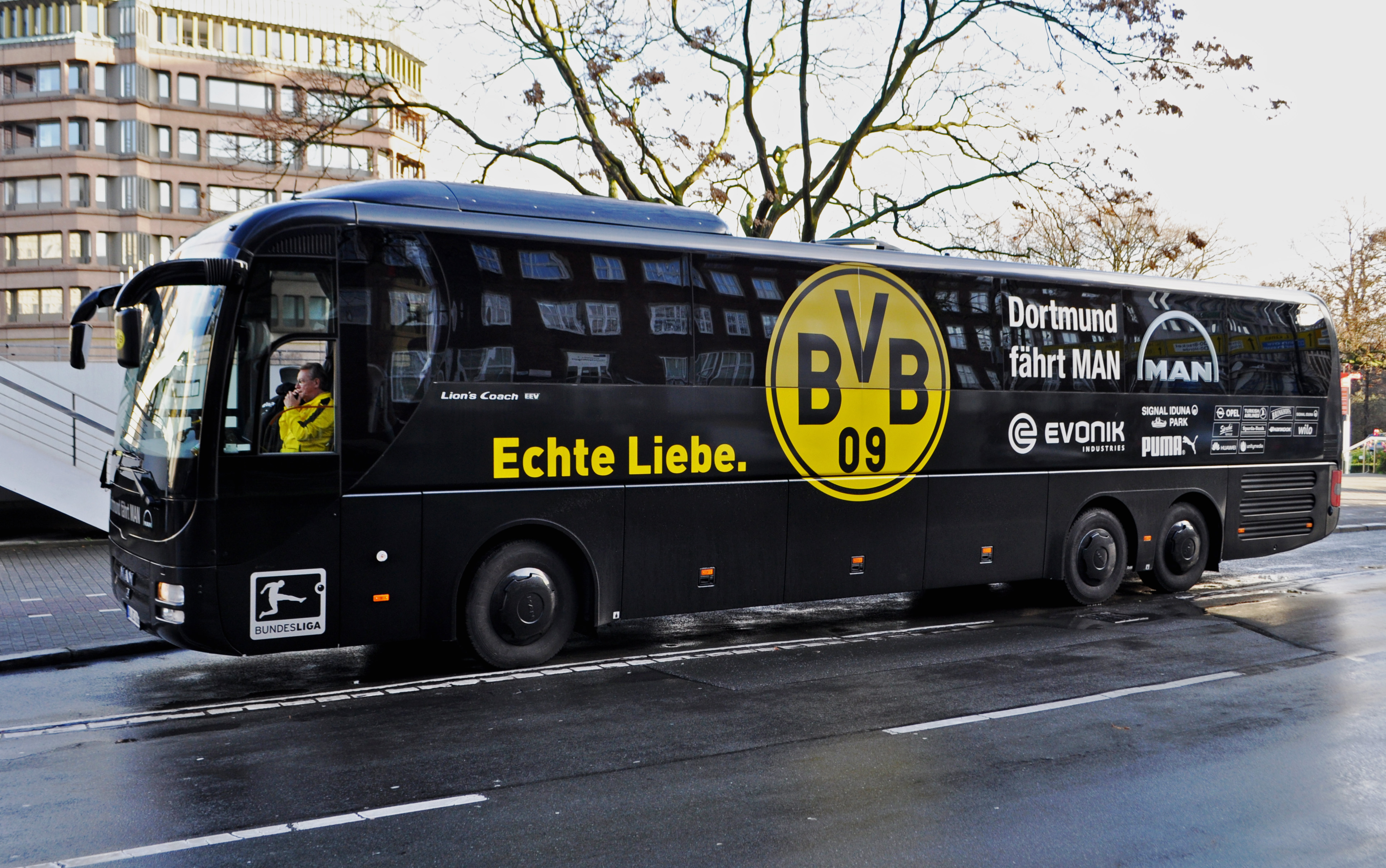
The team bus of Borussia Dortmund in 2015

== Investigation ==
The German police and state lawyers treated the bombing as attempted murder and a planned attack on Borussia Dortmund. There were three claims of responsibility: one left at the scene claiming an Islamist motive, one posted on the internet claiming an 'anti-fascist' motive (which was deemed to be fake), and one later sent to a newspaper claiming a far-right motive. The German Federal Prosecutor's Office initially called the attack an act of terrorism with possible Islamist involvement. The Interior Minister of North Rhine-Westphalia called the attack "professional". Police investigated whether it was an attack by Islamists, by the far-left or by the far-right. According to German media at the time, investigators also considered whether a foreign security service was behind the bombing.

=== Claims of responsibility ===
There were three differing claims of responsibility. The first claim was found in three identical letters left at the scene. The letters said the attack was retaliation for German military intervention against Islamic State (ISIS) in Iraq and Syria, accusing it of being responsible for killing Muslims. It demanded that the US military base in Ramstein be shut down and the German Tornado jets be withdrawn from Syria. It threatened further attacks on non-Muslim celebrities in Germany unless the demands are met. The letters were seen as unusual, as previous ISIS-linked attacks in Europe did not come with such confessions. Unlike previous video claims of responsibility, the letters directly addressed the German chancellor and had no religious justifications, ISIS logo, or signature. German newspapers later reported that investigators had "significant doubts" over the letters' authenticity, and suggested they may have been written to frame Islamists.

Another claim was posted on the left-wing, open-publishing website IndyMedia. Initially there were claims that the Borussia Dortmund supporter's groups were infiltrated by neo-Nazi sympathizers which in the beginning, people believed could have led to the terrorist attacks. It said the attack was committed because Borussia Dortmund did not do enough against racists and Nazis, who are believed to have some involvement in the club's supporter groups. The claim was removed as fake, and police also treated it as fake.

A few days later, a third claim of responsibility was sent to the newspaper Der Tagesspiegel, which hinted at a far-right motive. The anonymous e-mail praised Adolf Hitler and attacked multiculturalism, adding that the attack was a "last warning". A spokeswoman for the federal prosecutors said the claim was being investigated. The letter also threatened another attack on protesters who plan to demonstrate against the Alternative for Germany party's conference in Cologne on 22 April. Police also considered the possibility that the attack was carried out by the far-right in order to incite backlash against Muslims.

=== Suspects ===
In the initial stage of the investigation, the police identified two suspects and arrested one of them. The apartments of both suspects were searched for clues. The arrested suspect was an Iraqi immigrant living in Wuppertal and was suspected of being an Islamist extremist. Police believed he led an ISIS unit in Iraq involved in killings, kidnappings, smuggling, and extortion. However, police later concluded he was not responsible for the Dortmund bombing.

On 21 April 2017, the federal prosecutor announced that it had arrested a 28-year-old German-Russian citizen, identified as Sergej Wenergold, on suspicion of 20-fold attempted murder, bringing about an illegal detonation of explosives, and aggravated battery. The man had been staying at the Borussia team hotel. He planted explosives along the road where the team bus would later leave to the stadium. During check-in, he chose a room with a window facing the road so he would be able to remotely trigger the explosion when the bus passed by. It was revealed that on the day of the attack, he had bought put warrants for €78,000 from an investment bank using the internet connection in his hotel room. Put warrants are derivatives that increase in value as the underlying security drops in price, a mechanism similar to short-selling. They would have made him a large profit of up to €3.9 million if Dortmund's share price had indeed plummeted after a successful attack, but it only dropped by 5% after the attack and later recovered. The unusual transaction raised suspicion of money laundering with bank employees, prompting them to alert authorities and pass to them the identity of Wenergold, which led to his arrest. Police also said the suspect left letters at the scene of the crime to frame Islamic terrorists for the attack. The Atlantic criticized that the general public were too quick to blame Islamic extremists despite authorities challenging the veracity of the letters, and said the suspect belonged to a new category of extremism that they called "terrorism for profit".

=== Trial ===
Sergej Wenergold was charged with 28 counts of attempted murder for the attack. He admitted during the trial that he learned how to make the bomb on Google. He also said that he intentionally put less materials in the bomb than suggested on Google so that way he would not kill them. He used three pipe-made bombs in his attack. Marc Bartra, a defender for Borussia Dortmund, testified at Wenergold's trial, saying that he feared for his life as the bomb blew up and injured him. Bartra suffered a fractured wrist in the attack and had to spend five days in the hospital in its aftermath. Wenergold had tried to apologize to Bartra during the trial. However, Bartra would not acknowledge his attacker as he discussed how his life had been altered by the bombing of the team bus. German prosecutors in court argued that Wenergold should be sentenced to life in prison for his actions. Wenergold argued that he did not mean to kill anyone with his attack but the prosecutors argued that it was not true and that he intended to kill as many Dortmund members as possible. In November 2018, Wenergold was sentenced to 14 years in prison for his attack on the Borussia Dortmund team bus.

== Aftermath ==
The match was postponed until the following day at 18:45 local time (16:45 UTC), which resulted in a 3–2 win for Monaco. While Borussia Dortmund wanted the game to be postponed more than one day, UEFA pushed for the game to be played regardless or they would have to forfeit. After consulting with the players, Borussia Dortmund CEO Hans-Joachim Watzke announced that the team had agreed to play. However, Thomas Tuchel, the team's manager complained publicly that the decision was forced upon them. There is a belief that this spat was the beginning of the end of Tuchel's tenure as manager of Borussia Dortmund, despite the team's victory in the DFB-Pokal at the end of the season. Both Monaco and Dortmund fans united in friendship after the bombing. Many Dortmund fans, Germans and local hotels offered Monaco fans free food and places to stay for the night. Chancellor of Germany Angela Merkel expressed her appalled reaction to the attack. The staff of Borussia Dortmund and former football player Lothar Matthäus criticized the short-term planning of UEFA.
