= 2026–27 Real Betis season =

Real Betis
2026–27 season
- President: Ángel Haro
- Head coach: Manuel Pellegrini
- Stadium: La Cartuja
- La Liga: 3rd
- Copa del Rey: First round
- UEFA Champions League: League phase
Home colours	Away colours	Third colours

The 2026–27 season is the 120th season in the history of Real Betis, and the club's twelfth consecutive season in La Liga. In addition to the domestic league, the club is participating in the Copa del Rey and the UEFA Champions League.

== Players ==
As of 1 September 2026

Note: Flags indicate national team as defined under FIFA eligibility rules; some limited exceptions apply. Players may hold more than one non-FIFA nationality.

No.	Pos.	Nation	Player
1	GK	ESP	Álvaro Valles
2	DF	ESP	Héctor Bellerín (3rd captain)
3	DF	ESP	Diego Llorente
4	DF	BRA	Natan
5	DF	ESP	Marc Bartra (vice-captain)
6	MF	URU	Facundo Bernal
7	FW	BRA	Antony
8	MF	ESP	Pablo Fornals
9	FW	COL	Cucho Hernández
10	FW	MAR	Abde Ezzalzouli
11	DF	ESP	Fran García
12	DF	ESP	Ángel Ortiz
13	GK	ESP	Diego Conde (on loan from Villarreal)

No.	Pos.	Nation	Player
14	FW	ESP	Iker Losada
15	MF	MEX	Álvaro Fidalgo
16	DF	ARG	Valentín Gómez
17	MF	ESP	Rodrigo Riquelme
18	MF	COL	Nelson Deossa
19	FW	IRL	Troy Parrott
20	MF	ARG	Giovanni Lo Celso
21	MF	ESP	Marc Roca
22	MF	ESP	Isco (captain)
23	DF	DOM	Junior Firpo
24	FW	ESP	Aitor Ruibal (4th captain)
25	MF	ESP	Dani Ceballos

== Transfers ==
=== In ===
Pos.	Player	Transferred from	Type	Date	Source
MF	(Uruguay) Facundo Bernal	(Brazil) Fluminense	Transfer	6 July 2026	
DF	(Spain) Fran García	(Spain) Real Madrid	Transfer	8 July 2026	
GK	(Spain) Diego Conde	(Spain) Villarreal	Loan	20 July 2026	
FW	(Republic of Ireland) Troy Parrott	(Netherlands) AZ	Transfer	20 August 2026	
MF	(Spain) Dani Ceballos	(Spain) Real Madrid	Transfer	1 September 2026	

=== Out ===
Pos.	Player	Transferred to	Type	Date	Source
GK	(Spain) Adrián	Retired		23 May 2026	
DF	(Senegal) Nobel Mendy	(Spain) Rayo Vallecano	Transfer	12 June 2026	
MF	(Spain) Mateo Flores	(Portugal) Arouca	Transfer	19 June 2026	
MF	(Spain) Sergi Altimira	(Portugal) Sporting CP	Transfer	30 June 2026	
GK	(Spain) Pau López	(Spain) Andorra	Free transfer	17 July 2026	
FW	(Spain) Pablo García	(Spain) Racing Santander	Transfer	1 September 2026	

== Competitions ==
=== Overall record ===
Competition	First match	Last match	Starting round	Final position	Record							
Competition	First match	Last match	Starting round	Final position	Pld	W	D	L	GF	GA	GD	Win %
La Liga	21 August 2026	28–30 May 2027	Matchday 1	TBD	10	6	2	2	16	14	+2	60.00
Copa del Rey	October 2026	TBD	First round	TBD	0	0	0	0	0	0	+0	—
UEFA Champions League	8 September 2026	TBD	League phase	TBD	3	3	0	0	7	4	+3	100.00
Total					13	9	2	2	23	18	+5	69.23

Last updated: 31 October 2026
Source: Soccerway

=== La Liga ===
==== League table ====
Pos	Team	Pld	W	D	L	GF	GA	GD	Pts	Qualification or relegation
2	Real Madrid	13	11	0	2	33	11	+22	33	Qualification for the UEFA Champions League league phase
3	Atlético Madrid	12	9	1	2	23	10	+13	28	Qualification for the UEFA Champions League league phase
4	Real Betis	13	8	3	2	21	16	+5	27	Qualification for the UEFA Champions League league phase
5	Real Sociedad	12	7	1	4	21	20	+1	22	Qualification for the UEFA Europa League league phase
6	Sevilla	13	5	4	4	18	20	−2	19	Qualification for the UEFA Conference League play-off round

Updated to match(es) played on 21 November 2026. Source: LaLiga EA Sports
Rules for classification: 1) Points; 2) Head-to-head points; 3) Head-to-head goal difference; 4) Goal difference; 5) Goals scored; 6) Fair-play points (if three or more teams tied); 7) Play-off at neutral site.
(Note: Head-to-head record is used only after all the matches between the teams in question have been played)

==== Results summary ====
Overall								Home						Away					
Pld	W	D	L	GF	GA	GD	Pts	W	D	L	GF	GA	GD	W	D	L	GF	GA	GD
11	7	2	2	18	15	+3	23	5	0	1	12	8	+4	2	2	1	6	7	−1

Last updated: 31 October 2026.
Source: La Liga

==== Results by round ====
Round	2	1	3	4	5	6	7	8	9	10	11	12	13	14	15	16	17	18	19	20	21	22	23	24	25	26	27	28	29	30	31	32	33	34	35	36	37	38
Ground	H	A	A	H	A	H	A	H	H	A	H	A	A	H	A	H	A	H	A	H	A	H	H	A	A	H	A	H	A	H	A	H	A	H	H	A	A	H
Result	W	W	L	W	W	W	D	W	L	D	W	W	D																									
Position	2	4	7	4	3	3	3	3	4	4	4	4																										

Updated to match(es) played on 21 November 2026. Source: La Liga
A = Away; H = Home; W = Win; D = Draw; L = Loss

==== Matches ====
The match schedule was released on 30 June 2026.

21 August 2026 2	Real Betis	1–0	Real Sociedad	Seville
21:00 CEST (UTC+2)	Riquelme 63'; Natan (yellow card) 80'; F. García (yellow card) 90'; Bellerín (yellow card) 90+2'	Report	Gómez (yellow card) 46'; Aramburu (yellow card) 49'; Zubeldia (yellow card) 61'	Stadium: La Cartuja; Attendance: 59,490; Referee: Isidro Díaz De Mera Escuderos

25 August 2026 1	Valencia	0–1	Real Betis	Valencia
21:00 CEST (UTC+2)	Satō (yellow card) 26'; Diakhaby (yellow card) 89'	Report	Firpo (yellow card) 42'; P. García 83'	Stadium: Mestalla; Attendance: 45,472; Referee: Jon Gonzales Esteban

29 August 2026 3	Levante	5–2	Real Betis	Valencia
17:00 CEST (UTC+2)	De la Fuente 24'; Bardeli 45+1'; Brugué 56', 70'; Toljan (yellow card) 86'; Olasagasti 90+5'	Report	Bartra 34'; Riquelme 45+4'; P. García (yellow card) 69'	Stadium: Ciutat de València; Attendance: 20,474; Referee: Ricardo de Burgos Bengoetxea

4 September 2026 4	Real Betis	1–0	Real Madrid	Seville
21:00 CEST (UTC+2)	Bernal (yellow card) 64'; Parrott 81'; Roca (yellow card) 83'; Natan (yellow card) 90+3'	Report	Güler (yellow card) 45+3'; Konaté (yellow card) 54'; Camavinga (yellow card) 61'; Mbappé (penalty missed) 90+4'	Stadium: La Cartuja; Attendance: 66,046; Referee: Alejandro Hernández Hernández

14 September 2026 5	Villarreal	1–2	Real Betis	Villarreal
21:00 CEST (UTC+2)	Gerard 29'; Veiga (yellow card) 84'	Report	Hernández 39'; Natan 43'	Stadium: Estadio de la Cerámica; Attendance: 18,267; Referee: Francisco José Hernández Maeso

17 September 2026 6	Real Betis	1–0	Getafe	Seville
19:00 CEST (UTC+2)	Ortiz (yellow card) 24'; Ezzalzouli 45'	Report	Davinchi (yellow card) 25'; Martín (yellow card) 53' (yellow-red card) 87'; Gudelj (yellow card) 70'; Boselli (yellow card) 74'	Stadium: La Cartuja; Attendance: 57,792; Referee: José María Sánchez Martínez

20 September 2026 7	Deportivo A Coruña	1–1	Real Betis	A Coruña
18:30 CEST (UTC+2)	Ede (yellow card) 3'; Villares 87'	Report	Hernández 43'; Gómez (yellow card) 65'	Stadium: Riazor; Attendance: 29,034; Referee: César Soto Grado

11 October 2026 8	Real Betis	5–2	Osasuna	Seville
18:30 CEST (UTC+2)	Isco 10' (pen.), 67'; Ezzalzouli 31'; Hernández (yellow card) 45+2'; Budimir 48' (o.g.); Roca (yellow card) 81'; Morante 90+6'	Report	Moncayola (yellow card) 41'; Santos (yellow card) 45'; Budimir 51'; García 56'; Torró (yellow card) 64'; Rosier (yellow card) 88'; Catena (yellow card) 90+6'	Stadium: La Cartuja; Attendance: 65,484; Referee: Carlos Muñiz Muñoz

17 October 2026 9	Real Betis	2–5	Barcelona	Seville
18:30 CEST (UTC+2)	Bellerín (yellow card) 22'; Gómez 27'; Ezzalzouli 53'; Bernal (red card) 54'; Llorente (yellow card) 61'	Report	Yamal 10', (yellow card) 55'; López (yellow card) 22'; Rodri 41'; Jesus 51'; Garcia 62'; Olmo 81'	Stadium: La Cartuja; Referee: Ricardo de Burgos Bengoetxea

25 October 2026 10	Celta Vigo	0–0	Real Betis	Vigo
16:15 CET (UTC+1)	Moriba (yellow card) 30'; Carreira (yellow card) 80'		Llorente (yellow card) 43'	Stadium: Balaídos Stadium; Attendance: 20,007; Referee: Isidro Díaz de Mera Escuderos

1 November 2026 11	Real Betis	2–1	Málaga	Seville
18:30 CET (UTC+1)	Bartra 38'; Fornals 45+2'; Deossa (yellow card) 90+1'; Ruibal (yellow card) 90+2'		Larrubia (yellow card) 20'; Rafita (yellow card) 38'; Niño 68'	Stadium: La Cartuja; Attendance: 64,119; Referee: Mateo Busquets Ferrer

8 November 2026 12	Elche	0–2	Real Betis	Elche
14:00 CET (UTC+1)	Redondo (yellow card) 59'; Diangana (yellow card) 68'; Neto (yellow card) 82'; Morcillo (yellow card) 84'	Report	Riquelme 81'; Bartra 89'	Stadium: Martínez Valero; Attendance: 31,388; Referee: César Soto Grado

22 November 2026 13	Sevilla	1–1	Real Betis	Seville
18:30 CET (UTC+1)	Agoumé (yellow card) 15'; Salas (yellow card) 18', (goal) 90+1'; Castrín (yellow card) 61'; Ure (yellow card) 84'; Iglesias (yellow card) 86'	Report	Firpo (yellow card) 11'; Hernández (yellow card) 11'; Antony 50'; Bellerín (yellow card) 79'; Fornals (yellow card) 86'	Stadium: Ramón Sánchez-Pizjuán; Referee: José María Sánchez Martínez

29 November 2026 14	Real Betis	v	Rayo Vallecano	Seville
				Stadium: La Cartuja

6 December 2026 15	Atlético Madrid	v	Real Betis	Madrid
				Stadium: Riyadh Air Metropolitano

13 December 2926 16	Real Betis	v	Racing Santander	Seville
				Stadium: La Cartuja

20 December 2026 17	Athletic Bilbao	v	Real Betis	Bilbao
				Stadium: San Mamés

3 January 2027 18	Real Betis	v	Alavés	Seville
				Stadium: La Cartuja

10 January 2027 19	Espanyol	v	Real Betis	Cornellà de Llobregat
				Stadium: Cornellà-El Prat

17 January 2027 20	Real Betis	v	Deportivo de A Coruña	Seville
				Stadium: La Cartuja

24 January 2027 21	Real Madrid	v	Real Betis	Madrid
				Stadium: Bernabéu

31 January 2027 22	Real Betis	v	Elche	Seville
				Stadium: La Cartuja

7 February 2027 23	Real Betis	v	Sevilla	Seville
				Stadium: La Cartuja

14 February 2027 24	Real Sociedad	v	Real Betis	San Sebastián
				Stadium: Anoeta

21 February 2027 25	Málaga	v	Real Betis	Málaga
				Stadium: La Rosaleda

28 February 2027 26	Real Betis	v	Villarreal	Seville
				Stadium: La Cartuja

7 March 2027 27	Barcelona	v	Real Betis	Barcelona
				Stadium: Spotify Camp Nou

14 March 2027 28	Real Betis	v	Levante	Seville
				Stadium: La Cartuja

21 March 2027 29	Racing Santander	v	Real Betis	Santander
				Stadium: El Sardinero

4 April 2027 30	Real Betis	v	Celta Vigo	Seville
				Stadium: La Cartuja

11 April 2027 31	Alavés	v	Real Betis	Vitoria-Gasteiz
				Stadium: Mendizorrotza

18 April 2027 32	Real Betis	v	Athletic Bilbao	Seville
				Stadium: La Cartuja

21 April 2027 33	Getafe	v	Real Betis	Getafe
				Stadium: Coliseum

2 May 2027 34	Real Betis	v	Valencia	Seville
				Stadium: La Cartuja

9 May 2027 35	Real Betis	v	Espanyol	Seville
				Stadium: La Cartuja

16 May 2027 36	Osasuna	v	Real Betis	Pamplona
				Stadium: El Sadar

23 May 2027 37	Rayo Vallecano	v	Real Betis	Madrid
				Stadium: Vallecas

30 May 2027 38	Real Betis	v	Atlético Madrid	Seville
				Stadium: La Cartuja

=== Copa del Rey ===
12 November 2026	Navalcarnero	v	Real Betis	Alcorcón (Note: Navalcarnero will not play the match in their main stadium Mariano González, Navalcarnero, as it did not meet the broadcasting requirements.)
19:00		Report		Stadium: Santo Domingo
Note: Originally scheduled to 28 October 2026, the match was postponed due to a train collision in Urda.

=== UEFA Champions League ===
==== League phase ====
The draw for the league phase was held on 27 August 2026. The league phase fixtures were announced on 29 August.

Pos	Team	Pld	W	D	L	GF	GA	GD	Pts	Qualification
9	(Belgium) Club Brugge	4	3	0	1	11	7	+4	9	Advance to knockout phase play-offs (seeded)
10	(Portugal) Sporting CP	4	3	0	1	8	4	+4	9	Advance to knockout phase play-offs (seeded)
11	(Spain) Real Betis	4	3	0	1	8	6	+2	9	Advance to knockout phase play-offs (seeded)
12	(Germany) Borussia Dortmund	4	3	0	1	7	5	+2	9	Advance to knockout phase play-offs (seeded)
13	(Germany) Bayern Munich	4	2	2	0	12	5	+7	8	Advance to knockout phase play-offs (seeded)

Updated to match(es) played on 4 November 2026. Source: UEFA
Rules for classification: League phase tiebreakers

Overall								Home						Away					
Pld	W	D	L	GF	GA	GD	Pts	W	D	L	GF	GA	GD	W	D	L	GF	GA	GD
4	3	0	1	8	6	+2	9	2	0	0	4	2	+2	1	0	1	4	4	0

Last updated: 4 November 2026.
Source: UEFA

Round	1	2	3	4	5	6	7	8
Ground	H	A	H	A	H	A	A	H
Result	W	W	W	L				
Position	9	9	5	11				

Updated to match(es) played on 4 November 2026. Source: UEFA
A = Away; H = Home; W = Win; D = Draw; L = Loss

8 September 2026 1	Lille (France)	2–3	(Spain) Real Betis	Villeneuve-d'Ascq, France
21:00 CEST (UTC+2)	Ueda 12'; Alexsandro 36'; Mbappé (red card) 56'; Giroud (yellow card) 90+4'	Report	Bartra 33', 49'; Parrott 53'; Natan (yellow card) 56'; Bernal (yellow card) 61'; Roca (yellow card) 71'	Stadium: Stade Pierre-Mauroy; Attendance: 38,587; Referee: Georgi Kabakov (Bulgaria)

14 October 2026 2	Real Betis (Spain)	3–2	(Portugal) Porto	Seville, Spain
21:00 CEST (UTC+2)	Ezzalzouli 47', (yellow card) 56'; Deossa (yellow card) 56'; Hernández 74'; Ceballos (yellow card) 77'; Isco 84'; Ortiz (yellow card) 90+3'	Report	Veiga 54'; Silva (yellow card) 56'; Aghehowa 61'; Varela (yellow card) 73'; Giménez (yellow card) 86'	Stadium: La Cartuja; Attendance: 67,114; Referee: Clément Turpin (France)

21 October 2026 3	Real Betis (Spain)	1–0	(Netherlands) Feyenoord	Seville, Spain
21:00 CEST (UTC+2)	Isco 59' (pen.); Riquelme (yellow card) 86'	Report	Mármol (yellow card) 14'; Vanhoutte (yellow card) 52'	Stadium: La Cartuja; Attendance: 67,524; Referee: Simone Sozza (Italy)

4 November 2026 4	Borussia Dortmund (Germany)	2–1	(Spain) Real Betis	Dortmund, Germany
21:00 CET (UTC+1)	Ryerson (yellow card) 38'; Bensebaini (yellow card) 45+4'; Silva 49'; Karetsas 72'; Veerman (yellow card) 78'; Bellingham (yellow card) 79'	Report	Natan (yellow card) 44'; Gómez (yellow card) 64'; Ruibal 67'; Ortiz (yellow card) 88'; Isco (yellow card) 90+3'	Stadium: Westfalenstadion; Attendance: 81,365; Referee: Serdar Gözübüyük (Netherlands)

24 November 2026 5	Slovan Bratislava (Slovakia)	v	(Spain) Real Betis	Bratislava, Slovakia
21:00 CET (UTC+1)		Report		Stadium: Tehelné pole

9 December 2026 6	Real Betis (Spain)	v	(Italy) Como	Seville, Spain
18:45 CET (UTC+1)		Report		Stadium: La Cartuja

20 January 2027 7	Real Betis (Spain)	v	(England) Arsenal	Seville, Spain
21:00 CET (UTC+1)		Report		Stadium: La Cartuja

27 January 2027 8	Bayern Munich (Germany)	v	(Spain) Real Betis	Munich, Germany
21:00 CET (UTC+1)		Report		Stadium: Allianz Arena
