= Salim El Jebari =

Spanish-Moroccan footballer (born 2004)

Personal information
- Full name: Salim El Jebari El Hannouni
- Date of birth: 5 February 2004 (age 22)
- Place of birth: Madrid, Spain
- Height: 1.78 m (5 ft 10 in)
- Position: Forward

Team information
- Current team: Córdoba

Youth career
- Rayo Vallecano
- 2018–2023: Atlético Madrid

Senior career*
Years	Team	Apps	(Gls)
2022–2025	Atlético Madrid B	40	(5)
2024–2026	Atlético Madrid	1	(0)
2025	→ Cartagena (loan)	16	(2)
2025–2026	→ Mirandés (loan)	33	(1)
2026–	Córdoba	0	(0)

International career^{‡}
- Morocco U17
2022	Spain U18	4	(1)
2023–	Morocco U20	3	(1)
2023–	Morocco U23	1	(0)
- * Club domestic league appearances and goals as of 9 June 2026 ‡ National team caps and goals as of 17 November 2023

Salim El Jebari El Hannouni (born 5 February 2004) is a professional footballer who currently plays as a forward for Spanish club Córdoba CF. Born in Spain, he has represented Morocco at youth international level.

== Club career ==
=== Early career ===
Born in Madrid to Moroccan parents, El Jebari started his career with Rayo Vallecano, before joining Atlético Madrid in 2018.

=== Atlético Madrid ===
El Jebari signed his first professional deal with the Atlético Madrid two years after joining, and then signed a three-year extension in March 2022. El Jebari appeared in the Atlético Madrid B team in January 2022, making his debut in a 2–0 Tercera Federación win against Parla.

On 4 June 2023, El Jebari was selected for Atlético Madrid's senior squad and was an unused substitute for their La Liga fixture against Villarreal CF (a 2-2 draw). He made his first team debut the following 9 March, replacing Koke in a 2–0 away loss to Cádiz CF.

==== Loans to Cartagena and Mirandés ====
On 24 January 2025, El Jebari was loaned to Segunda División side FC Cartagena until the end of the season. On 26 August, after suffering relegation, he moved to fellow second division side CD Mirandés also in a temporary deal.

=== Córdoba ===
On 4 July 2026, El Jebari signed a two-year contract with Córdoba CF still in division two.

== International career ==
Eligible to represent both Spain and Morocco, El Jebari played for the under-17 side of Morocco before a short stint with Spain's under-18 side in 2022, scoring once against Denmark before going on to make three further appearances.

In February 2023, he refused a call-up to the Spain under-19 team, being replaced in the squad by teammate Adrián Niño. In May of the same year, he explained his decision, stating that he felt a sense of belonging in the Morocco camp and dreamed to represent them at full international level.

El Jebari was called up to the Morocco national under-20 football team for the Maurice Revello Tournament 2023.

== Career statistics ==
=== Club ===
As of match played 9 March 2024

Appearances and goals by club, season and competition
Club	Season	League			Cup		Other		Total	
Club	Season	Division	Apps	Goals	Apps	Goals	Apps	Goals	Apps	Goals
Atlético Madrid B	2021–22	Tercera Federación	1	0	–		0	0	1	0
Atlético Madrid B	2023–24	Primera Federación	23	3	–		0	0	23	3
Atlético Madrid B	Total		24	3	–		0	0	24	3
Atlético Madrid	2023–24	La Liga	1	0	0	0	0	0	1	0
Career total			25	3	0	0	0	0	25	3
