= 2023–24 Atlético Madrid season =

117th season in existence of Atlético Madrid

Atlético Madrid
2023–24 season
- President: Enrique Cerezo
- Head coach: Diego Simeone
- Stadium: Cívitas Metropolitano
- La Liga: 4th
- Copa del Rey: Semi-finals
- Supercopa de España: Semi-finals
- UEFA Champions League: Quarter-finals
- Top goalscorer: League: Antoine Griezmann (16); All: Antoine Griezmann (24)
- Average home league attendance: 59,731
- Biggest win: 7–0 vs Rayo Vallecano (A)
- Biggest defeat: 0–3 vs Valencia (A) vs Athletic Bilbao (A) vs Barcelona (H); 1–4 vs Osasuna (H)
Home colours	Away colours	Third colours

The 2023–24 season was the 117th season in the history of Atlético Madrid and their 22nd consecutive season in the top flight. The club participated in La Liga, the Copa del Rey, the Supercopa de España and the UEFA Champions League.

== Kits ==
Home	Home alt	Away	Away alt	Third	Fourth	Special
Goalkeeper 1	Goalkeeper 2	Goalkeeper 3

== Players ==
=== First-team squad ===
As of 21 April 2024.

Note: Flags indicate national team as defined under FIFA eligibility rules; some limited exceptions apply. Players may hold more than one non-FIFA nationality.

No.	Pos.	Nation	Player
1	GK	ROU	Horațiu Moldovan
2	DF	URU	José Giménez (3rd captain)
3	DF	ESP	César Azpilicueta
4	DF	BRA	Gabriel Paulista
5	MF	ARG	Rodrigo De Paul
6	MF	ESP	Koke (captain)
7	FW	FRA	Antoine Griezmann
8	MF	ESP	Saúl
9	FW	NED	Memphis Depay
10	FW	ARG	Ángel Correa
11	MF	FRA	Thomas Lemar
12	MF	BRA	Samuel Lino
13	GK	SLO	Jan Oblak (vice-captain)

No.	Pos.	Nation	Player
14	MF	ESP	Marcos Llorente
15	DF	MNE	Stefan Savić (4th captain)
16	DF	ARG	Nahuel Molina
17	MF	ESP	Rodrigo Riquelme
18	MF	BEL	Arthur Vermeeren
19	FW	ESP	Álvaro Morata
20	DF	BEL	Axel Witsel
22	DF	ESP	Mario Hermoso
23	DF	MOZ	Reinildo Mandava
24	MF	ESP	Pablo Barrios
27	DF	GRE	Ilias Kostis
30	FW	MAR	Salim El Jebari
39	FW	MAR	Abde Raihani

=== Out on loan ===
Note: Flags indicate national team as defined under FIFA eligibility rules; some limited exceptions apply. Players may hold more than one non-FIFA nationality.

No.	Pos.	Nation	Player

== Transfers ==
=== In ===
Date	Player	From	Type	Fee	Ref.
30 June 2023	(Spain) Manu Sánchez	Osasuna	Loan return		
30 June 2023	(Brazil) Renan Lodi	(England) Nottingham Forest	Loan return		
30 June 2023	(Spain) Sergio Camus	(Canada) Atlético Ottawa	Loan return		
30 June 2023	(Spain) Javi Serrano	Ibiza	Loan return		
30 June 2023	(Uruguay) Juan Manuel Sanabria	(Mexico) Atlético San Luis	Loan return		
30 June 2023	(Argentina) Giuliano Simeone	Zaragoza	Loan return		
30 June 2023	(Spain) Vitolo	Las Palmas	Loan return		
30 June 2023	(Portugal) João Félix	(England) Chelsea	Loan return		
30 June 2023	(Spain) Rodrigo Riquelme	Girona	Loan return		
30 June 2023	(Spain) Borja Garcés	Tenerife	Loan return		
30 June 2023	(Spain) Cedric Teguia	Córdoba	Loan return		
30 June 2023	(Spain) Germán Valera	Andorra	Loan return		
30 June 2023	(Spain) Sergio Camello	Rayo Vallecano	Loan return		
30 June 2023	(Spain) Víctor Mollejo	Zaragoza	Loan return		
30 June 2023	(Brazil) Samuel Lino	Valencia	Loan return		
30 June 2023	(Brazil) Matheus Cunha	(England) Wolverhampton Wanderers	Loan return		
3 July 2023	(Spain) Javi Galán	Celta Vigo	Transfer	€5M	
5 July 2023	(Turkey) Çağlar Söyüncü	(England) Leicester City	Transfer	Free	
6 July 2023	(Spain) César Azpilicueta	(England) Chelsea	Transfer	Free	
6 July 2023	(Uruguay) Santiago Mouriño	(Uruguay) Racing Montevideo	Transfer	€2.7M	
21 August 2023	(Spain) Samu Omorodion	Granada	Transfer	€6M	
31 December 2023	(Spain) Diego Espejo	(Canada) Atlético Ottawa	Loan return		
31 December 2023	(Brazil) Marcos Paulo	(Brazil) São Paulo	Loan return		
24 January 2024	(Romania) Horațiu Moldovan	(Romania) Rapid București	Transfer	€0.8M	
26 January 2024	(Belgium) Arthur Vermeeren	(Belgium) Antwerp	Transfer	€22M	
31 January 2024	(Brazil) Gabriel Paulista	Valencia	Transfer	Free	

=== Out ===
Date	Player	To	Type	Fee	Ref.
30 June 2023	(Spain) Sergio Reguilón	(England) Tottenham Hotspur	End of loan		
30 June 2023	(Republic of Ireland) Matt Doherty	(England) Wolverhampton Wanderers	Released		
30 June 2023	(Central African Republic) Geoffrey Kondogbia	(France) Marseille	Transfer	€8M	
30 June 2023	(Spain) Javi Serrano	(Austria) Sturm Graz	Loan		
1 July 2023	(Brazil) Matheus Cunha	(England) Wolverhampton Wanderers	Transfer	€51.216M	
3 July 2023	(Spain) Manu Sánchez	Celta Vigo	Transfer		
5 July 2023	(Spain) Sergio Camus	Unionistas de Salamanca	Transfer		
5 July 2023	(Uruguay) Juan Manuel Sanabria	(Mexico) Atlético San Luis	Transfer		
14 July 2023	(Brazil) Renan Lodi	(France) Marseille	Transfer	€14M	
21 July 2023	(Argentina) Giuliano Simeone	Alavés	Loan		
3 August 2023	(Spain) Víctor Mollejo	Zaragoza	Loan		
4 August 2023	(Spain) Carlos Martín	Mirandés	Loan		
8 August 2023	(Spain) Germán Valera	Zaragoza	Loan		
11 August 2023	(Uruguay) Santiago Mouriño	Zaragoza	Loan		
17 August 2023	(Spain) Sergio Camello	Rayo Vallecano	Transfer	€4M	
26 August 2023	(Spain) Samu Omorodion	Alavés	Loan		
30 August 2023	(Spain) Cedric Teguia	Ceuta	Transfer		
1 September 2023	(Spain) Borja Garcés	Elche	Loan		
1 September 2023	(Portugal) João Félix	Barcelona	Loan		
5 September 2023	(Belgium) Yannick Carrasco	(Saudi Arabia) Al Shabab	Transfer	€15M	
24 January 2024	(Spain) Javi Galán	Real Sociedad	Loan		
26 January 2024	(Croatia) Ivo Grbić	(England) Sheffield United	Transfer		
29 January 2024	(Turkey) Çağlar Söyüncü	(Turkey) Fenerbahçe	Loan	€2M	

== Pre-season and friendlies ==
Win Draw Loss Fixtures

27 July 2023 Coupang Play Series	Team K League	3–2	Atlético Madrid	Seoul, South Korea
20:00 KST (UTC+9)	Kryvotsyuk 50'; Paločević 89' (pen.); Lee 90+4'	Report	Lemar 13'; Martín 85'	Stadium: Seoul World Cup Stadium; Referee: Kim Hee-gon (South Korea)

30 July 2023 Coupang Play Series	Manchester City	1–2	Atlético Madrid	Seoul, South Korea
20:40 KST (UTC+9)	Gómez (yellow card) 57'; Phillips (yellow card) 76'; Dias 85'	Report	Azpilicueta (yellow card) 15'; Depay 66'; Carrasco 74'; Söyüncü (yellow card) 87'	Stadium: Seoul World Cup Stadium; Attendance: 64,185
Note: The match was delayed by 40 minutes due to heavy rain.

2 August 2023 La Liga Summer Tour	Atlético Madrid	0–0	Real Sociedad	Monterrey, Mexico
19:00 CDT (UTC−5)	Hermoso (yellow card) 33'; Depay (penalty missed) 79'	Report	Zubeldia (yellow card) 14'; Le Normand (yellow card) 33'; Pacheco (yellow card) 54'	Stadium: Estadio BBVA; Attendance: 33,055; Referee: Fernando Hernández Gómez (Mexico)

5 August 2023 La Liga Summer Tour	Atlético Madrid	1–1	Sevilla	San Francisco, United States
19:00 PDT (UTC−7)	Söyüncü (yellow card) 33'; Correa 84'	Report	Jordán (yellow card) 57'; Mir 66'	Stadium: Oracle Park; Referee: Timothy Ford (United States)

24 August 2023 Friendly	Numancia	0–2	Atlético Madrid	Burgo de Osma
19:30 CEST (UTC+2)	Ela (yellow card) 25'; Gning (yellow card) 45'		Moreno (yellow card) 7'; Morata 64'; Riquelme 67'	Stadium: Estadio Municipal de El Burgo de Osma; Referee: Javier Alberola Rojas

== Competitions ==
=== Overall record ===
Competition	First match	Last match	Starting round	Final position	Record							
Competition	First match	Last match	Starting round	Final position	Pld	W	D	L	GF	GA	GD	Win %
La Liga	14 August 2023	25 May 2024	Matchday 1	4th	38	24	4	10	70	43	+27	63.16
Copa del Rey	6 January 2024	29 February 2024	Round of 32	Semi-finals	5	3	0	2	8	7	+1	60.00
Supercopa de España	10 January 2024		Semi-finals	Semi-finals	1	0	0	1	3	5	−2	0.00
UEFA Champions League	19 September 2023	16 April 2024	Group stage	Quarter-finals	10	6	2	2	23	13	+10	60.00
Total					54	33	6	15	104	68	+36	61.11

Source: Soccerway

=== La Liga ===
==== League table ====
Pos	Team	Pld	W	D	L	GF	GA	GD	Pts	Qualification or relegation
2	Barcelona	38	26	7	5	79	44	+35	85	Qualification for the Champions League league phase
3	Girona	38	25	6	7	85	46	+39	81	Qualification for the Champions League league phase
4	Atlético Madrid	38	24	4	10	70	43	+27	76	Qualification for the Champions League league phase
5	Athletic Bilbao	38	19	11	8	61	37	+24	68	Qualification for the Europa League league phase (Note: Since the winners of the 2023–24 Copa del Rey, Athletic Bilbao, qualified for European competition based on league position, the Europa League berth awarded to the Copa del Rey winners was passed to the sixth-placed team, and the Conference League berth awarded to the sixth-placed team was passed to the seventh-placed team.)
6	Real Sociedad	38	16	12	10	51	39	+12	60	Qualification for the Europa League league phase

Source: LaLiga EA Sports
Rules for classification: 1) Points; 2) Head-to-head points; 3) Head-to-head goal difference; 4) Goal difference; 5) Goals scored; 6) Fair-play points
(Note: Head-to-head record is used only after all the matches between the teams in question have been played)

==== Results summary ====
Overall								Home						Away					
Pld	W	D	L	GF	GA	GD	Pts	W	D	L	GF	GA	GD	W	D	L	GF	GA	GD
38	24	4	10	70	43	+27	76	16	1	2	42	22	+20	8	3	8	28	21	+7

Source: La Liga

==== Results by round ====
Round	1	2	3	4	5	6	7	8	9	10	11	12	13	14	15	16	17	18	19	20	21	22	23	24	25	26	27	28	29	30	31	32	33	34	35	36	37	38
Ground	H	A	A	H	A	H	A	H	H	A	H	A	H	H	A	H	A	H	A	H	A	H	A	A	H	A	H	A	H	A	H	A	H	A	H	A	H	A
Result	W	D	W	W	L	W	W	W	W	W	W	L	W	W	L	W	L	D	L	W	W	W	D	L	W	D	W	L	L	W	W	L	W	W	W	W	L	W
Position	1	5	2	4	7	5	5	4	4	4	3	4	4	3	4	3	4	4	5	5	4	4	4	4	4	4	4	4	5	4	4	4	4	4	4	4	4	4

Source: La Liga
A = Away; H = Home; W = Win; D = Draw; L = Loss

==== Matches ====
The league fixtures were announced on 22 June 2023.

14 August 2023 1	Atlético Madrid	3–1	Granada	Madrid
21:30 CEST (UTC+2)	Hermoso (yellow card) 39'; Morata (yellow card) 42', (goal) 45+4'; Depay 67'; Azpilicueta (yellow card) 90+4'; Llorente 90+8'	Report	Gumbau (yellow card) 10'; Omorodion 62'	Stadium: Cívitas Metropolitano; Attendance: 56,164; Referee: Juan Luis Pulido Santana

20 August 2023 2	Real Betis	0–0	Atlético Madrid	Seville
21:30 CEST (UTC+2)	Ruibal (yellow card) 38'; Isco (yellow card) 51'	Report	Savić (yellow card) 43'	Stadium: Benito Villamarín; Attendance: 51,782; Referee: Ricardo de Burgos Bengoetxea

28 August 2023 3	Rayo Vallecano	0–7	Atlético Madrid	Madrid
21:30 CEST (UTC+2)	Palazón (yellow card) 39'; Lejeune (yellow card) 64'; Espino (yellow card) 81'; Balliu (yellow card) 88'	Report	Griezmann 2', (yellow card) 75'; Depay 16'; Molina 36'; Barrios (yellow card) 49'; Morata 73', 84'; Correa 79'; Llorente 86'; Hermoso (yellow card) 87'	Stadium: Campo de Fútbol de Vallecas; Attendance: 13,966; Referee: José Luis Munuera Montero

16 September 2023 5	Valencia	3–0	Atlético Madrid	Valencia
16:15 CEST (UTC+2)	Duro 5', 34'; Guerra 54'; Mamardashvili (yellow card) 56'	Report	Hermoso (yellow card) 23'; Llorente (yellow card) 36'; Griezmann (yellow card) 37'; Saúl (yellow card) 74'; Barrios (yellow card) 86'	Stadium: Mestalla; Attendance: 45,363; Referee: Jesús Gil Manzano

24 September 2023 6	Atlético Madrid	3–1	Real Madrid	Madrid
21:00 CEST (UTC+2)	Morata 4', 46'; Griezmann 18'; Giménez (yellow card) 45+1'	Report	Kroos 35'; Modrić (yellow card) 45'; Mendy (yellow card) 67'; Bellingham (yellow card) 90+5'	Stadium: Cívitas Metropolitano; Attendance: 69,082; Referee: Javier Alberola Rojas

28 September 2023 7	Osasuna	0–2	Atlético Madrid	Pamplona
21:30 CEST (UTC+2)	Catena (yellow card) 54'; Oroz (yellow card) 76'; Ávila (red card) 85'; Fernández (yellow card) 90'	Report	Griezmann 20'; Riquelme 81'; Morata (yellow card) 84' (yellow-red card) 85'	Stadium: El Sadar; Attendance: 20,192; Referee: Juan Martínez Munuera

1 October 2023 8	Atlético Madrid	3–2	Cádiz	Madrid
21:00 CEST (UTC+2)	Koke (yellow card) 14'; Correa 32', 66'; Molina 46'	Report	Lucas Pires 12'; Roger 27', (yellow card) 39'; Sobrino (yellow card) 90+2'; Kouamé (yellow card) 90+3'	Stadium: Cívitas Metropolitano; Attendance: 53,421; Referee: Javier Iglesias Villanueva

8 October 2023 9	Atlético Madrid	2–1	Real Sociedad	Madrid
16:15 CEST (UTC+2)	Lino 22'; Koke (yellow card) 48'; Griezmann 89' (pen.), (yellow card) 90+6'; Galán (yellow card) 90+7'	Report	Le Normand (yellow card) 15'; Oyarzabal 73'; Traoré (yellow card) 86'; Fernández (yellow card) 87'	Stadium: Cívitas Metropolitano; Attendance: 65,607; Referee: José Luis Munuera Montero

21 October 2023 10	Celta Vigo	0–3	Atlético Madrid	Vigo
21:00 CEST (UTC+2)	Villar (red card) 25'; Mingueza (yellow card) 30'; Starfelt (yellow card) 51'; Rodríguez (yellow card) 87'	Report	Griezmann 29' (pen.), 64', 70'; Saúl (yellow card) 54'; Riquelme (yellow card) 87'	Stadium: Balaídos; Attendance: 20,282; Referee: Guillermo Cuadra Fernández

29 October 2023 11	Atlético Madrid	2–1	Alavés	Madrid
21:00 CET (UTC+1)	Riquelme 26'; Morata 45+1'; Llorente (yellow card) 71'; Hermoso (yellow card) 73'; Oblak (yellow card) 73'	Report	Duarte (yellow card) 72'; Hagi (yellow card) 85'; Guevara 90+6'	Stadium: Cívitas Metropolitano; Attendance: 50,009; Referee: Alejandro Muñiz Ruiz

3 November 2023 12	Las Palmas	2–1	Atlético Madrid	Las Palmas
21:00 CET (UTC+1)	Rodríguez 51'; Benito 75'	Report	De Paul (yellow card) 62'; Morata 83'; Giménez (yellow card) 90+3'; Savić (yellow card) 90+9'	Stadium: Estadio Gran Canaria; Attendance: 30,080; Referee: Mario Melero López

12 November 2023 13	Atlético Madrid	3–1	Villarreal	Madrid
21:00 CET (UTC+1)	Witsel 45+1'; Griezmann 80'; Lino 85'	Report	Gerard 20'; Capoue (yellow card) 45+2'; Akhomach (yellow card) 77'	Stadium: Cívitas Metropolitano; Attendance: 56,632; Referee: Francisco José Hernández Maeso

25 November 2023 14	Atlético Madrid	1–0	Mallorca	Madrid
21:00 CET (UTC+1)	Griezmann 64'	Report		Stadium: Cívitas Metropolitano; Attendance: 58,119; Referee: Juan Martínez Munuera

3 December 2023 15	Barcelona	1–0	Atlético Madrid	Barcelona
21:00 CET (UTC+1)	Félix 28', (yellow card) 50'; Torres (yellow card) 78'; Araújo (yellow card) 79'; Cancelo (yellow card) 88'; De Jong (yellow card) 90+3'	Report	Giménez (yellow card) 31'; Witsel (yellow card) 34'; Koke (yellow card) 38'; Azpilicueta (yellow card) 47'	Stadium: Estadi Olímpic Lluís Companys; Attendance: 34,568; Referee: José María Sánchez Martínez

10 December 2023 16	Atlético Madrid	2–1	Almería	Madrid
14:00 CET (UTC+1)	Morata 17'; Correa 22'; Koke (yellow card) 90+1'	Report	Baptistão 62'	Stadium: Cívitas Metropolitano; Attendance: 55,473; Referee: Ricardo de Burgos Bengoetxea

16 December 2023 17	Athletic Bilbao	2–0	Atlético Madrid	Bilbao
16:15 CET (UTC+1)	Sancet (penalty missed) 36'; Guruzeta 51'; N. Williams 64'	Report	De Paul (yellow card) 49'	Stadium: San Mamés; Attendance: 48,781; Referee: Jesús Gil Manzano

19 December 2023 18	Atlético Madrid	3–3	Getafe	Madrid
21:30 CET (UTC+1)	Savić (yellow card) 15' (yellow-red card) 38'; Griezmann 44', 69' (pen.); Morata 63'; Hermoso (yellow card) 90'	Report	Milla (yellow card) 52'; Mayoral 53', 90+3' (pen.); Suárez (yellow card) 68'; Óscar (yellow card) 82', (goal) 87'	Stadium: Cívitas Metropolitano; Attendance: 46,401; Referee: José Luis Munuera Montero

23 December 2023 4	Atlético Madrid	1–0	Sevilla	Madrid
16:15 CET (UTC+1)	Molina (yellow card) 27'; Giménez (yellow card) 38'; Llorente 46', (yellow card) 90+4'; Söyüncü (red card) 70'; Correa (yellow card) 77'; Witsel (yellow card) 77'; De Paul (yellow card) 85'; Azpilicueta (yellow card) 90'	Report	Suso (yellow card) 43'; Salas (yellow card) 68'; Ramos (yellow card) 83'	Stadium: Cívitas Metropolitano; Attendance: 64,308; Referee: Javier Alberola Rojas
Note: The match was originally scheduled for 3 September 2023, but was postponed due to flash floods.

3 January 2024 19	Girona	4–3	Atlético Madrid	Girona
21:30 CET (UTC+1)	Valery 2'; Sávio 26'; Blind 39'; Martín 90+1'	Report	Morata 14', 44', 54'; Hermoso (yellow card) 90'	Stadium: Montilivi; Attendance: 13,804; Referee: Alejandro Hernández Hernández

22 January 2024 21	Granada	0–1	Atlético Madrid	Granada
21:00 CET (UTC+1)	Boyé (yellow card) 75'; Batalla (yellow card) 90+5'	Report	Morata 54'; Saúl (yellow card) 72'; Savić (yellow card) 75'	Stadium: Nuevo Los Cármenes; Attendance: 18,704; Referee: Juan Martínez Munuera

28 January 2024 22	Atlético Madrid	2–0	Valencia	Madrid
16:15 CET (UTC+1)	Molina (yellow card) 48'; Lino 45+5'; Depay 57'; Saúl (yellow card) 83'	Report		Stadium: Cívitas Metropolitano; Attendance: 59,493; Referee: Ricardo de Burgos Bengoetxea

31 January 2024 20	Atlético Madrid	2–1	Rayo Vallecano	Madrid
21:00 CET (UTC+1)	Mandava 35'; Depay 90'	Report	Pérez (yellow card) 35'; García 42'; Palazón (yellow card) 60'; Chavarría (yellow card) 90+7'	Stadium: Cívitas Metropolitano; Attendance: 47,003; Referee: César Soto Grado
Note: The match date was pushed back due to Atlético Madrid's involvement in the Supercopa de España.

4 February 2024 23	Real Madrid	1–1	Atlético Madrid	Madrid
21:00 CET (UTC+1)	Brahim 20'	Report	Saúl (yellow card) 37'; Hermoso (yellow card) 38'; Koke (yellow card) 82'; Barrios (yellow card) 85'; Llorente 90+3'; Depay (yellow card) 90+5'	Stadium: Santiago Bernabéu; Attendance: 76,732; Referee: José María Sánchez Martínez

11 February 2024 24	Sevilla	1–0	Atlético Madrid	Seville
18:30 CET (UTC+1)	Romero 15'; Suso (yellow card) 70'; En-Nesyri (yellow card) 77'	Report	Witsel (yellow card) 26'	Stadium: Ramón Sánchez Pizjuán; Attendance: 31,528; Referee: Javier Iglesias Villanueva

17 February 2024 25	Atlético Madrid	5–0	Las Palmas	Madrid
14:00 CET (UTC+1)	Llorente 15', 20'; Molina (yellow card) 28'; Saúl (yellow card) 33'; Correa 47', 62' (pen.); Depay 87'	Report	Perrone (yellow card) 4'	Stadium: Cívitas Metropolitano; Attendance: 61,196; Referee: Jorge Figueroa Vázquez

24 February 2024 26	Almería	2–2	Atlético Madrid	Almería
21:00 CET (UTC+1)	Romero 27', 64'; Embarba (yellow card) 90+3'	Report	Correa 2'; Mandava (yellow card) 40'; De Paul 57'	Stadium: Estadio de los Juegos Mediterráneos; Attendance: 14,472; Referee: Javier Alberola Rojas

3 March 2024 27	Atlético Madrid	2–1	Real Betis	Madrid
16:15 CET (UTC+1)	Silva 8' (o.g.); De Paul (yellow card) 18'; Morata (penalty missed) 28', 44'	Report	Carvalho 62'; Pezzella (yellow card) 67'; Rodríguez (yellow card) 85'	Stadium: Cívitas Metropolitano; Attendance: 61,901; Referee: César Soto Grado

9 March 2024 28	Cádiz	2–0	Atlético Madrid	Cádiz
16:15 CET (UTC+1)	Juanmi 24', 64', (yellow card) 31'; Sobrino (yellow card) 48'; Alcaraz (yellow card) 72'; Alejo (yellow card) 90'	Report	Depay (yellow card) 30'; Molina (yellow card) 52'; Morata (yellow card) 62'; Vermeeren (yellow card) 84'; Llorente (yellow card) 88'	Stadium: Nuevo Mirandilla; Attendance: 15,917; Referee: Pablo González Fuertes

17 March 2024 29	Atlético Madrid	0–3	Barcelona	Madrid
21:00 CET (UTC+1)	De Paul (yellow card) 46'; Savić (yellow card) 61'; Barrios (yellow card) 89'; Molina (red card) 90+3'	Report	Koundé (yellow card) 33'; Félix 38'; Lewandowski 47'; López 65'	Stadium: Cívitas Metropolitano; Attendance: 68,253; Referee: José María Sánchez Martínez

1 April 2024 30	Villarreal	1–2	Atlético Madrid	Villarreal
21:00 CEST (UTC+2)	Capoue (yellow card) 27'; Sørloth 50'; Parejo (yellow card) 58'; Mosquera (yellow card) 90+4'	Report	Witsel 9'; Griezmann (yellow card) 26'; Barrios (yellow card) 62'; Saúl 87', (yellow card) 90+2'	Stadium: Estadio de la Cerámica; Attendance: 19,679; Referee: Mario Melero López

13 April 2024 31	Atlético Madrid	3–1	Girona	Madrid
14:00 CEST (UTC+2)	Saúl (yellow card) 25'; Griezmann 34' (pen.), 50'; Correa (yellow card) 35', (goal) 45+6'; Llorente (yellow card) 90+2'	Report	Dovbyk 4'; Herrera (yellow card) 32'; Couto (yellow card) 70'	Stadium: Cívitas Metropolitano; Attendance: 64,214; Referee: Ricardo de Burgos Bengoetxea

21 April 2024 32	Alavés	2–0	Atlético Madrid	Vitoria-Gasteiz
18:30 CEST (UTC+2)	Guridi (yellow card) 2'; López (yellow card) 6'; Benavídez 15', (yellow card) 49'; Abqar (yellow card) 33'; Marín (yellow card) 68'; Rioja 90+2'	Report	Correa (yellow card) 45'; Azpilicueta (yellow card) 50'; Savić (yellow card) 68'	Stadium: Mendizorrotza; Attendance: 18,719; Referee: Jesús Gil Manzano

27 April 2024 33	Atlético Madrid	3–1	Athletic Bilbao	Madrid
21:00 CEST (UTC+2)	De Paul (yellow card) 5', (goal) 15'; Correa 52'; Simón 80' (o.g.); Hermoso (yellow card) 90+3'; Griezmann (yellow card) 90+4'	Report	N. Williams 45'; Sancet (yellow card) 59'; Paredes (yellow card) 71'	Stadium: Cívitas Metropolitano; Attendance: 64,612; Referee: Juan Martínez Munuera

4 May 2024 34	Mallorca	0–1	Atlético Madrid	Palma
21:00 CEST (UTC+2)	Raíllo (yellow card) 71'; Muriqi (yellow card) 75'	Report	Riquelme 5'	Stadium: Estadi Mallorca Son Moix; Attendance: 20,519; Referee: Javier Alberola Rojas

12 May 2024 35	Atlético Madrid	1–0	Celta Vigo	Madrid
16:15 CEST (UTC+2)	Witsel (yellow card) 72'; De Paul 84'	Report	Starfelt (yellow card) 36'	Stadium: Cívitas Metropolitano; Attendance: 63,014; Referee: Jorge Figueroa Vázquez

15 May 2024 36	Getafe	0–3	Atlético Madrid	Getafe
22:00 CEST (UTC+2)	Rico (yellow card) 14'; Alderete (yellow card) 55'; Santiago (yellow card) 88'; Álvarez (yellow card) 90+1'	Report	Witsel (yellow card) 17'; Griezmann 27', 42', 51'; Giménez (yellow card) 77'; Hermoso (yellow card) 88'	Stadium: Coliseum; Attendance: 13,027; Referee: Mario Melero López

19 May 2024 37	Atlético Madrid	1–4	Osasuna	Madrid
19:00 CEST (UTC+2)	Gabriel (yellow card) 35'; Morata 55'; De Paul (yellow card) 56'	Report	Ra. García 26', 64'; Oroz 52'; Catena (yellow card) 59'; Torró 88'; Muñoz (yellow card) 90+3'	Stadium: Cívitas Metropolitano; Attendance: 58,401; Referee: Pablo González Fuertes

25 May 2024 38	Real Sociedad	0–2	Atlético Madrid	San Sebastián
16:15 CEST (UTC+2)	Pacheco (yellow card) 45+2'; Méndez (yellow card) 57'; Olasagasti (yellow card) 90'	Report	Lino 9'; Vermeeren (yellow card) 41'; Koke (yellow card) 45'; Saúl (yellow card) 80' (yellow-red card) 90+1'; Mandava (yellow card) 87', (goal) 90+3'	Stadium: Anoeta; Attendance: 30,678; Referee: José María Sánchez Martínez

=== Copa del Rey ===
Atlético entered the tournament in the round of 32, as they had qualified for the 2023–24 Supercopa de España.

6 January 2024 Round of 32	Lugo	1–3	Atlético Madrid	Lugo
16:00 CET (UTC+1)	Quintana (yellow card) 35'; Antonetti 39'	Report	Correa 2'; Azpilicueta (yellow card) 32'; Depay 66', 74'	Stadium: Anxo Carro; Attendance: 8,168; Referee: Pablo González Fuertes

18 January 2024 Round of 16	Atlético Madrid	4–2 (a.e.t.)	Real Madrid	Madrid
21:30 CET (UTC+1)	Lino 39'; Morata 57', (yellow card) 58'; Hermoso (yellow card) 68'; De Paul (yellow card) 78'; Koke (yellow card) 80'; Griezmann 100', (yellow card) 101'; Witsel (yellow card) 113'; Riquelme 119'	Report	Vinícius (yellow card) 45'; Oblak 45+1' (o.g.); Camavinga (yellow card) 56'; Brahim (yellow card) 68'; Joselu 82'; Tchouaméni (yellow card) 85'; Bellingham (yellow card) 87'; Carvajal (yellow card) 89'	Stadium: Cívitas Metropolitano; Attendance: 67,623; Referee: Guillermo Cuadra Fernández

25 January 2024 Quarter-finals	Atlético Madrid	1–0	Sevilla	Madrid
21:00 CET (UTC+1)	Griezmann (penalty missed) 26'; Giménez (yellow card) 63'; Hermoso (yellow card) 71'; Koke (yellow card) 75'; Depay 79'	Report	Torres (yellow card) 33'; Ramos (yellow card) 39'; Pedrosa (yellow card) 62'; Lamela (yellow card) 73'; Rakitić (yellow card) 82'; Mir (yellow card) 90+8'	Stadium: Cívitas Metropolitano; Attendance: 60,169; Referee: Jesús Gil Manzano

7 February 2024 Semi-finals; First leg	Atlético Madrid	0–1	Athletic Bilbao	Madrid
21:30 CET (UTC+1)	Mandava (yellow card) 23'; De Paul (yellow card) 83'	Report	Berenguer 25' (pen.); Prados (yellow card) 37'; Vivian (yellow card) 45+2'; Gómez (yellow card) 71'; Ruiz de Galarreta (yellow card) 90+7'	Stadium: Cívitas Metropolitano; Attendance: 65,029; Referee: Alejandro Hernández Hernández

29 February 2024 Semi-finals; Second leg	Athletic Bilbao	3–0 (4–0 agg.)	Atlético Madrid	Bilbao
21:30 CET (UTC+1)	I. Williams 13'; Ruiz de Galarreta (yellow card) 40'; N. Williams 42'; Muniain (yellow card) 45+6'; Guruzeta 61'; Lekue (yellow card) 66'; De Marcos (yellow card) 74'	Report	Hermoso (yellow card) 28'	Stadium: San Mamés; Attendance: 52,061; Referee: Juan Martínez Munuera

=== Supercopa de España ===
10 January 2024 Semi-finals	Real Madrid	5–3 (a.e.t.)	Atlético Madrid	Riyadh, Saudi Arabia
22:00 SAST (UTC+3)	Rüdiger 20'; Mendy 29'; Carvajal 85'; Joselu 116'; Brahim 120+2', (yellow card) 120+3'	Report	Hermoso 6'; Griezmann 37'; Rüdiger 78' (o.g.)	Stadium: KSU Stadium; Attendance: 23,982; Referee: Javier Alberola Rojas

=== UEFA Champions League ===
==== Group stage ====
The draw for the group stage was held on 31 August 2023.

Pos	Team	Pld	W	D	L	GF	GA	GD	Pts	Qualification	ATM	LAZ	FEY	CEL
1	(Spain) Atlético Madrid	6	4	2	0	17	6	+11	14	Advance to knockout phase	—	2–0	3–2	6–0
2	(Italy) Lazio	6	3	1	2	7	7	0	10	Advance to knockout phase	1–1	—	1–0	2–0
3	(Netherlands) Feyenoord	6	2	0	4	9	10	−1	6	Transfer to Europa League	1–3	3–1	—	2–0
4	(Scotland) Celtic	6	1	1	4	5	15	−10	4		2–2	1–2	2–1	—

Source: UEFA
Rules for classification: Group stage tiebreakers

19 September 2023 1	Lazio (Italy)	1–1	(Spain) Atlético Madrid	Rome, Italy
21:00 CEST (UTC+2)	Patric (yellow card) 83'; Immobile (yellow card) 84'; Provedel 90+5'	Report	Griezmann (yellow card) 26'; Lino (yellow card) 67'; Barrios 29'; Correa (yellow card) 90+4'	Stadium: Stadio Olimpico; Attendance: 46,168; Referee: Slavko Vinčić (Slovenia)

4 October 2023 2	Atlético Madrid (Spain)	3–2	(Netherlands) Feyenoord	Madrid, Spain
18:45 CEST (UTC+2)	Morata 12', 47', (yellow card) 45+1'; Azpilicueta (yellow card) 33'; Saúl (yellow card) 41'; Griezmann 45+4'; Lino (yellow card) 56'	Report	Hermoso 7' (o.g.); Hancko 34'; Stengs (yellow card) 53'	Stadium: Cívitas Metropolitano; Attendance: 61,742; Referee: François Letexier (France)

25 October 2023 3	Celtic (Scotland)	2–2	(Spain) Atlético Madrid	Glasgow, Scotland
20:00 BST (UTC+1)	Furuhashi 4'; Palma 28', (yellow card) 51'; Carter-Vickers (yellow card) 30'; Taylor (yellow card) 59'	Report	Griezmann (penalty missed) 25', 25'; De Paul (yellow card) 34' (yellow-red card) 82'; Galán (yellow card) 38'; Molina (yellow card) 45+4'; Morata 53'; Savić (yellow card) 82'	Stadium: Celtic Park; Attendance: 55,844; Referee: Felix Zwayer (Germany)

7 November 2023 4	Atlético Madrid (Spain)	6–0	(Scotland) Celtic	Madrid, Spain
18:45 CET (UTC+1)	Griezmann 6', 60'; Morata 45+2', 76'; Lino 66'; Saúl 84'; Söyüncü (yellow card) 90'	Report	Maeda (red card) 23'; Palma (yellow card) 36'	Stadium: Cívitas Metropolitano; Attendance: 60,863; Referee: Ivan Kružliak (Slovakia)

28 November 2023 5	Feyenoord (Netherlands)	1–3	(Spain) Atlético Madrid	Rotterdam, Netherlands
21:00 CET (UTC+1)	Wieffer 77'	Report	Geertruida 14' (o.g.); Hermoso 57'; Giménez 81' (o.g.)	Stadium: De Kuip; Attendance: 43,992; Referee: Anthony Taylor (England)

13 December 2023 6	Atlético Madrid (Spain)	2–0	(Italy) Lazio	Madrid, Spain
21:00 CET (UTC+1)	Griezmann 6'; Giménez (yellow card) 45+2'; Lino 51'	Report	Pedro (yellow card) 8'; Marušić (yellow card) 47'; Guendouzi (yellow card) 72'	Stadium: Cívitas Metropolitano; Attendance: 63,574; Referee: Serdar Gözübüyük (Netherlands)

==== Knockout phase ====
===== Round of 16 =====
The draw for the round of 16 was held on 18 December 2023.

20 February 2024 First leg	Inter Milan (Italy)	1–0	(Spain) Atlético Madrid	Milan, Italy
21:00 CET (UTC+1)	Arnautović 79'; Frattesi (yellow card) 86'; Carlos Augusto (yellow card) 90+4'	Report	Hermoso (yellow card) 53'; Savić (yellow card) 82'; Morata (yellow card) 84'; Koke (yellow card) 90+2'	Stadium: San Siro; Attendance: 73,709; Referee: István Kovács (Romania)

13 March 2024 Second leg	Atlético Madrid (Spain)	2–1 (a.e.t.) (2–2 agg.) (3–2 p)	(Italy) Inter Milan	Madrid, Spain
21:00 CET (UTC+1)	Griezmann 35'; Hermoso (yellow card) 41'; Depay 87'; Koke (yellow card) 90'	Report	Dimarco 33'; Çalhanoğlu (yellow card) 104'; Acerbi (yellow card) 105+2'; Bisseck (yellow card) 118'	Stadium: Cívitas Metropolitano; Attendance: 69,196; Referee: Szymon Marciniak (Poland)
	Penalties
	Depay (penalty scored); Saúl (penalty missed); Riquelme (penalty scored); Correa (penalty scored)		(penalty scored) Çalhanoğlu; (penalty missed) Sánchez; (penalty missed) Klaassen; (penalty scored) Acerbi; (penalty missed) Martínez

===== Quarter-finals =====
The draw for the quarter-finals was held on 15 March 2024.

10 April 2024 First leg	Atlético Madrid (Spain)	2–1	(Germany) Borussia Dortmund	Madrid, Spain
21:00 CEST (UTC+2)	De Paul 4'; Lino (yellow card) 27', (goal) 32'; Llorente (yellow card) 28'; Giménez (yellow card) 75'	Report	Can (yellow card) 24'; Maatsen (yellow card) 53'; Haller 81'	Stadium: Cívitas Metropolitano; Attendance: 68,641; Referee: Marco Guida (Italy)

16 April 2024 Second leg	Borussia Dortmund (Germany)	4–2 (5–4 agg.)	(Spain) Atlético Madrid	Dortmund, Germany
21:00 CEST (UTC+2)	Brandt 34'; Maatsen 39'; Ryerson (yellow card) 43'; Füllkrug 71'; Sabitzer 74'	Report	Azpilicueta (yellow card) 30'; Hermoso (yellow card) 45+1'; Hummels 49' (o.g.); Correa 64'	Stadium: Signal Iduna Park; Attendance: 81,365; Referee: Slavko Vinčić (Slovenia)

== Statistics ==
=== Squad statistics ===
No.	Pos	Nat	Player	Total		La Liga		Copa del Rey		Supercopa de España		Champions League	
No.	Pos	Nat	Player	Apps	Goals	Apps	Goals	Apps	Goals	Apps	Goals	Apps	Goals
Goalkeepers
1	GK	(Romania) ROU	Horațiu Moldovan	0	0	0	0	0	0	0	0	0	0
13	GK	(Slovenia) SLO	Jan Oblak	54	0	38	0	5	0	1	0	10	0
Defenders
2	DF	(Uruguay) URU	José Giménez	33	0	14+8	0	3	0	1	0	6+1	0
3	DF	(Spain) ESP	César Azpilicueta	34	0	14+11	0	1+1	0	0+1	0	3+3	0
4	DF	(Brazil) BRA	Gabriel Paulista	5	0	5	0	0	0	0	0	0	0
15	DF	(Montenegro) MNE	Stefan Savić	33	0	19+4	0	2+1	0	1	0	4+2	0
16	DF	(Argentina) ARG	Nahuel Molina	46	2	19+11	2	4+1	0	0+1	0	10	0
20	DF	(Belgium) BEL	Axel Witsel	51	2	30+5	2	5	0	0+1	0	10	0
22	DF	(Spain) ESP	Mario Hermoso	45	2	28+3	0	3+1	0	1	1	9	1
23	DF	(Mozambique) MOZ	Reinildo Mandava	19	2	7+9	2	1+1	0	0	0	0+1	0
27	DF	(Greece) GRE	Ilias Kostis	1	0	0	0	0	0	0	0	0+1	0
Midfielders
5	MF	(Argentina) ARG	Rodrigo De Paul	47	4	25+8	3	4+1	0	1	0	8	1
6	MF	(Spain) ESP	Koke	50	0	32+3	0	4+1	0	1	0	8+1	0
8	MF	(Spain) ESP	Saúl	49	2	14+20	1	3+1	0	1	0	5+5	1
11	MF	(France) FRA	Thomas Lemar	3	0	3	0	0	0	0	0	0	0
12	MF	(Brazil) BRA	Samuel Lino	46	8	25+9	4	4	1	1	0	6+1	3
14	MF	(Spain) ESP	Marcos Llorente	52	6	29+8	6	2+3	0	1	0	6+3	0
17	MF	(Spain) ESP	Rodrigo Riquelme	47	4	16+18	3	1+3	1	0+1	0	2+6	0
18	MF	(Belgium) BEL	Arthur Vermeeren	5	0	2+3	0	0	0	0	0	0	0
24	MF	(Spain) ESP	Pablo Barrios	35	1	17+7	0	1+3	0	0	0	2+5	1
Forwards
7	FW	(France) FRA	Antoine Griezmann	48	24	31+2	16	3+1	1	1	1	10	6
9	FW	(Netherlands) NED	Memphis Depay	31	9	9+14	5	2+3	3	0	0	0+3	1
10	FW	(Argentina) ARG	Ángel Correa	47	11	14+18	9	2+2	1	0+1	0	2+8	1
19	FW	(Spain) ESP	Álvaro Morata	48	21	21+11	15	3+2	1	1	0	8+2	5
30	FW	(Morocco) MAR	Salim El Jebari	1	0	0+1	0	0	0	0	0	0	0
39	FW	(Morocco) MAR	Abde Raihani	1	0	0+1	0	0	0	0	0	0	0
Players transferred out during the season
1	GK	(Croatia) CRO	Ivo Grbić	0	0	0	0	0	0	0	0	0	0
4	DF	(Turkey) TUR	Çağlar Söyüncü	9	0	1+5	0	1	0	0	0	0+2	0
17	DF	(Spain) ESP	Javi Galán	9	0	0+5	0	1	0	0+1	0	1+1	0
18	FW	(Portugal) POR	João Félix	0	0	0	0	0	0	0	0	0	0
21	MF	(Belgium) BEL	Yannick Carrasco	3	0	3	0	0	0	0	0	0	0

=== Goalscorers ===
Rank	No.	Pos.	Nat.	Player	La Liga	Copa del Rey	Supercopa de España	Champions League	Total
1	7	FW	(France)	Antoine Griezmann	16	1	1	6	24
2	19	FW	(Spain)	Álvaro Morata	15	1	0	5	21
3	10	FW	(Argentina)	Ángel Correa	9	1	0	1	11
4	9	FW	(Netherlands)	Memphis Depay	5	3	0	1	9
5	12	MF	(Brazil)	Samuel Lino	4	1	0	3	8
6	14	MF	(Spain)	Marcos Llorente	6	0	0	0	6
7	5	MF	(Argentina)	Rodrigo De Paul	3	0	0	1	4
7	17	MF	(Spain)	Rodrigo Riquelme	3	1	0	0	4
9	8	MF	(Spain)	Saúl	1	0	0	1	2
9	16	DF	(Argentina)	Nahuel Molina	2	0	0	0	2
9	20	DF	(Belgium)	Axel Witsel	2	0	0	0	2
9	22	DF	(Spain)	Mario Hermoso	0	0	1	1	2
9	23	DF	(Mozambique)	Reinildo Mandava	2	0	0	0	2
14	24	MF	(Spain)	Pablo Barrios	0	0	0	1	1
Own goals					2	0	1	3	6
Totals					70	8	3	23	104
