= Rodrigo Riquelme (footballer, born 2000) =

Spanish footballer

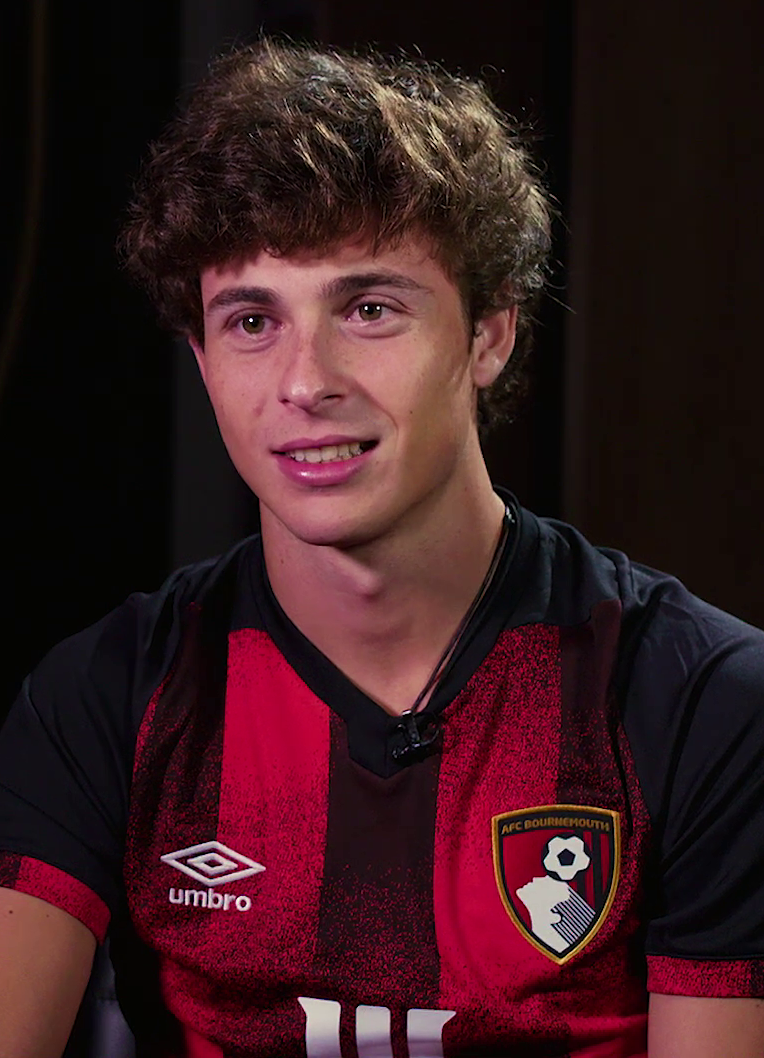
- Riquelme with AFC Bournemouth in 2020

Personal information
- Full name: Rodrigo Riquelme Reche
- Date of birth: 2 April 2000 (age 26)
- Place of birth: Madrid, Spain
- Height: 1.74 m (5 ft 9 in)
- Positions: Winger; attacking midfielder

Team information
- Current team: Betis
- Number: 17

Youth career
- Zaragoza
- Rayo Vallecano
- 2010–2019: Atlético Madrid

Senior career*
Years	Team	Apps	(Gls)
2019–2020	Atlético Madrid B	22	(5)
2019–2025	Atlético Madrid	51	(3)
2020–2021	→ AFC Bournemouth (loan)	16	(1)
2021–2022	→ Mirandés (loan)	36	(7)
2022–2023	→ Girona (loan)	34	(4)
2025–	Betis	37	(4)

International career^{‡}
2022–2023	Spain U21	14	(5)
2023–	Spain	2	(0)
Medal record
Men's football
Representing Spain
UEFA European Under-21 Championship
Runner-up	2023 Georgia–Romania
- * Club domestic league appearances and goals as of 21 November 2026 ‡ National team caps and goals as of 19 November 2023

Rodrigo Riquelme Reche (born 2 April 2000), also known as Roro, is a Spanish professional footballer who plays as a winger or attacking midfielder for La Liga club Real Betis and the Spain national team.

== Club career ==
=== Atlético Madrid ===
Born in Madrid, Riquelme joined Atlético Madrid's youth setup in 2010 at the age of ten, after representing Rayo Vallecano and Real Zaragoza. He made his debut with the reserves on 16 March 2019, playing the last five minutes of a 1–0 Segunda División B away loss against SD Ponferradina.

Riquelme made his first team – and La Liga – debut on 1 September 2019, coming on as a late substitute for Thomas Lemar in a 3–2 home win over SD Eibar.

==== Loan to Bournemouth ====
On 1 October 2020, Riquelme joined English Championship club AFC Bournemouth on a season-long loan, with Bournemouth having the option to make the move permanent. He made his debut for the club as a substitute in a 1–1 away draw against Cardiff City. He scored his first goal for Bournemouth in a 1–1 draw with Derby County on 31 October 2020. Riquelme made his first start for the club in a 3–2 home loss to Preston.

==== Loan to Mirandés ====
On 30 August 2021, Riquelme moved to Segunda División side CD Mirandés on loan for the 2021–22 campaign. He was a regular starter for the side, scoring eight goals and providing 12 assists during the season.

==== Loan to Girona ====
On 1 August 2022, Riquelme was loaned to top tier side Girona FC for one year, after renewing his contract with Atleti until 2028. He returned to Átleti at the end of the season and received consistent game time, utilised as a left-wingback in Simeone's 3-5-2. He finished the 23/24 season with 4 goals and 5 assists, including a goal against Real Madrid in the Copa Del Rey Round of 16.

=== Betis ===
On 4 July 2025, Riquelme signed a five-year contract with fellow top tier side Real Betis.

== International career ==
Riquelme was a youth international for Spain, having called up for the 2023 UEFA European Under-21 Championship and finished as runner-up as Spain was defeated by England 1-0 in the final.

Riquelme got his first call-ups for the senior side on 16 November 2023, debuting in the 2024 Euro qualifying match against Cyprus, aged 23 years old.

== Career statistics ==
=== Club ===
As of match played 21 November 2026

Appearances and goals by club, season and competition -
Club	Season	League			National cup (Note: Includes Copa del Rey, FA Cup)		Continental		Other		Total	
Club	Season	Division	Apps	Goals	Apps	Goals	Apps	Goals	Apps	Goals	Apps	Goals
Atlético Madrid B	2018–19	Segunda División B	1	0	—		—		—		1	0
Atlético Madrid B	2019–20	Segunda División B	21	5	—		—		1 (Note: Appearance in Segunda División B play-offs)	0	22	5
Atlético Madrid B	Total		22	5	—		—		1	0	23	5
Atlético Madrid	2019–20	La Liga	1	0	1	0	0	0	0	0	2	0
Atlético Madrid	2023–24	La Liga	34	3	4	1	8 (Note: Appearances in UEFA Champions League)	0	1 (Note: Appearance in Supercopa de España)	0	47	4
Atlético Madrid	2024–25	La Liga	16	0	5	1	5	0	0	0	26	1
Atlético Madrid	Total		51	3	10	2	13	0	1	0	75	5
AFC Bournemouth (loan)	2020–21	Championship	16	1	3	1	—		—		19	2
Mirandés (loan)	2021–22	Segunda División	36	7	3	1	—		—		39	8
Girona (loan)	2022–23	La Liga	34	4	1	1	—		—		35	5
Betis	2025–26	La Liga	25	1	5	5	8 (Note: Appearances in UEFA Europa League)	1	—		38	7
Betis	2026–27	La Liga	12	3	1	2	3	0	—		16	5
Betis	Total		37	4	6	7	11	1	—		54	12
Career total			196	24	23	12	24	1	2	0	245	37

=== International ===
As of match played 19 November 2023

Appearances and goals by national team and year
National team	Year	Apps	Goals
Spain	2023	2	0
Total		2	0

== Honours ==
Spain U21

- UEFA European Under-21 Championship runner-up: 2023
