= Ángel Ortiz (footballer, born 2004) =

Spanish footballer (born 2004)

Personal information
- Full name: Ángel Ortiz Monterrey
- Date of birth: 25 July 2004 (age 22)
- Place of birth: Almendralejo, Spain
- Height: 1.67 m (5 ft 6 in)
- Position: Right-back

Team information
- Current team: Betis
- Number: 12

Youth career
- 2008–2017: Almendralejo
- 2017–2020: Betis
- 2020–2021: Calavera

Senior career*
Years	Team	Apps	(Gls)
2021–2025	Betis B	73	(2)
2025–	Betis	23	(0)

International career^{‡}
2022	Spain U18	3	(0)
2022	Spain U19	4	(0)
2025–	Spain U21	3	(1)
- * Club domestic league appearances and goals as of 20:25, 31 October 2026 (UTC) ‡ National team caps and goals as of 21:05, 14 October 2025 (UTC)

Ángel Ortiz Monterrey (born 25 July 2004) is a Spanish professional footballer who plays for La Liga club Real Betis. Mainly a right-back, he can also play as a right winger.

== Career ==
Ortiz is a youth product of his local club CD Almendralejo, before moving to the academy of Real Betis in 2017. In 2020 he had a year long stint with affiliate club Calavera CF, before returning to Betis Deportivo where he began his senior career in 2021. On 7 July 2023, he signed a professional contract with the club until 2025. He made his senior and professional debut with the senior Real Betis side as a starter in a 1–0 La Liga win over Mallorca on 25 January 2025, assisting his side's game-winning goal.

== International career ==
A youth product of Spain, Ortiz was called up to the Spain U19s in 2022 for a set of 2023 UEFA European Under-19 Championship qualification matches.

== Career statistics ==
=== Club ===
As of match played 31 October 2026

Appearances and goals by club, season and competition
Club	Season	League			Cup		Europe		Other		Total	
Club	Season	Division	Apps	Goals	Apps	Goals	Apps	Goals	Apps	Goals	Apps	Goals
Betis B	2021–22	Primera Federación	3	0	—		—		—		3	0
Betis B	2022–23	Segunda Federación	20	1	—		—		—		20	1
Betis B	2023–24	Segunda Federación	36	1	—		—		—		36	1
Betis B	2024–25	Primera Federación	14	0	—		—		—		14	0
Betis B	Total		73	1	—		—		—		73	1
Betis	2024–25	La Liga	5	0	—		1 (Note: Appearance in UEFA Conference League)	0	—		6	0
Betis	2025–26	La Liga	13	0	4	1	6 (Note: Appearances in UEFA Europa League)	0	—		23	1
Betis	2026–27	La Liga	5	0	0	0	2 (Note: Appearances in UEFA Champions League)	0	—		7	0
Betis	Total		23	0	4	1	9	0	0	0	36	1
Career total			96	1	4	1	9	0	0	0	109	2

== Honours ==
Betis

- UEFA Conference League runner-up: 2024–25
