= Facundo Bernal =

Uruguayan footballer (born 2003)

Personal information
- Full name: Facundo Bernal Cruz
- Date of birth: 21 August 2003 (age 23)
- Place of birth: Montevideo, Uruguay
- Height: 1.89 m (6 ft 2 in)
- Position: Defensive midfielder

Team information
- Current team: Betis
- Number: 6

Youth career
- Defensor Sporting

Senior career*
Years	Team	Apps	(Gls)
2021–2024	Defensor Sporting	64	(1)
2024–2026	Fluminense	59	(0)
2026–	Betis	8	(0)

International career^{‡}
2021–2022	Uruguay U20	12	(0)
2024	Uruguay local	1	(0)
2026–	Uruguay	4	(0)
- * Club domestic league appearances and goals as of 17 October 2026 ‡ National team caps and goals as of 18 November 2026

Facundo Bernal Cruz (born 21 August 2003) is a Uruguayan professional footballer who plays as a defensive midfielder for La Liga club Real Betis and the Uruguay national team.

== Club career ==
=== Defensor Sporting ===
Bernal is a youth academy graduate of Defensor Sporting. He made his professional debut for the club on 3 June 2021 in a 2–1 league win against Rocha.

=== Fluminense ===
On 3 August 2024, Bernal joined Brazilian club Fluminense. He quickly established himself as a starter for the side, also featuring in the 2025 FIFA Club World Cup.

=== Betis ===
On 6 July 2026, La Liga side Real Betis announced the signing of Bernal on a five-year contract.

== International career ==
Bernal has represented Uruguay at the under-20 level. He was part of the under-20 team which participated in the 2022 COTIF Tournament. In May 2024, Bernal was named in the first ever Uruguay local national team squad. He made his debut for the team on 31 May 2024 in a goalless draw against Costa Rica.

In October 2024, Bernal received his first call-up to the Uruguay national team. He made his debut for Uruguay on 24 September 2026 in a 3–1 defeat to Japan.

== Career statistics ==
=== Club ===
As of match played 4 November 2026

Appearances and goals by club, season and competition
Club	Season	League			State league		National cup (Note: Includes Copa Uruguay, Copa do Brasil)		Continental		Other		Total	
Club	Season	Division	Apps	Goals	Apps	Goals	Apps	Goals	Apps	Goals	Apps	Goals	Apps	Goals
Defensor Sporting	2021	USD	11	0	—		—		—		4 (Note: Appearances in playoffs)	0	15	0
Defensor Sporting	2022	Liga AUF Uruguaya	21	0	—		3	1	—		—		24	1
Defensor Sporting	2023	Liga AUF Uruguaya	12	0	—		5	0	0	0	0	0	17	0
Defensor Sporting	2024	Liga AUF Uruguaya	20	1	—		0	0	2 (Note: Appearances in Copa Libertadores)	1	1 (Note: Appearance in Supercopa Uruguaya)	0	23	2
Defensor Sporting	Total		64	1	0	0	8	1	2	1	5	0	79	3
Fluminense	2024	Série A	15	0	—		0	0	3	0	0	0	18	0
Fluminense	2025	Série A	22	0	8	0	5	0	7 (Note: Appearances in Copa Sudamericana)	0	5 (Note: Appearances in FIFA Club World Cup)	0	47	0
Fluminense	2026	Série A	10	0	4	0	1	0	3	0	—		18	0
Fluminense	Total		47	0	12	0	6	0	13	0	5	0	83	0
Betis	2026–27	La Liga	8	0	—		0	0	3 (Note: Appearances in UEFA Champions League)	0	—		11	0
Career total			119	1	12	0	14	1	18	1	10	0	173	3

=== International ===
As of match played 17 November 2026

Appearances and goals by national team and year
National team	Year	Apps	Goals
Uruguay	2026	4	0
Total		4	0

== Honours ==
Defensor Sporting

- Copa Uruguay: 2022, 2023
