= History of Real Betis =

History of Spanish association football club Real Betis Balompié

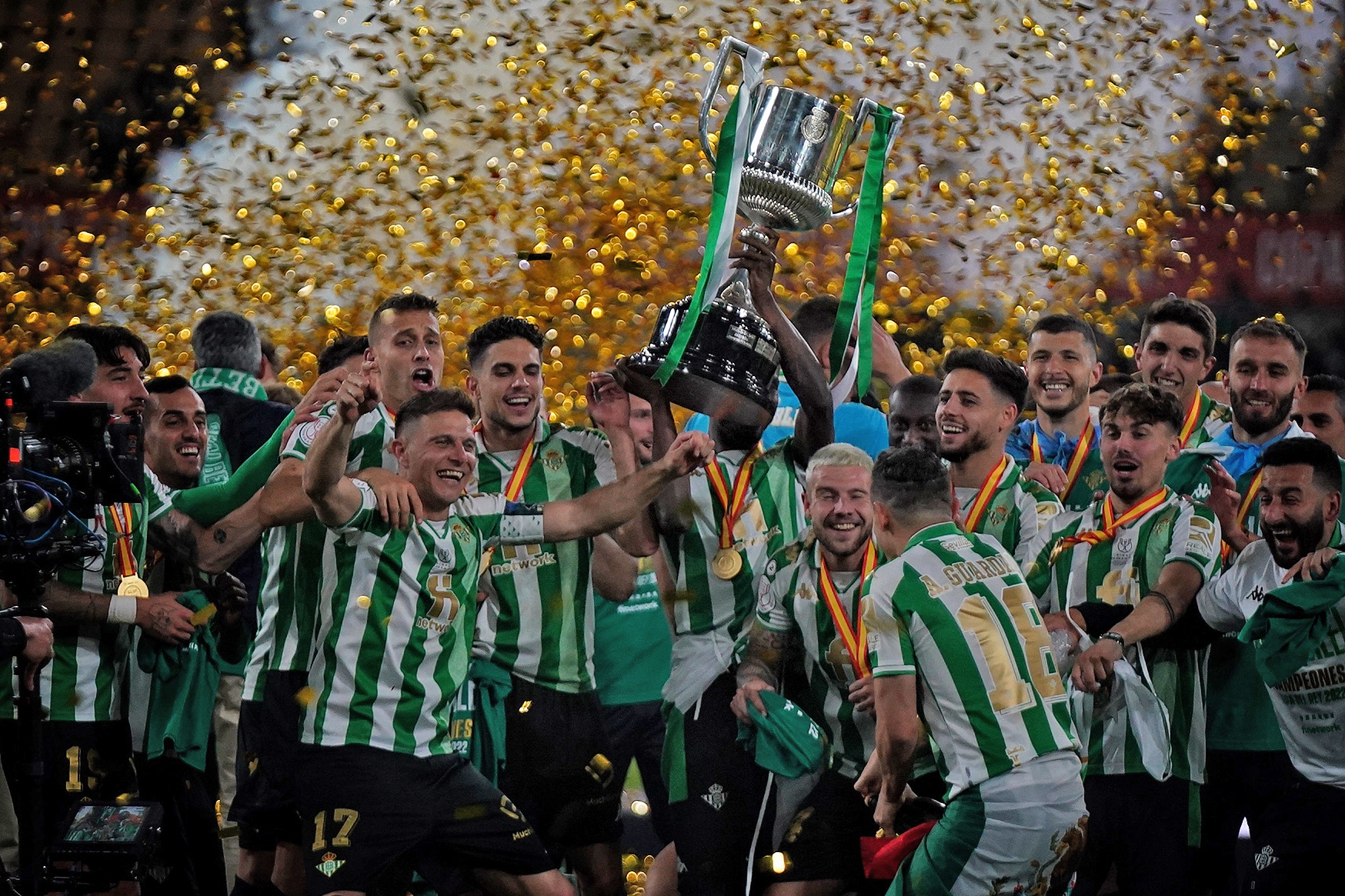
The team celebrates after winning the third Copa del Rey in 2022.

This is the history of Real Betis Balompié, a Spanish professional football club based in the city of Seville, founded on 12 September 1907, which has won a Campeonato de Liga de Primera División and three Copas del Rey as its main titles and which throughout its history has played in the first, second and third divisions of Spanish football. It is the Andalusian team that has achieved the most points and goals in a single first-division season (1996–97), as well as the one with the most points in a 22-game league season (1934–35).

== 1907–1929: Early years ==
The current Real Betis Balompié is the result of the merger produced in 1914, of two existing teams in the city, Sevilla Balompié, founded in 1907, and Betis Foot-ball Club, founded in 1909.

=== Sevilla Balompié ===
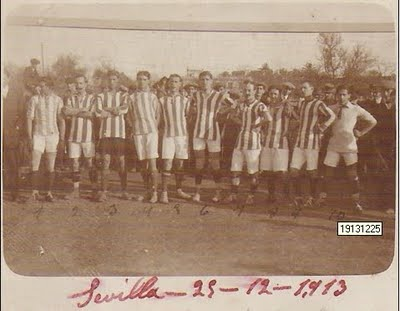
Sevilla Balompié lineup on 25 December 1913.

In 1907, a group of students from the Polytechnic School got together to organize a new football club in Seville. Among them were many groups of brothers, such as the Hermosa, Wesolowski, Castillo, Cáscales, and Gutiérrez, dressed in white and blue (representing the infantry). Its first president was Alfonso del Castillo Ochoa, and its first captain – who acted as coach – in 1914, was Manuel Ramos Asencio.

The rules of the "Sevilla Balompié" club, which consisted of fifteen articles, were established in the eighth article: "All foreigners who wish to play in this club may do so as passers-by". The fifteenth article added that the monthly membership fee was one peseta and the entrance fee was three pesetas and fifty cents. The board of directors of the club was formed by Alfonso del Castillo Ochoa (president), Roberto Vicente (vice president), Juan del Castillo Ochoa (treasurer), Vicente Peris (secretary), Salvador Morales (vice secretary), José Sequeiro, Edmundo Wesolowski, Jacinto Wesolowski, Gabriel Vadillo, and Antonio Gutiérrez (voting members).

Its headquarters were located in Calle Alfonso XII (1908–1909), c/Federico de Castro (1910–1911) and c/Jerónimo Hernández (1912–1914). The name chosen by the group of youngsters was "Sevilla Balompié" (España Balompié during the first months), to avoid the English word "football", which would become their trademark. The club was registered with the Civil Government on 1 February 1909. The "Balompié", as the team was known until the late 1920s, became the first winners of the Seville Cup in 1910, a status they retained until 1913. It also participated in the first edition of the Andalusian Cup in early 1910.

=== Betis Foot-ball Club ===
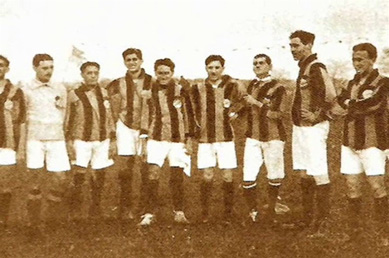
Betis Foot-Ball Club in 1909.

In 1909, the Betis Foot-ball Club was founded as a result of a split in the Sevilla Foot-ball Club, carried out by a group of members. Among its promoters were Rodríguez de la Borbolla, Diego Otero, Alberto Henke, Comesaña and Lissen Diego Otero. In 1914, through the efforts of its then president, Rodríguez de la Borbolla, King Alfonso XIII granted it the title of "Real".

=== Merger ===
In 1914, Balompié was again proclaimed champion of Seville and changed its name from “Sevilla Balompié” to “Real Betis Balompié”, after merging with Betis Foot-ball Club.

On 6 December 1914, the board of directors of Sevilla Balompié and, two days later, of Betis Football Club, approved the merger of the two clubs. This was promoted by Papá Jones, an Englishman with a passion for football. In August 1915, the Civil Governor of Seville, Severo Núñez, approved the statutes and the change of name of the new club, ordering that the name of "Sevilla" Balompié be changed to "Real Betis" Balompié (entry no. 283, page 36 of the Government Book of the Civil Registry). In this way, the legal authority granted to this merger the treatment of a merger by absorption, preserving for all purposes the legal continuity of the first company, which maintained its registration in the register no. 283 without dissolution. Beyond the legal aspect, on a purely practical level, Balompié contributed the players, the list of trophies, the fans, and the pitch, which from 1913 was El campo de las Tablas Verdes, in the Prado de San Sebastián, while Betis F. C. basically added the title of Real. Thus, the club was popularly known as "el Balompié" and its fans as "los balompedistas" until the 1930s. From then on, the term "Betis" and the nickname "béticos" entered the popular lexicon to refer to Real Betis Balompié and its supporters.

=== Consolidation of Real Betis ===
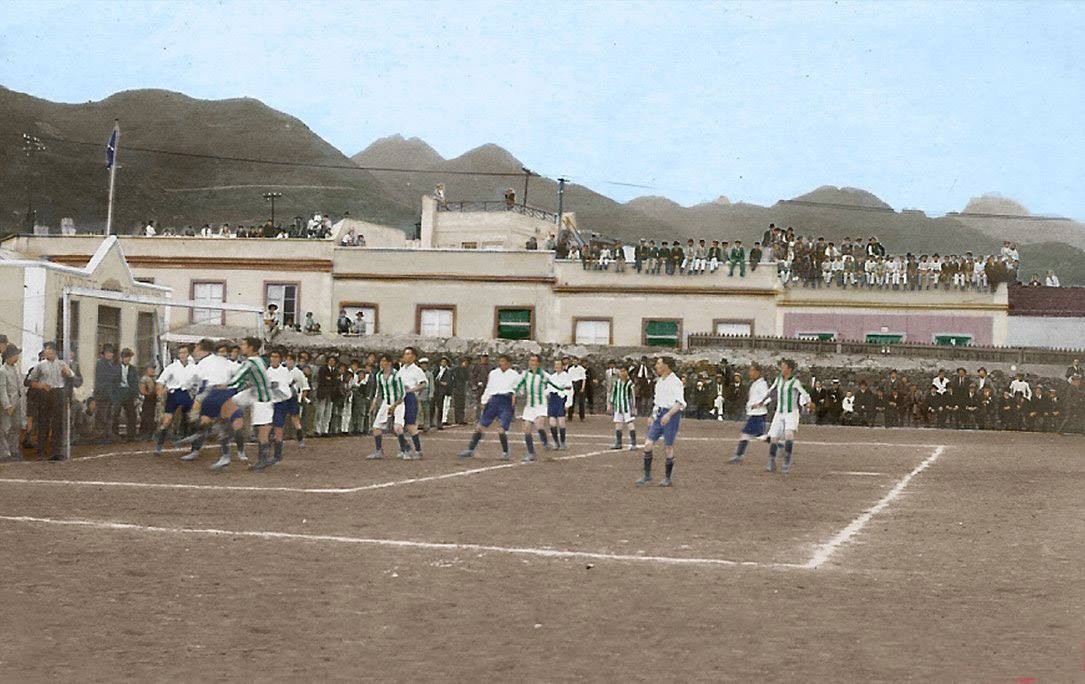
Colored image of the Real Betis match against Tenerife played in November 1919.

After being proclaimed champions of Seville again in 1915, Balompié began a decade of slow decline in which it almost disappeared, as it did not have the financial means or the right to retain players in the era of “brown amateurism”, or disguised professionalism. More than a dozen of its best players were taken away in a short period of time, despite which it almost won the Andalusian championship 3 times, as the only rival of Sevilla, with players who had left Balompié.

In 1924, with the help of some of its former founders who returned to the board, Balompié improved its performances, winning the Spencer Cup in 1926 and, after several runner-up finishes, the Andalusian Cup in 1928. With the creation of the Campeonato Nacional de Liga in 1929, Real Betis was already a club with a solid sporting, social and institutional base and began its journey in the Segunda División on 17 February 1929.

== 1930–1943: Golden Age ==
Betis Balompié's coat of arms during the Second Republic.

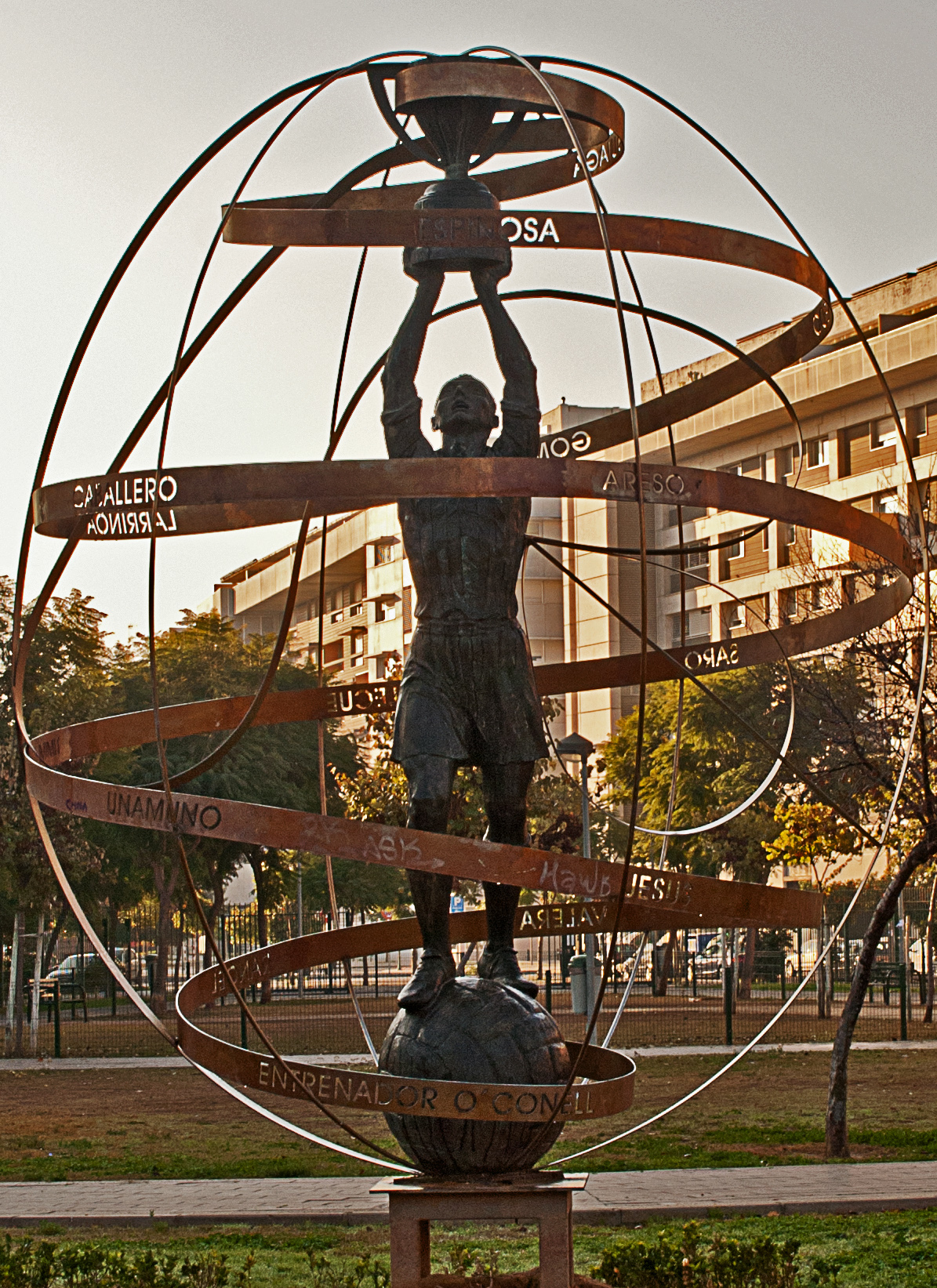
Monument to the league champions of the 1934–35 season.

At the beginning of the 1930s, the terms "Betis" and "Béticos" replaced "Balompié" and "Balompedistas" in the vernacular. In the first five years, the club wrote some of the most brilliant episodes in its history: in less than ten months, Betis became the first team from the south to reach the final of the Spanish Cup and celebrated its 25th anniversary with the title of Second Division champions on 3 April 1932. Betis Balompié - without the "Real" in the Second Republic - became the first Andalusian club to be promoted to Spain's first division.

In the first division, the club assembled a solid team that won the league in 1934–35 under the leadership of Patrick O'Connell. This team consisted of Urquiaga, Areso, Aedo, Peral, Gómez, Larrinoa, Adolfo, Lecue, Unamuno, Timimi, Saro, Caballero, Rancel, Valera and Espinosa; six Basques, three from the Canary Islands, three from Seville, one from Almería, one from Jaén and one from Valladolid, who grew up in Sestao. The title was won on 28 April 1935, with a 5–0 victory over Racing Santander in Santander. It was a Fair Sunday and the celebration moved to the fairground, where the news was announced on the boards of the stands.

A year later, the team that had won the championship was dismantled: firstly, due to a bad economic situation that forced the club to sell three of its players and, above all, due to the Civil War, which left the club without players because they were mobilized to the front. Only Peral and Saro remained in those years as representatives of those who had lifted the Cup fifteen months earlier. On 16 July 1936, a few days before the outbreak of the Civil War, the club signed a ten-year lease with the Seville City Council for the Estadio de la Exposición.

The consequences of the Civil War were bad for Betis, who also made the mistake of returning to competition in the 1939–40 season, when they could have applied for the moratorium granted to other clubs whose stadiums were used for "war purposes". As a result, on 28 April 1940, the fifth anniversary of their title win, the Green and Whites were relegated to the second division. Two years later, they briefly returned to the first division.

== The dark years: The "manquepierda" (1943–1955) ==
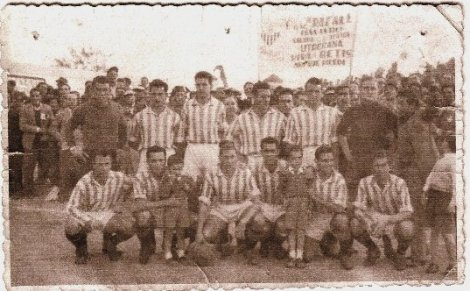
Photograph of the team in 1953, with a banner referring to the “manquepierda” slogan.

In 1943, the team was relegated to the second division. The situation got worse and in 1947 the team was relegated to the third division in the midst of a serious economic crisis (third tier in the league system at that time). They were relegated on 13 April 1947, at the same place where they had won the 1935 title: Santander, where they lost 4–1 to Racing Santander.

For seven years, Betis played in the third division. During those years, the expression "¡Viva er Beti manque pierda!" (Long live Beti, even if it loses!), (Note: The determiner "er" corresponds to a widespread but incorrect phonetic usage in areas of Andalusia. Similarly, "Beti" without the final "s" is part of the same characteristic phonetism of the south and other areas of Spain, where the final "s" is suppressed or aspirated due to a strong and characteristic accent.) attributed to the journalist and cartoonist Martínez de León, who created it for his character Oselito, became a distinctive phrase for the club and its fans.

The poet and journalist Joaquín Romero Murube described those years as follows:

"But instead of adopting the puzzling resignation with which we respond to so many misfortunes, the resignation of shrugging our shoulders instead of lifting our hearts, Betis, after the hecatomb, went out every afternoon with greater enthusiasm to conquer their glory.

— Joaquín Romero. 1958. Seville.

The experience in the third division strengthened the club and gave it the distinction of being the only team to have won the first, second and third divisions. The club returned to the second division in 1954 under the presidency of Manuel Ruiz Rodríguez, who resigned in 1955 when he felt he could no longer contribute to the club's growth.

== The comeback: Benito Villamarín (1955–1965) ==
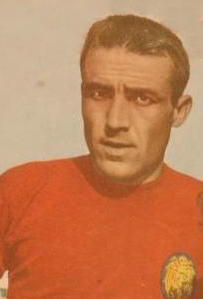
Homegrown player Luis del Sol played for Real Betis until 1960 and later won the 1964 European Nations' Cup with the Spanish national team.

In 1955, Benito Villamarín, a prosperous businessman from Ourense settled in Seville, was elected president. He took over the team in the second division after seven years in the third division. After a failed attempt at promotion in his first season, they reached the top flight in 1958 with Antonio Barrios as coach after fifteen years of hardship. Villamarín brought order to the institution and created new illusions among Betis fans. He witnessed the rise of Luis del Sol, one of the most important players in the club's history, and carried out important actions such as the purchase of the Heliópolis stadium in 1961, although he also had to make some unpopular decisions such as the sale of El Sol. The team settled well in the first division and finished third in the league in 1964.

After these positive years, in the next two years the club suffered the deaths of the first team coach, Andrés Aranda (1965), and a year later of Benito Villamarín, after ten years of presidency that expanded the club and also experienced the relegation to the Second Division. In the following years, the team experienced almost consecutive promotions and relegations, until being consolidated in the First Division in 1974.

== Stability: Nuñez Naranjo and Ferenc Szusza ==
After some years of instability, after the death of Benito Villamarín in 1969, José Núñez Naranjo became president, when, according to his statements, "the team was in the second division, had only four thousand members, and the numbers did not seem to improve, they could not improve in any way".

During his tenure, the team was promoted to the first division in 1971 and 1974. In 1971, Hungarian Ferenc Szusza, one of the club's longest-serving coaches, joined the club. With the club's technical secretary, José María de la Concha, he was able to build an excellent squad that included historic players such as Julio Cardeñosa, José Ramón Esnaola and the young Rafael Gordillo, one of the club's legends, who made his debut in 1977 and stayed with the club for nine seasons. The Benito Villamarín stadium was expanded with the construction of the north and south stands. He left his post in July 1979.

== The first Copa del Rey and the 1980s (1977–1992) ==
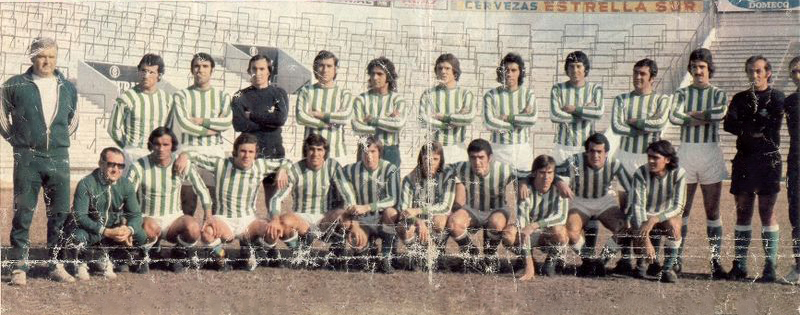
Real Betis squad in the 1974–75 season.

On 25 June 1977, Betis won the Copa del Rey at the Vicente Calderón Stadium against Athletic Bilbao. The team led by Rafael Iriondo and composed of Esnaola, Bizcocho, Biosca, Sabaté, Cobo, López, Alabanda, Cardeñosa, García Soriano, Megido, Benítez, Eulate and Del Pozo wrote a chapter in the history of Betis after a long shootout with 21 penalties. The following season, the team reached the quarterfinals of the European Cup Winners' Cup after defeating AC Milan, but were relegated to the second division.

After the promotion back to the top tier in 1979, Real Betis took part in the UEFA Cup in 1982 and 1984. This included the platinum jubilee in 1982, while in 1986, the team won second place in the Copa de la Liga. During this time, Real Betis played in the 1982 FIFA World Cup tournament and the 1983 Spain v. Malta qualifier game.

From then until 1992, Betis went through a period of economic and sporting crisis, until relegation in 1991, one of the worst moments to face the mandatory transformation into a Sociedad Anónima Deportiva.

== Becoming a sports corporation: Manuel Ruiz de Lopera ==
On 15 October 1990, the Sports Law established the obligation for the transformation of football clubs into public limited companies. The decree that regulated the process set 30 June 1992 as the deadline for this transformation. The share capital established for Betis by the Spanish football reorganization plan was 1,175 million pesetas (7.06 million euros). The fans contributed a total of 400 million pesetas in small amounts, to which another 100 million pesetas were added in packages of more than 1% of the required capital stock. The then economic vice-president, Manuel Ruiz de Lopera, took over the remaining capital at the last minute and became the club's majority shareholder.

After almost three years in the second division, Lorenzo Serra Ferrer, one of the club's most successful coaches, joined the club on the 27th matchday in March 1994. In the season of his arrival, he achieved promotion. The following year, Betis were the revelation of the first division, finishing third and having the fewest goals conceded in the category, which was the second-best ranking in the club's history. In the 1996–97 season, they again finished in the top four and reached the final of the Copa del Rey, where they lost to Barcelona in extra time. A few days before the final, an agreement was leaked between Serra, who had one year left on his contract with Betis, and Barcelona to coach their youth team.

During these years, players such as Alfonso, Finidi George, Cuéllar and Roberto Ríos, who joined Athletic Bilbao in 1997 for 2000 million pesetas (€12 million), a record sum at the time, stood out.

Betis had a respectable run in the UEFA Cup Winners' Cup, but soon entered a period of instability that led to relegation to the second division in 2000; the following season they returned to the first division with a strong run, qualifying for the UEFA Cup and finishing close to fourth place.

=== Copa del Rey and Champions League ===
2005 was one of the most successful years for Betis, as the club finished in a very respectable fourth place and qualified for the Champions League qualifying phase, winning the 2004–05 Copa del Rey at the Vicente Calderón. In August of the same year, they qualified for the Champions League format of the European Cup by defeating Monaco – runners-up in the 2003–04 edition – in the preliminary round, becoming the first Andalusian team to reach the competition.

Betis played in the group stage of the Champions League and were drawn in a group with Liverpool, the winners of the previous edition, and Chelsea, the winners of the Premier League. The 2006 season ended with the team on the verge of relegation. Ruiz de Lopera had a confrontation with Serra Ferrer that ended with the departure of the Mallorcan coach. The club entered in its biggest institutional crisis since the late 1980s, with criticism directed at Lopera, who left the presidency of the club and threatened to sell his shareholding package.

In the 2006–07 season, Real Betis had a poor season and only avoided relegation on the last day after beating Racing Santander 0–2 at El Sardinero, with two goals from Edu. The first coach was Javier Irureta, but after many bad results he was sacked and Luis Fernandez took over, who was also sacked on the last day of the season and replaced by Paco Chaparro, then coach of Real Betis Balompié "B".

=== 2009: Relegation to the second division and crisis ===
In 2009, after eight consecutive years in the first division and for the eleventh time in its history, the team was relegated to the second division. The team had finished near the bottom of the table for the last four seasons. The relegation came on 31 May, 2009, the last day of the season, with a 1–1 draw at the Benito Villamarín against Valladolid, after which the fans staged a sit-in in front of one of the stadium's gates and some went to the home of majority shareholder Manuel Ruiz de Lopera to express their disapproval.

On 15 June, over 60,000 Betis fans gathered in Seville, and many others in the rest of Spain, under the slogan "For your dignity and your future, I go, Betis", in the second largest demonstration in the club's 102-year history, after the 1935 La Liga title celebrations.

For this stage of the second division, Lopera hired Antonio Tapia from Málaga. Tapia's side got off to a good start with a 3–0 win over Córdoba on the first day of the season, picking up 12 of the first 15 possible points, but a run of four consecutive games without a win (three draws and a defeat) saw the club drop out of the promotion places. Betis collected only 30 points in the first round. Faced with this situation, Lopera sacked Tapia. His replacement was a familiar figure to the fans: Víctor Fernández, who also failed to secure promotion.

== The period of judicial intervention ==
In 2010, Manuel Ruiz de Lopera left the management of Real Betis, after a judicial process for corporate crime was initiated against his management at the head of Betis. On 7 July of the same year, he sold the shares he owned in the club, through the company Farusa, to the company Bitton Sport, represented by Luis Oliver, for an amount of 16 million euros. The Superior Council of Sports suspended the administrative procedure of prior authorization for the acquisition of these shares.

A few days later, on 16 July 2010, in the course of this judicial process, the Court No. 6 of Seville suspended the sale of the package of shares to Bitton Sport, froze the exercise of the political rights of 51% of the shares held by Farusa and imposed a bail of 25 million euros on Lopera. Also in August of the same year, the same court appointed Rafael Gordillo as administrator of the shares held by Farusa, who was also elected president of the board of directors of the club at the end of 2010. From then on, and for several years, the club was largely run by the court-appointed administrators and their deputies.

In January 2011, the company entered bankruptcy proceedings due to debts accumulated in previous years, although the company's governing bodies remained in place.

For the season in the second division, Pepe Mel was hired as coach. With the trio of Achille Emaná, Jorge Molina and Rubén Castro, Betis scored 98 goals between them that season. Promotion and the league title were achieved, but the team's performance was characterized by its irregularity: from six or seven consecutive wins, including a 5–0 win over Cartagena, to five defeats. In the 2010–11 Copa del Rey, the team reached the quarter-finals, losing to Barcelona. The team achieved promotion on 15 May 2011, despite losing 3–1 to Nàstic de Tarragona in Tarragona, due to Granada's 2–0 loss to Alcorcón.

=== Return to the top flight (2011–2014) ===
After promotion to the first division, Betis started the 2011–12 season with a 1–0 win over Granada at the Estadio Nuevo Los Cármenes. After this win, Betis went on a winning streak that put them at the top of the table, although they then suffered a new sporting crisis in which they suffered nine defeats. This streak was interrupted by a 0–0 draw with Málaga, although it continued until the match against Roberto Soldado's Valencia, which they won 2–1 with goals from Rubén Castro in the last four minutes of the match. After losing 4–2 to Barcelona, the first team to score against Barça since the summer, they drew 1–1 with Sevilla in the derby at the Benito Villamarín. On 2 May, the green and white team managed to win the Seville derby 2–1 at the Ramón Sánchez Pizjuán Stadium, thanks to two free kicks from Beñat Etxebarria, and then drew 2–2 with Barcelona.

The club started the 2012–13 season with a good rhythm, beating Athletic Bilbao 5–3 away at San Mamés, but after settling in the middle of the table, they suffered a blow when they lost 5–1 at Nervión to their eternal rivals. However, they bounced back the next day with a 1–0 home win over Real Madrid, with Beñat scoring, and after eliminating Valladolid and Las Palmas in the cup, were knocked out by eventual winners Atlético Madrid. In an up-and-down second half of the season, they beat Málaga (3–0), lost to Rayo Vallecano (3–0), and drew 3–3 in the Seville derby after going 3–0 down, with Nosa Igiebor scoring a last-minute goal. Betis, who emerged stronger from the derby, won 7 of the last 12 available points and qualified for the Europa League in the final match against Levante after seven years without playing in European competition. They finished ahead of their eternal rivals for the first time in eight years.

=== Europa League and third relegation in fourteen years ===
After a good pre-season, Real Betis were paired with Jablonec of the Czech League in the Europa League draw on 9 August. After comfortably passing the qualifying round, the team was drawn in Group I of the Europa League with Lyon, Vitória de Guimarães and Rijeka. Although the team made it through the group stage with a game in hand, poor performances in La Liga, where they finished last with only 10 points on the 15th matchday, led to the dismissal of Pepe Mel on 2 December 2013, and the appointment of Juan Carlos Garrido as new coach. On 19 January, after taking one point from fifteen league games and being eliminated from the cup by Athletic Bilbao, Garrido was replaced by former Betis player Gabriel Calderón. After five months without a win, Calderón improved the team's results a little, winning two games, but the team was still far from avoiding relegation. Despite the poor results, Betis went on to eliminate Rubin Kazan in the round of 32 in Europe. In the round of 16, they won the first Seville derby in European competition against Sevilla at the Ramón Sánchez Pizjuán with a resounding 2–0 victory in the first leg. However, Sevilla equalized the tie in the second leg and eventually won on penalties to knock Betis out of the competition.

After the elimination, the team was relegated to the second division after losing 0–1 against Real Sociedad. At the end of the game, the fans protested to the board of directors, chaired by Manuel Domínguez Platas. At the end of the season, Gabriel Calderón was fired as coach.

=== Second division (2014–15) ===
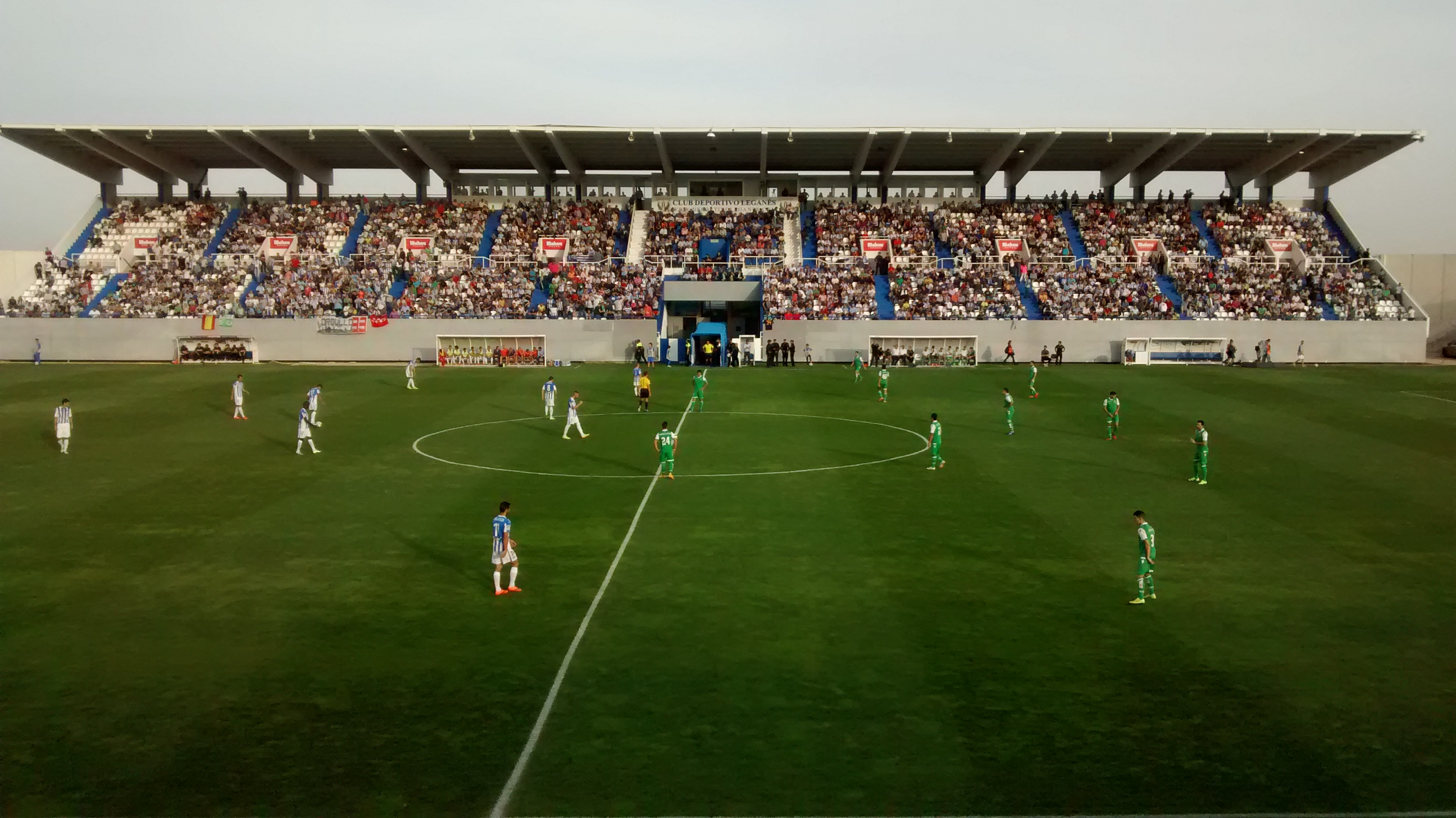
Match against Leganés at the Estadio Municipal de Butarque (1–0) played on 19 October 2014.

For this season, coach Julio Velázquez, who had achieved a respectable fourth place with Real Murcia the previous season, was hired. The start was uneven, with some victories (Sabadell, Numancia and Girona) mixed with several defeats, among which stand out a 4–1 against Ponferradina and a 0–1 loss at the Villamarín against a newly promoted Albacete. As time went on, things started to go wrong and the defeat against Alavés on 23 November was a key moment in the season. Two days later, Velázquez was sacked, leaving the team in sixth place with 21 points after 14 games (six wins, three draws and five defeats) and 8 points out of direct promotion. The board of directors also resigned and Juan Carlos Ollero was appointed president. Juan Merino, the coach of the club's second team, was provisionally appointed until a new coach could be hired. He was in charge of four matches against Llagostera, Mallorca, Lugo and Racing, but the results obtained (four wins and therefore 12 points out of a possible 12) were vital for the team to get closer to the objective of returning to the highest category of Spanish football, reaching third place before Christmas.

On the eve of the match against Racing, the club officially announced the return of Pepe Mel. With him, the team continued its positive run and slowly settled into the direct promotion positions. On the 35th matchday, with seven games to go and one round after Velazquez's dismissal, the team led the division with 71 points, 8 points ahead of the third-placed team, having collected 50 points out of a possible 63 with fifteen wins, five draws and just one defeat in the last 21 games. The promotion was achieved on 24 May 2015, after beating Agrupación Deportiva Alcorcón 3–0 in the match corresponding to the 40th matchday of the category, with two matches still to be played, and was proclaimed champion of the second division. The team finished the season with 84 points.

== Shareholder restructuring and new club leadership ==
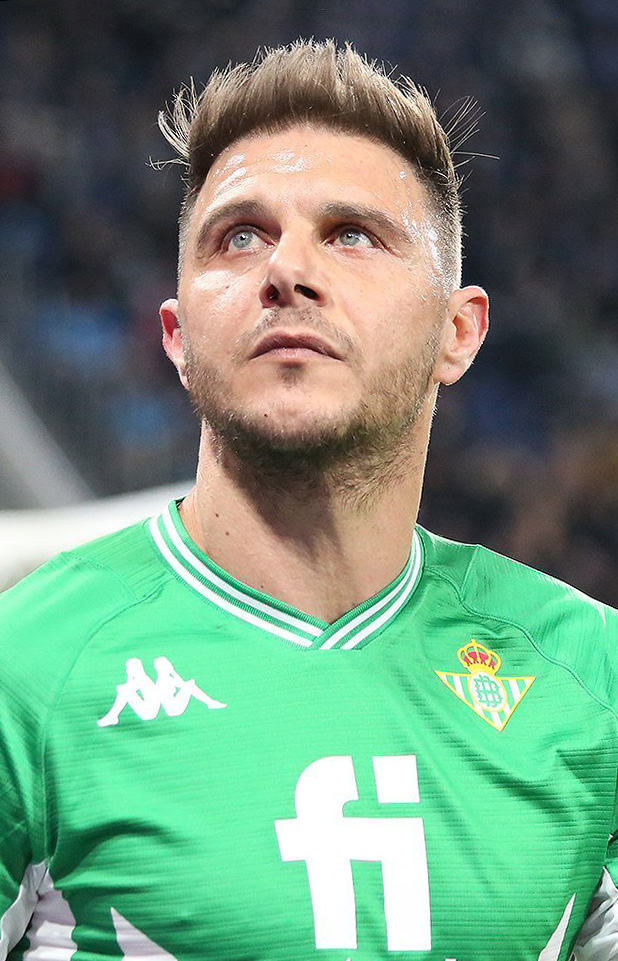
Joaquín returned to Real Betis on 31 August 2015, just before the transfer window closed for the season.

The 2015–16 season began with the convening of a shareholders' meeting, the only item on the agenda being the renewal of the board of directors. On 23 September, with 53.71% of the possible 68.66% of the shares accredited to the meeting (31.34% of the shares had been suspended due to legal disputes), the Ahora Betis ahora slate of directors Ángel Haro and José Miguel López Catalán received the support of 27.4% of the shareholders present against the Mucho más que un sentimiento slate of lawyer Manuel Castaño. Thus, the club was once again governed by its shareholders, without the presence of a receiver.

The Annual General Meeting held on 17 December ratified the Board of Directors elected at the Extraordinary General Meeting and approved the accounts for the 2014–15 season.

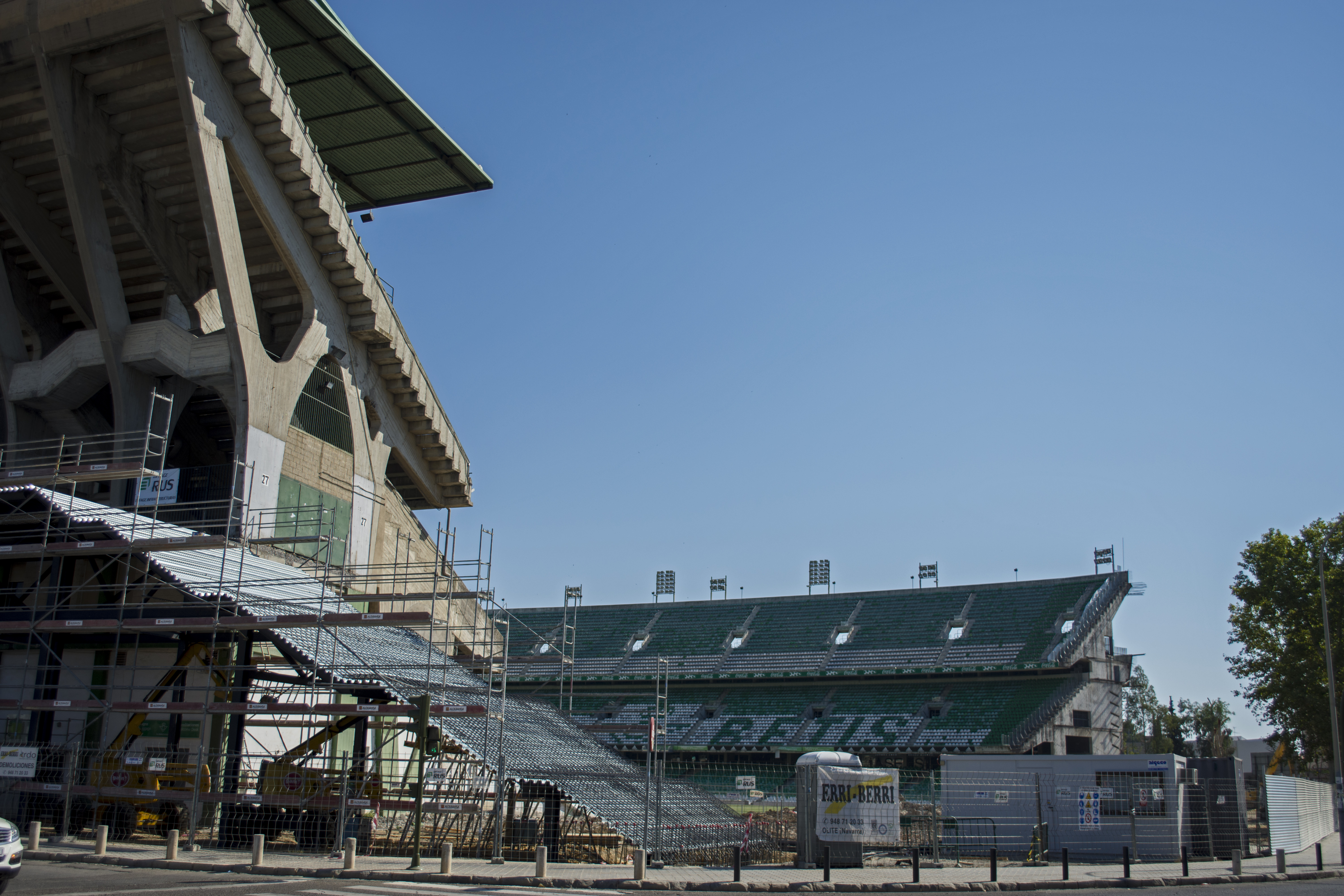
View of the Benito Villamarín stadium in 2016, after the demolition of the Gol Sur stand.

On 31 August 2015, just before the close of the transfer market, it was announced that Joaquín would return to Real Betis Balompié, where he would break several historical records for his presence at the club. On the sporting side, the season passed relatively calmly, avoiding relegation on the 34th matchday after a 1–0 victory over Las Palmas, finishing in 10th place in the table.

In June 2016, taking advantage of the end of the season, the 1972 south stand was demolished and work began on the new one, continuing the project of architect Antonio González Cordón that had been halted in 1999. During that season, ticket holders were relocated to other areas of the ground, and a year later, in the summer of 2017, the new south stand was inaugurated, increasing the stadium's capacity by 9,700 spectators.

On 19 June, Real Betis Féminas secured a place in the Primera División after beating CD Femarguín in the final round. With this result, both teams (men's and women's) competed in the highest division in the 2016–17 season. One day later, the vice-president of the entity, together with Juan Varela (president of Fútbol Sala Nazareno) and Javier Lozano Cid (president of the LNFS), announced the integration of Real Betis FSN into the structure under the name of Real Betis FutSal, after three years of sponsorship, so that all the employees of that club became part of the payroll of Real Betis Balompié. A month later, on 21 July, the purchase of 99.99% of the shares of Club Baloncesto Sevilla for the modest sum of 1 euro was made official. These two sports integrations (futsal and basketball) were approved by 27.45% of the share capital at the general meeting on 30 December.

During that season, the team had up to three first team coaches (Gustavo Poyet, Víctor Sánchez del Amo and, on an interim basis, Alexis Trujillo). The team finished in 15th place and was knocked out of the Copa del Rey early.

=== 2017 capital increase ===
On 23 November, the General Assembly was held, fulfilling one of the main points of President Haro's program, in which it was established that the club should be in the hands of the Betis supporters. With 25.05% of the capital present, 23.539% of the votes were in favor of the capital increase of 36,869 new shares to reinstate the share capital whose rights were suspended by the Commercial Court of Seville and its subsequent sale to shareholders and season ticket holders at a price of 120 euros, as well as the purchase of 23,056 shares from Manuel Ruiz de Lopera and Luis Oliver Albesa to be sold to shareholders in packages of 210 shares at a price of 476.69 euros each.

=== Quique Setién and the return to Europe (2017–2019) ===
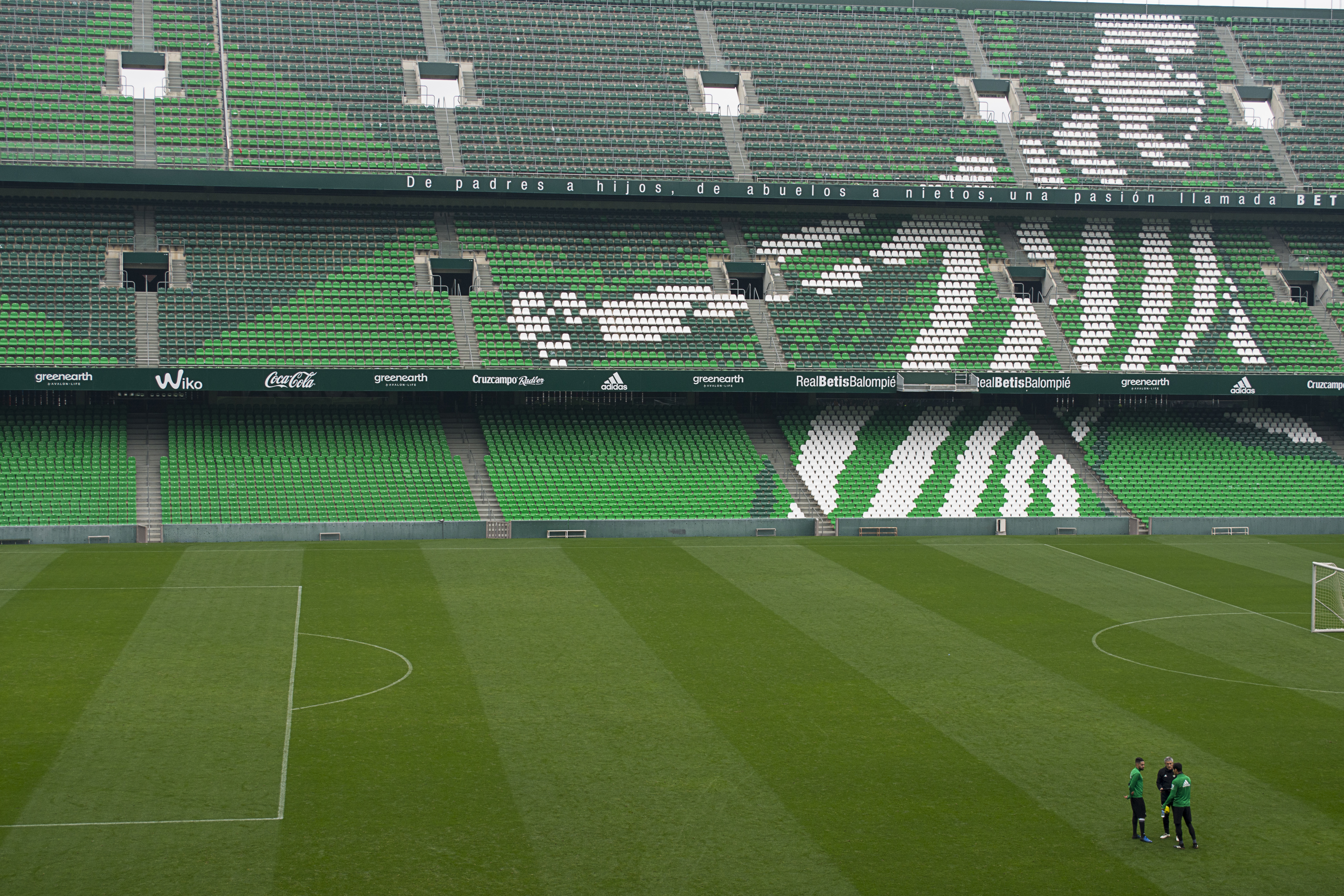
Benito Villamarín Stadium on 5 January 2018. After a Real Betis training session, coach Quique Setién talks to Aïssa Mandi and Ryad Boudebouz.

Quique Setién arrived in June 2017 on a three-year contract. In his first season, after several seasons in mid-table, the team managed to qualify directly for the UEFA Europa League, finishing sixth in the table. Participation in the Copa del Rey was not good, as they were eliminated in the round of 32 by Cádiz, who were playing in the second division that season. The team achieved good results against Sevilla FC (3–5 at the Nervión stadium and 2–2 at home) after four years without a win in these fixtures.

Quique Setién's second season at the helm (2018–19) began with the UEFA Europa League draw on 31 August, in which the club was drawn in Group F alongside Milan, Olympiacos and F91 Dudelange. In this phase, Betis finished first with three wins and three draws. They were then eliminated from the competition in the round of 32 by Rennes, and in the Copa del Rey, whose final was played at the Benito Villamarín stadium, they were eliminated in the semi-finals by Valencia.

At the end of the season, Real Betis decided to terminate Quique Setién's contract. The Cantabrian would not finish the remaining year of his contract.

== A step forward with Pellegrini ==
In July 2020, Betis reached an agreement with Chilean coach Manuel Pellegrini to lead the team for the next three seasons. Pellegrini arrived as an experienced coach, well versed in Spanish football and with prestige in Europe, having managed major clubs on the continent. Almost simultaneously, he hired Antonio Cordón, the former sporting director of Villarreal, who had worked with Pellegrini during the latter's tenure as manager of Villarreal. In the Chilean's first season, the team performed well, finishing sixth in the league and qualifying for the UEFA Europa League. The team reached the quarter-finals of the Copa del Rey.

In his second year in charge (2021–22), there was an improvement in results. The Chilean coach summarized the season as follows: "We won the Cup, we improved in the league compared to last season, we scored a hundred goals, more than last season, and in defense we conceded less. We finished the Europa League as champions and fought until the end to get into the Champions League. The most important thing for me is the commitment of the team. I would like to thank the players and the Betis fans for their solidarity. There are ways and means to achieve success."

== Timeline of Real Betis Balompié ==
- 1907 – The club is founded on 12 September 1907 under the name of Sevilla Balompié.
- 1909 – Formal registration of Sevilla Balompié in the Civil Government Book dated 1 February (page 36, entry 283), being the first Sevillian club to appear in the Book.
- 1909 – A split in the Sevilla Foot-ball Club leads to the foundation of the Betis Foot-ball Club.
- 1910 – Balompié is proclaimed Champion of the Cup given by the Mayor (Mayor of Seville Cup), becoming the first Champion of Seville.
- 1911 – Balompié is again proclaimed Champion of what is now formally called the Seville Cup, revalidating the previous year's trophy.
- 1911 – Real Betis is proclaimed winner of the first Spencer Cup, defeating Español de Cádiz in the final.
- 1913 – First recorded defeat of Balompié in a derby against Sevilla Foot-ball Club.
- 1913 – In the middle of the year, Betis Foot-ball Club was practically dissolved and most of its members joined Sevilla Foot-ball Club, and in the same year they were proclaimed champions of Seville for the third time.
- 1914 – At the beginning of the year, Eladio García de la Borbolla and other members of the Sevilla Foot-ball Club reorganize the Betis Foot-ball Club, for which they obtain the title of Real (royal).
- 1914 – Balompié wins its fourth Seville Cup (the 1912 edition did not take place), which goes down in history as the "Copa Violetero".
- 1914 – Herbert Richard Jones and Manuel Ramos Asensio, president and captain of Sevilla Balompié, promote the merger with Real Betis FC, leading to the change of name from "Sevilla" Balompié to "Real Betis" Balompié.
- 1915 – On 6 January, Real Betis Balompié wins the Sociedad Artística Sevillana Cup, beating Sevilla 1–0. It is the first trophy under the new name and the first derby after the name change.
- 1915 – Balompié wins its fifth Seville Cup, the first under the new name.
- 1918 – On 31 October, the Campo del Patronato Obrero is inaugurated.
- 1920 – It is proclaimed champion of the Copa Ayuntamiento.
- 1926 – On 3 October, Betis is proclaimed champion for the second time of the Spencer Cup, organized by the Southern Regional Federation in memory of the late Enrique Gómez. Real Betis won both games against Sevilla FC, 3–1 at Sevilla's ground and 2–0 at Betis' ground.
- 1928 – On 29 January, Real Betis Balompié is proclaimed Champion of the Andalusian Cup.
- 1928 – On 7 October, the Balompié defeats its eternal rival 2–1 in the inauguration of the Nervión field.
- 1931 – First Andalusian team to reach the final of the Spanish Cup against Athletic Bilbao. They lose 3–1 in the final on 21 June.
- 1932 – Real Betis commemorates its Silver Jubilee (1907–1932) with a friendly match against Athletic Club, its rival in the final of the 31st, which it defeats 2–1 on 6 January.
- 1932 – Real Betis becomes the first Andalusian team to reach the first division, where it debuts on 27 November of that year.
- 1934 – On 27 May, Simón Lecue becomes the first Betis player to play international football.
- 1934 – Death of Ignacio Sánchez Mejías, president of the club at the end of the 1920s and Honorary President in the early 1930s.
- 1934–35 – Real Betis Balompié become league champions after beating Racing Santander 5–0 in the final and decisive matchday.
- 1936 – On 16 July, Betis signs the lease of the Estadio de la Exposición (Heliópolis) with the City Council. On 18 July, the price list and the way to get the season tickets for the new stadium are published in the ABC. That same day, the war breaks out and the club's secretariat, located in Bilbao Street, is hit by a bomb aimed at the Civil Government.
- 1939 – On 14 March, the Heliópolis Stadium reopens after having been used for "war purposes".
- 1939–40 – Betis, very weakened by the Spanish Civil War, is relegated to the second division on the fifth anniversary of its league title (28 April).
- 1941–42 – The club returns to the first division.
- 1942–43 – After a brief stay in the First Division, the club is once again relegated to the Second Division.
- 1943–1946 – The club remains in the second division.
- 1946–47 – The club is relegated to the third division, in the same place where it had won the league twelve years earlier (Santander).
- 1948 – On 29 January, the stadium is completely flooded by the Tamarguillo stream, with the destruction of almost all its archives.
- 1953–54 – After seven years in the third division, the club is promoted back to the second division.
- 1955 – Benito Villamarín takes charge of the club.
- 1957 – The Board of Directors approves the current crest on 8 January.
- 1957–58 – The club is promoted back to the first division.
- 1958 – Betis defeats Sevilla 4–2 in the first official derby in fifteen years and the first official match played in the newly inaugurated stadium.
- 1958 – During the penultimate week of December, the major events of the club's Golden Jubilee (1907–1958), which had been postponed the previous year, take place.
- 1961 – On the occasion of a friendly match against Fiorentina, Benito Villamarín signs on the field the contract by which the ownership of the Stadium is acquired from the City Council.
- 1963–64 – Betis finishes 3rd in the league, wins the Ramón de Carranza Trophy against Boca Juniors, Benfica and Real Madrid, and qualifies for the Fairs Cup.
- 1964–65 – Betis debut in Europe in the former Fairs Cup. They are eliminated by Stade Français. López Hidalgo is the first Betis player to score in European competitions.
- 1965–66 – The club is relegated to the second division and Benito Villamarín's term as president comes to an end.
- 1966–67 – The club is promoted to the first division.
- 1967–68 – The club is relegated to the second division.
- 1970–71 – The club is promoted to the first division.
- 1972–73 – The club is relegated to the second division.
- 1973–74 – The club is promoted to the first division.
- 1976–77 – Real Betis wins the Copa del Rey.
- 1977–78 – The club is relegated to the second division. In the same season, they played in the European Cup Winners' Cup. In their first participation after winning the Copa del Rey in 1977, Betis surprisingly beat Milan in the round of 32 and Lokomotiv Leipzig in the round of 16, but could not overcome the cold of Tbilisi and were eliminated in the quarter-finals by Dynamo Moscow.
- 1978–79 – The club is promoted to the first division.
- 1981–82 – Coach Pedro Buenaventura Gil leads the team to the UEFA Cup.
- 1982 – In September, Betis celebrates its platinum jubilee (1907–1982).
- 1982–83 – The UEFA Cup is contested and Benfica end Betis' dreams in the first round with a 2–1 win in both games.
- 1983 – The Benito Villamarín stadium hosts the Spain–Malta match, which ends 12–1.
- 1984–85 – Betis participates again in the UEFA Cup with the same result. This time it was Romania's Universitatea Craiova who eliminated them in the first round on penalties.
- 1985–86 – The club finishes as runners-up in the Copa de la Liga, losing to FC Barcelona in the final.
- 1987–88 – The club is saved from relegation in the last league game.
- 1988–89 – The club is relegated to the second division after losing the promotion battle to Tenerife.
- 1989–90 – The club is promoted to the first division.
- 1990–91 – The club is relegated to the second division.
- 1992 – On 30 June, the club becomes a sports corporation with the required minimum capital (1,175 million pesetas, the second highest in the first and second divisions), thanks to the contributions of the Betis fans – 500 million pesetas, 400 million in small stakes, which is one of the largest amounts collected by the fans of a club in Spain – and the last minute contribution of 680 million pesetas in guarantees provided by the economic vice-president, Ruiz de Lopera.
- 1993–94 – The club is promoted to the first division.
- 1994–95 – The club qualifies for the UEFA Cup after finishing 3rd in the league. On the penultimate matchday, a decisive derby is played with both clubs tied on points and fighting for the top spots.
- 1995–96 – In the UEFA Cup, Betis beat Fenerbahçe in the first round. German side Kaiserslautern were their next opponents before they were defeated by Bordeaux in the third round, with a very young Zinedine Zidane scoring at the Villamarín.
- 1996–97 – The club qualifies for the Cup Winners' Cup after finishing second in the Copa del Rey, losing to Barcelona in the final. They finish 4th in the league, which does not qualify them for the Champions League at the time.
- 1997–98 – Betis returns to the Cup Winners' Cup 20 years later, although they lost to Barça in the Copa del Rey final. Chelsea, the eventual winners of the tournament, defeats the verdiblancos in the quarter-finals. They qualify for the UEFA Cup after finishing eighth. Denilson becomes the most expensive signing in history.

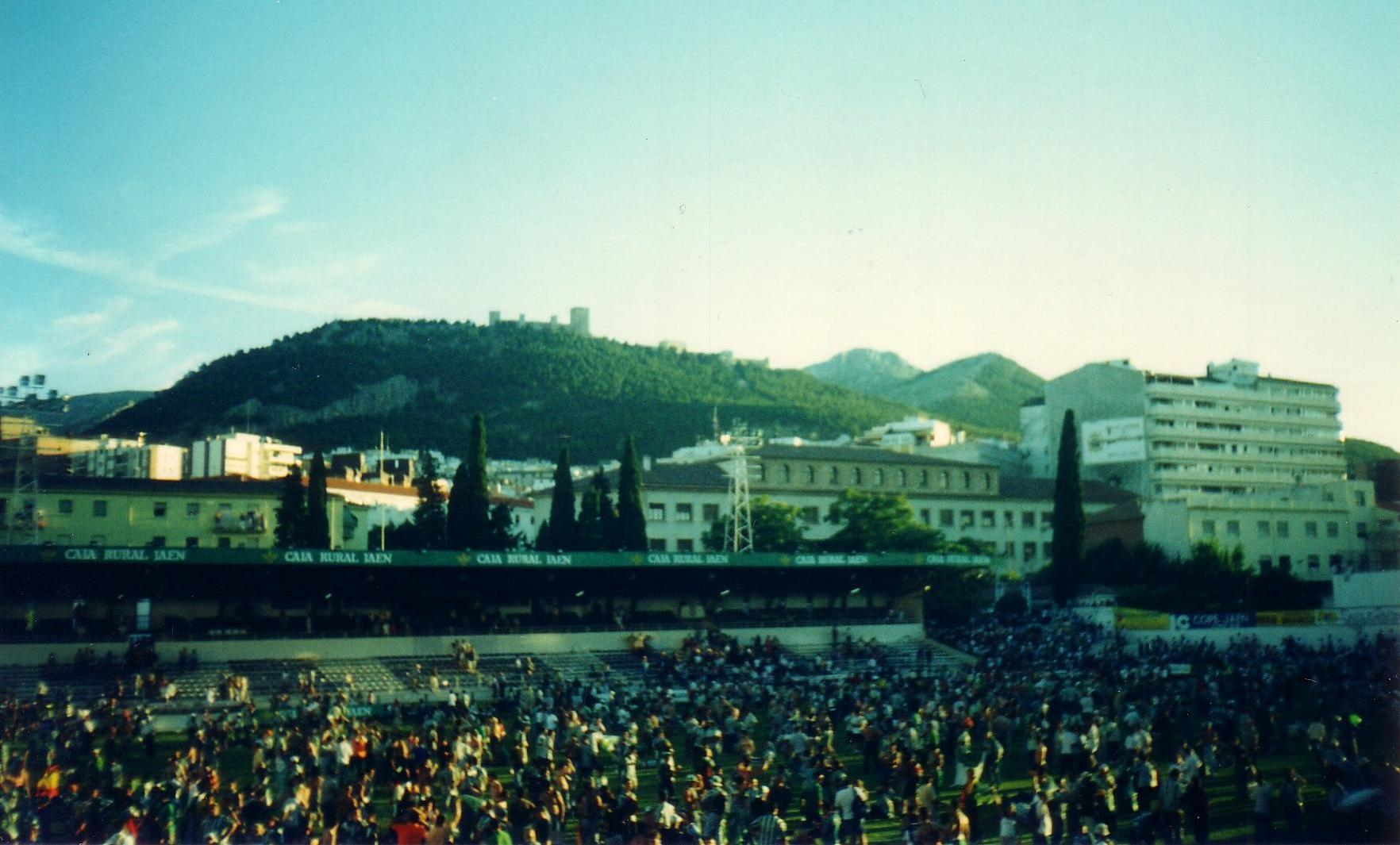
The fans of Betis invade the Estadio de la Victoria after winning the promotion game against Real Jaén in 2001.

- 1998–99 – Italian team Bologna eliminates Betis in the third round of the UEFA Cup.
- 1999–2000 – The club is relegated to the second division.
- 2000 – Real Betis' stadium changes its name.
- 2000–01 – The club is promoted to the first division.
- 2001–02 – The club qualifies for the UEFA Cup after finishing sixth in the league.
- 2002–03 – French side Auxerre beat Betis in the second leg to progress to the fourth round of the UEFA Cup.
- 2004–05 – 4th place in the league, which qualifies Betis for the Champions League qualifying round. The club is proclaimed champion of the Copa del Rey, with Lorenzo Serra Ferrer as coach, on 11 June after beating Osasuna 2–1. The goals were scored by Oliveira and Dani for Betis and Aloisi for Osasuna.
- 2005–06 – In August, Betis loses the Spanish Super Cup to Barcelona and qualifies for the Champions League by eliminating the runners-up of the 2004 edition, Monaco, in the preliminary round. They finished 3rd in the Champions League group where they played Chelsea, Liverpool and Anderlecht. They then went on to play in the UEFA Cup, where they were eliminated by Steaua Bucharest in the round of 16. Manuel Ruiz de Lopera (president of Betis) resigned due to judicial disqualification and José León Gómez was appointed as president. In the league, they avoided relegation with two rounds to go.
- 2006–07 – After an up-and-down start to the season under Javier Irureta, who ended his contract with the club and left, Manuel Ruiz de Lopera hired a new coach, Luis Fernandez. With him, there was a moment of recovery and good results, but the bad times returned and Manuel Ruiz de Lopera announced, two days before the end of the league, that on 1 July 2007 he would return to the presidency of the club and that if the members wanted, he would put the shares he owned up for sale at the end of the year. On the penultimate matchday, Betis lost 5–0 at home with serious incidents of violence from the crowd, and Luis Fernández was sacked and replaced by Paco Chaparro, who led Betis to permanence in the league after a 2–0 win in Santander.
- 2007–08 – Héctor Cúper had a regular start as coach, but the results were not good. He was sacked after a 0–2 home defeat to Atlético Madrid. Paco Chaparro took over again and with a fantastic second half of the season he saved the team from relegation with 5 games to go.
- 2008–09 – After a difficult final matchday, Real Betis drew with Valladolid, a result that, together with Sporting Gijón and Osasuna's wins and Getafe's draw, confirmed the club's relegation.
- 2010–11 – After Celta Vigo drew 1–1 with Salamanca, Betis were mathematically promoted to the first division after two years.
- 2012–13 – Qualified for the Europa League after a seven-year absence from European competition.
- 2013–14 – Betis reaches the round of 16 in the Europa League, where they meet Sevilla. Both games end 0–2 for the visitors, but Sevilla wins on penalties. In the league, the club is relegated to the second division.
- 2014–15 – Betis are promoted to the Primera División as champions.
- 2021–22 – Betis are crowned Copa del Rey champions for the third time after defeating Valencia 5–4 on penalties following a 1–1 draw. The goals were scored by Borja Iglesias, who gave his team a 1–0 lead in the 11th minute, and Hugo Duro, who tied the game at 1–1 in the 30th minute. The match was played at the Estadio de La Cartuja in Seville.

== See also ==
- 2024–25 Real Betis season
