= 1977 Copa del Rey final =

Copa del Rey 1977 final
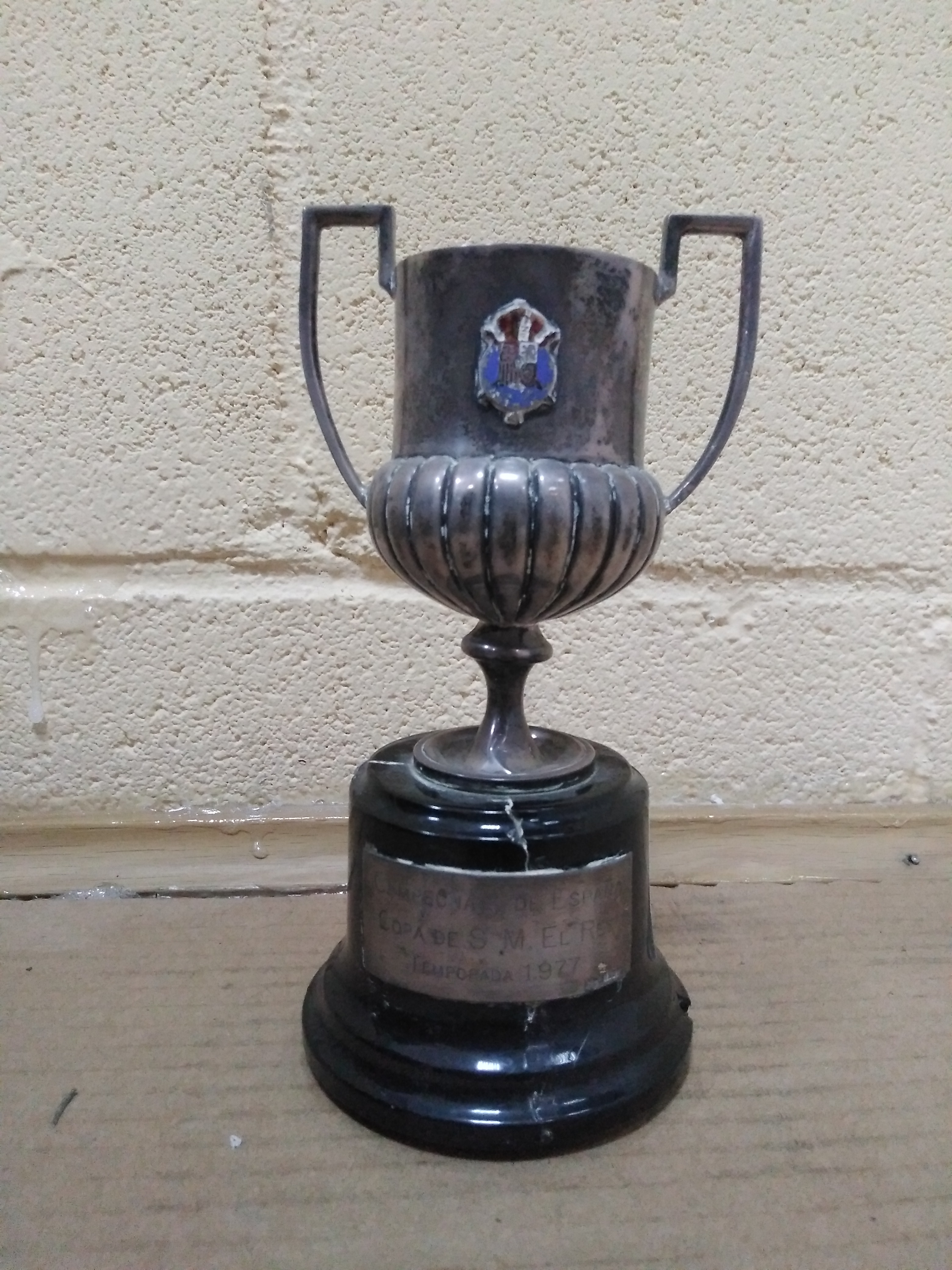
- Copy of the trophy
- Event: 1976–77 Copa del Rey
Real Betis	Athletic Bilbao
2	2
- Date: 25 June 1977
- Venue: Vicente Calderón, Madrid
- Referee: José Luis García Carrión
- Attendance: 70,000

The 1977 Copa del Rey final was the 75th final of the Copa del Rey. It was played at the Vicente Calderón Stadium in Madrid on 25 June 1977, with Real Betis defeating Athletic Bilbao in a penalty shoot-out after a 2–2 draw.

== Road to the final ==
Real Betis			Round	Athletic Bilbao
Opponent	Result	Legs		Opponent	Result	Legs
Barakaldo	5–2	1–0 away; 5–1 home	First Round
Sestao	7–2	5–1 home; 1–2 away	Second Round
Deportivo	6–1	1–2 away; 4–0 home	Third Round
Valladolid	3–2	1–2 away; 1–1 home	Round of 16	Elche	4–1	1–0 away; 4–0 home
Hércules	3–3	2–1 home; 2–1 away	Quarter-finals	Sevilla	6–3	5–0 home; 3–1 away
Espanyol	2–1	1–0 away; 2–0 home	Semi-finals	Salamanca	8–1	6–0 home; 1–2 away

== Match ==
25 June 1977
21:00 CET

Real Betis	2–2	Athletic Bilbao
López 45', 116'	Report (in Spanish)	Carlos 14'; Dani 97'
Penalties
García Soriano (penalty scored); Del Pozo (penalty scored); López (penalty scored); Biosca (penalty scored); Cardeñosa (penalty missed); Sabaté (penalty scored); Alabanda (penalty missed); Esnaola (penalty scored); Eulate (penalty scored); Bizcocho (penalty scored)	8–7	(penalty scored) Guisasola; (penalty scored) Churruca; (penalty scored) Escalza; (penalty scored) Irureta; (penalty missed) Dani; (penalty scored) Amorrortu; (penalty missed) Villar; (penalty scored) Alexanko; (penalty scored) Rojo; (penalty missed) Iribar

Vicente Calderón Stadium, Madrid
Attendance: 70,000
Referee: José Luis García Carrión

Real Betis	Athletic Bilbao

Real Betis:
GK	1	(Spain) José Ramón Esnaola
DF	2	(Spain) Francisco Bizcocho	(yellow card) 50'
DF	5	(Spain) Antonio Biosca
DF	4	(Spain) Jaume Sabaté
DF	3	(Spain) Juan Manuel Cobo (c)		(substituted off) 55'
MF	6	(Spain) Francisco López	(yellow card) 81'
MF	8	(Spain) Sebastián Alabanda
MF	10	(Spain) Julio Cardeñosa
FW	7	(Spain) Juan Antonio García Soriano
FW	9	(Spain) Alfredo Megido		(substituted off) 106'
FW	11	(Spain) Antonio Benítez
Substitutes:
FW	14	(Spain) José Antonio Eulate		(substituted on) 106'
FW	15	(Spain) Rafael del Pozo		(substituted on) 55'
Manager:
(Spain) Rafael Iriondo

Athletic Bilbao:
GK	1	(Spain) José Ángel Iribar (c)
DF	2	(Spain) José Lasa		(substituted off) 38'
DF	5	(Spain) Agustín Guisasola
DF	6	(Spain) José Ramón Alexanko
DF	3	(Spain) Javier Escalza
MF	4	(Spain) Ángel Villar
MF	8	(Spain) Javier Irureta
MF	10	(Spain) José Ignacio Churruca
FW	7	(Spain) Dani	(yellow card) 77'
FW	9	(Spain) Carlos		(substituted off) 80'
FW	11	(Spain) Txetxu Rojo	(yellow card) 45'
Substitutes:
DF	13	(Spain) Daniel Astrain		(substituted on) 38'
FW	15	(Spain) José María Amorrortu		(substituted on) 80'
Manager:
(Spain) Koldo Aguirre

MATCH RULES

- 90 minutes.
- 30 minutes of extra-time if necessary.
- Penalty shoot-out if scores still level.
- Four named substitutes.
- Maximum of two substitutions.
