= List of Real Betis players =

This is the list of notable footballers who have played for Real Betis Balompié. Generally, this means players that have played 100 or more first division matches for the club. However, some players who have played fewer matches are also included; this includes the club's founder members, first nationals at the club, and some players who fell short of the 100 total but made significant contributions to the club's history e.g. players who have set a club record such as the youngest player to score, top goalscorer in a season, first La Liga goal ever, etcetera.

Players are listed by nationality and then by beginning of career. Appearances are for first division matches only. Substitute appearances included. Statistics correct as of July 20, 2007.

== Notable players ==
Name	Nationality	Position	Real Betis career	Appearances	Goals
Alfredo Rojas	Argentina	Striker	1959–1961	47	18
Gabriel Calderón	Argentina	Midfielder	1983–1987	131	38
Nery Pumpido	Argentina	Goalkeeper	1988–1990	67	0
Daniel Aquino	Argentina	Striker	1993–1995	29	7
Vali Gasimov	Azerbaijan	Striker	1993–1995	42	9
Rafael Jacques	Brazil	Striker	1998–1999	4	1
Denílson de Oliveira Araújo *	Brazil	Midfielder	1998-2000; 2001-2005	165	12
Marcos Assunção	Brazil	Midfielder	2002–2007	137	23
Ricardo Oliveira	Brazil	Striker	2004–2006	46	27
Robert de Pinho de Souza	Brazil	Striker	2006–2007	48	16
Rafael Sóbis	Brazil	Striker	2006–2008	57	15
Luís Eduardo Schmidt	Brazil	Striker	2004–2009	136	36
Trifon Ivanov	Bulgaria	Defender	1990–1991	20	5
Patricio Yáñez	Chile	Midfielder	1987–1989	55	3
Mark González	Chile	Striker	2007–2009	44	10
Robert Jarni	Croatia	Midfielder	1995–1998	98	19
Nenad Bjelica	Croatia	Midfielder	1996–1998	30	2
Michal Bílek	Czech Republic	Midfielder	1990–1992	22	1
Benjamín Zarandona	Equatorial Guinea; Spain	Midfielder	1998–2007	144	7
Joey Guðjónsson	Iceland	Midfielder	2001–2004	12	0
Andrés Guardado	Mexico	Midfielder	2017–2024	178	4
Diego Lainez	Mexico	Midfielder	2019–2023	55	0
Finidi George	Nigeria	Midfielder	1996–2000	130	38
Carlos Diarte	Paraguay	Striker	1980–1983	75	29
Celso Ayala	Paraguay	Defender	1999	17	1
Wojciech Kowalczyk	Poland	Striker	1994–1998	62	14
Iulian Filipescu	Romania	Defender	1999–2003	127	8
Miroslav Karhan	Slovakia	Midfielder	1999–2000	32	2
Simón Lecue Andrade	Spain	Striker	1932–1935	55	24
Adolfo Martín González	Spain	Midfielder	1932–1936	49	12
Víctor Unamuno	Spain	Striker	1933–1936	55	29
Luis del Sol *	Spain	Midfielder	1954-1960; 1972-1973	57	6
Luis Aragonés	Spain	Striker	1961–1964	86	33
Francisco Bizcocho	Spain	Defender	1971–1981	236	2
Francisco Javier López García	Spain	Midfielder	1971–1982	226	25
Antonio Biosca	Spain	Defender	1971–1983	219	8
Antonio Benítez Fernández	Spain	Defender	1971–1983	203	14
Julio Cardeñosa	Spain	Midfielder	1974–1985	306	40
José Ramón Esnaola	Spain	Goalkeeper	1974–1985	303	0
Rafael Gordillo	Spain	Defender	1976–1985	237	18
Antolín Ortega	Spain	Defender	1979–1987	221	1
Al-Lal Mohamed Amar	Spain	Defender	1979–1987	206	2
Joaquín Parra	Spain	Midfielder	1980–1987	221	24
Antonio Casado Ruiz	Spain	Defender	1980–1987	120	4
Hipólito Rincón	Spain	Striker	1981–1989	223	78
José Ramón Romo	Spain	Midfielder	1981–1989	76	9
José Antonio Ruiz Palacios	Spain	Midfielder	1982–1988	81	6
Diego Rodríguez Fernández	Spain	Defender	1982–1988	198	4
Gabino Rodríguez Rodríguez	Spain	Midfielder	1983–1988	113	13
José Díaz Calleja	Spain	Defender	1983–1989	142	4
Antonio Reyes González	Spain	Midfielder	1984–1988	80	3
Sebastián Cruzado Fernández	Spain	Midfielder	1984–1991	137	11
Luis Miguel Gail	Spain	Midfielder	1986–1990	101	11
Juan Antonio Ureña	Spain	Defender	1986–1994	104	3
Ángel Cuéllar *	Spain	Midfielder	1990-1995; 1997-2000	84	15
Juan Merino	Spain	Defender	1990–2000	143	3
Tomás Olías	Spain	Defender	1994–1999	125	7
Jaime Quesada Chavarría	Spain	Defender	1994–1999	118	0
Juan José Cañas Gutiérrez	Spain	Midfielder	1994–2006	228	10
Pier Luigi Cherubino	Spain; Italy	Striker	1995–1997	71	23
Alfonso Pérez *	Spain	Striker	1995-2000; 2002-2005	197	67
Antonio Prats Cervera	Spain	Goalkeeper	1996–2005	244	2
Luis Fernández Gutiérrez	Spain	Defender	1996–2006	210	1
Fernando Varela Ramos	Spain	Defender	1996–2006	143	3
Oliverio Jesús Alvarez González	Spain	Striker	1997–2000	91	19
Diego Tristán	Spain	Striker	1998	0	0
Roberto López Ufarte	Spain; Morocco	Striker	1988–1989	28	3
Antonio Álvarez Pérez	Spain	Midfielder	1998–2004	162	5
Joaquín Sánchez	Spain	Midfielder	1999–2006	216	32
Daniel Martín	Spain	Striker	2001–2007	92	19
Pedro Contreras	Spain	Goalkeeper	2003–2007	55	0
Toni Doblas	Spain	Goalkeeper	1999–2008	76	0
Fernando Fernández	Spain	Striker	1999–2008	148	28
Johann Vogel	Switzerland	Midfielder	2006–2007	17	0
Tab Ramos	United States; Uruguay	Midfielder	1992–1995	18	0
Carlos Peruena	Uruguay	Midfielder	1979–1982	83	2
José Batlle Perdomo Teixeira	Uruguay	Midfielder	1990–1991	6	1
Faruk Hadžibegić	Yugoslavia	Defender	1985–1987	76	8
Vlada Stošić	Yugoslavia	Midfielder	1994–1996	72	7
Albert Nađ	Yugoslavia	Midfielder	1996–1998	56	1
Risto Vidaković	Yugoslavia	Defender	1994–2000	120	6

An asterisk (*) next to a name denotes that the player had more than one spell at the club.

== World Cup players ==
The following players have been selected by their country for the FIFA World Cup finals, while playing for Real Betis.

- (Spain) Simón Lecue (1934)
- (Spain) Julio Cardeñosa (1978)
- (Spain) Antonio Biosca (1978)
- (Spain) Rafael Gordillo (1982)
- (Spain) Hipólito Rincón (1986)
- (Argentina) Nery Pumpido (1990)
- (United States) Tabaré Ramos (1994)
- (Nigeria) Finidi George (1998)
- (Spain) Alfonso (1998)
- (Croatia) Robert Jarni (1998)
- (Spain) Joaquín (2002, 2006)
- (Brazil) Denílson (2002)
- (Spain) Juanito (2006)
- (Cameroon) Achille Emaná (2010)
- (Mexico) Andrés Guardado (2018, 2022)
- (Costa Rica) Joel Campbell (2018)
- (Argentina) Guido Rodríguez (2022)
- (Portugal) William Carvalho (2022)
- (Senegal) Youssouf Sabaly (2022)
