= Sebastián Alabanda =

Spanish footballer (1950–2014)

Personal information
- Full name: Sebastián Alabanda Fernández
- Date of birth: 31 October 1950
- Place of birth: Posadas, Spain
- Date of death: 10 June 2014 (aged 63)
- Place of death: Seville, Spain
- Height: 1.81 m (5 ft 11 in)
- Position: Midfielder

Youth career
- 1966–1969: Betis

Senior career*
Years	Team	Apps	(Gls)
1969–1972	Triana Balompié		
1972–1980	Betis	194	(16)
1973	→ Rayo Vallecano (loan)	7	(0)
1980–1982	Murcia	38	(3)
Total		239	(19)

International career
1974–1976	Spain amateur	7	(0)
1976	Spain	1	(0)
- * Club domestic league appearances and goals

Sebastián Alabanda Fernández (31 October 1950 – 10 June 2014) was a Spanish professional footballer who played as a midfielder.

== Club career ==
Born in Posadas, Province of Córdoba, Alabanda spent his first eight seasons as a senior with Real Betis, except for a short loan at Rayo Vallecano. With the former club, he made his debut in La Liga on 7 September 1974, starting in a 3–1 away loss against UD Las Palmas.

In 1976–77, Alabanda contributed 20 games to help the Andalusians finish fifth whilst winning the Copa del Rey, a penalty shootout win over Athletic Bilbao where he missed his attempt after a 2–2 regulation time draw. At the end of the following campaign, however, they suffered relegation to the Segunda División.

After leaving Betis in June 1980, with competitive totals of 229 matches and 19 goals, Alabanda signed with fellow top-flight team Real Murcia. He scored three goals in his first year, but could not help prevent relegation.

== International career ==
Alabanda earned one cap for Spain: on 24 April, he came on as a late substitute in a 1–1 friendly draw with West Germany in Madrid.

== Later life and death ==
After retiring, Alabanda worked in banking. On 29 May 2014, he returned to Betis as a counsellor, but died in his home in Seville on 10 June, at the age of 63.

== Honours ==
Betis

- Copa del Rey: 1976–77
- Segunda División: 1973–74
