= José Ramón Esnaola =

Spanish footballer (born 1946)

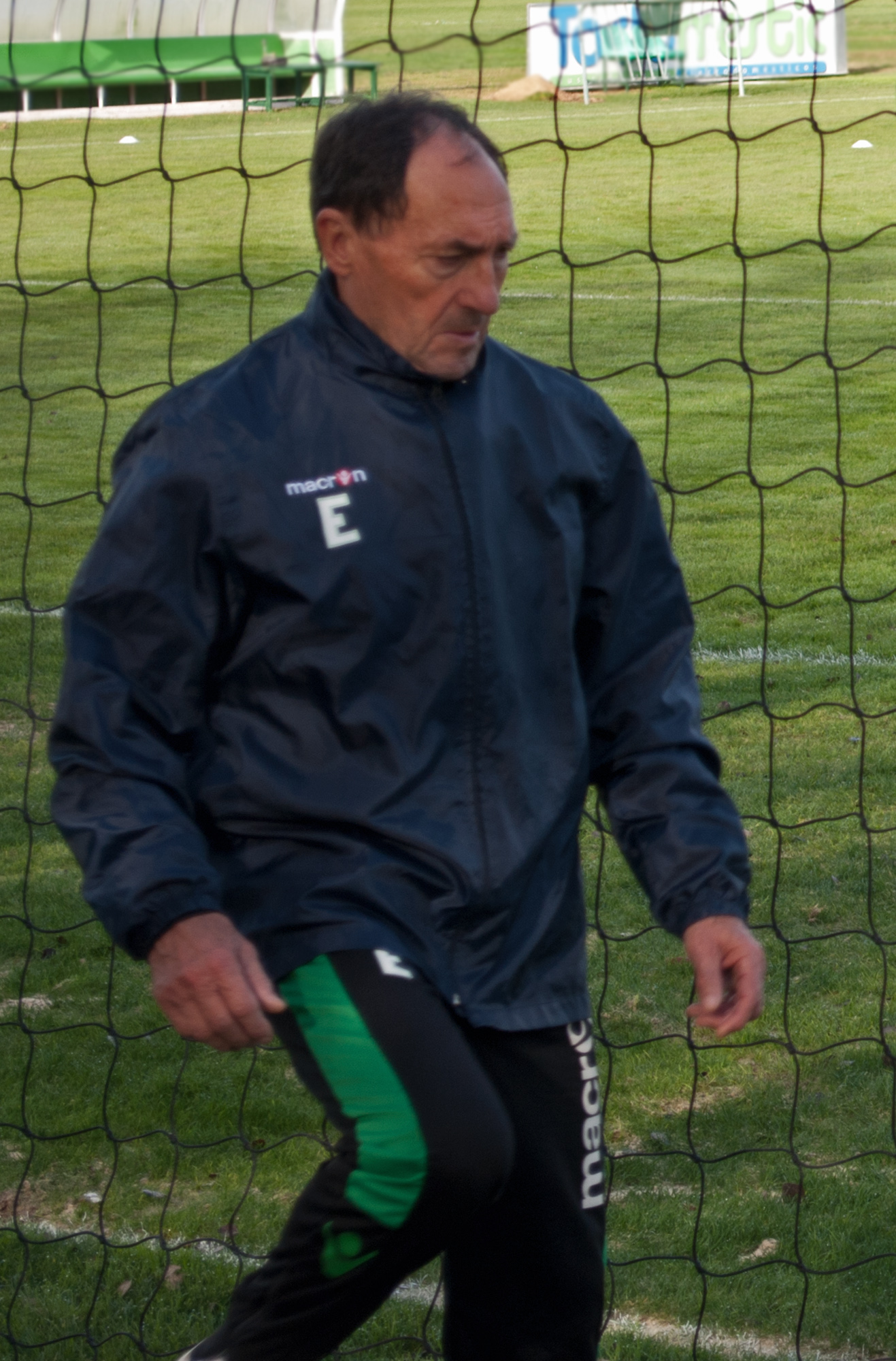
- Esnaola working with Betis

Personal information
- Full name: José Ramón Esnaola Laburu
- Date of birth: 30 June 1946 (age 80)
- Place of birth: Andoain, Spain
- Height: 1.76 m (5 ft 9 in)
- Position: Goalkeeper

Youth career
- Euskalduna Andoaindarra

Senior career*
| Years | Team | Apps | (Gls) |
| 1965–1973 | Real Sociedad | 181 | (0) |
| 1973–1985 | Betis | 378 | (0) |
| Total | | 559 | (0) |

Managerial career
- 1990–1992: Betis B
- 1991: Betis
- 1993: Betis
- 1993–2000: Betis B
- * Club domestic league appearances and goals

José Ramón Esnaola Laburu (born 30 June 1946) is a Spanish former professional footballer who played as a goalkeeper.

He spent 40 years at the service of Betis, making 460 competitive appearances and later working with the club in various capacities.

== Club career ==
Esnaola was born in Andoain, Gipuzkoa. He played for Real Sociedad and Real Betis, with 16 of his 20 professional seasons being spent in La Liga. At that level, he appeared in 166 league matches with the first club and 303 with the second, for which he signed in 1973 for 12 million pesetas as it was in the Segunda División; with the former, he started initially as backup to Adolfo Arriaga, but won first-choice status as Arriaga became severely ill after shattering his pancreas during a game against UP Langreo.

In Esnaola's first year, the Andalusians returned to the top division as champions and with the best defensive record in the competition. In the 1977 final of the Copa del Rey, against another Basque side, Athletic Bilbao, he claimed his only major honour in an epic match: 2–2 after regulation and 8–7 in the penalty shootout, where he stopped three shots and scored the winner, beating counterpart José Ángel Iribar; Betis were relegated at the end of the following campaign.

Esnaola retired in 1985, at the age of 39. He then managed Betis in two brief spells, the first in 1990–91 which finished in top-flight relegation. In 2007 he returned to the club, now as goalkeepers' coach, retiring altogether six years later.

== International career ==
Esnaola was never a Spanish international, only receiving one callup whilst at Real Sociedad.

== Honours ==
Betis

- Copa del Rey: 1976–77
- Segunda División: 1973–74

== See also ==
- List of La Liga players (400+ appearances)
- List of Real Betis players (+100 appearances)
