= José Antonio Eulate =

Spanish footballer and coach

Personal information
- Full name: José Antonio Gómez Álvarez de Eulate
- Date of birth: 10 May 1955 (age 71)
- Place of birth: Salamanca, Spain
- Height: 1.85 m (6 ft 1 in)
- Position: Forward

Youth career
- Santa Marta

Senior career*
Years	Team	Apps	(Gls)
1973–1975	Ponferradina	42	(9)
1975–1979	Betis	44	(7)
1979	→ Recreativo (loan)	9	(2)
1979–1982	Levante	96	(13)
1982–1984	Albacete	36	(7)
1984–1989	Ponferradina	125	(75)
Total		342	(113)

Managerial career
- 1991–1992: Atlético Bembibre
- ?–?: As Pontes
- 1994–1995: Ponferradina
- 2001–2002: Atlético Bembibre
- * Club domestic league appearances and goals

José Antonio Gómez Álvarez de Eulate (born 10 May 1955) is a Spanish retired football forward and coach.

== Playing career ==
Born in Salamanca, Region of León, Eulate moved to Ponferrada at the age of two and was a CD Santa Marta youth graduate. After making his debut as a senior with SD Ponferradina in 1973, he joined La Liga club Real Betis in January 1975. He was yielded in Jerez Industrial C.F.

Eulate was rarely used by the Andalusians during his spell, but was part of the squad that won the Copa del Rey in 1977 against Athletic Bilbao, playing the second half of extra time and converting his penalty shootout attempt (8–7 win in Madrid). In January 1979, he was loaned to neighbouring Recreativo de Huelva also in the top tier, and after suffering relegation he signed for Segunda División team Levante UD.

Eulate was an ever-present figure for the Valencian side, experiencing another relegation in 1982. After two seasons at Albacete Balompié, in Segunda División B, he returned to his first club Ponferradina, retiring in 1989 at the age of 34.

== Coaching career ==
After retiring, Eulate worked as a manager, his first stop being at CA Bembibre in Tercera División, in 1991. After another spell at CD As Pontes, he was named Ponferradina coach in 1994.

Dismissed in October 1995, Eulate returned to Atlético Bembibre in 2001.

== Honours ==
Betis

- Copa del Rey: 1976–77
