= Diego Rodríguez (footballer, born 1960) =

Spanish footballer (born 1960)

Diego
Personal information
- Full name: Diego Rodríguez Fernández
- Date of birth: 20 April 1960 (age 66)
- Place of birth: La Orotava, Spain
- Height: 1.79 m (5 ft 10 in)
- Position: Centre-back

Youth career
- 1970–1977: Vera
- 1977–1978: Tenerife

Senior career*
Years	Team	Apps	(Gls)
1978–1982	Tenerife	113	(2)
1982–1988	Betis	198	(4)
1988–1996	Sevilla	252	(7)
1996–1998	Albacete	46	(2)
1998–2002	Dos Hermanas	110	(3)
Total		719	(18)

International career
1980–1981	Spain U20	2	(0)
1980–1984	Spain U21	13	(0)
1982–1987	Spain U23	7	(0)
1984	Spain amateur	1	(0)
1988	Spain	1	(0)

Managerial career
- 2002: Ciudad Murcia (assistant)
- 2002: Ciudad Murcia
- 2003: Linense
- 2008–2009: Sevilla C
- 2009–2010: Sevilla B
- * Club domestic league appearances and goals

Diego Rodríguez Fernández (born 20 April 1960), known simply as Diego, is a Spanish former professional footballer who played as a central defender.

In a professional career that spanned more than two decades, he played for both Seville clubs, Betis and Sevilla, appearing in a total of 450 La Liga matches.

== Club career ==
Diego was born in La Orotava, Tenerife. Having started professionally at local CD Tenerife he signed with Real Betis for the 1982–83 season, going on to play nearly 250 official matches and score four La Liga goals.

After six years, Diego joined Andalusia neighbours Sevilla FC, being an undisputed starter – as well as team captain, which he also was at Betis – almost until his final campaign, 1995–96. His lowest output with the club consisted of 24 games in 1994–95, starting in all his appearances as the side qualified for the UEFA Cup as fifth.

Diego retired professionally in June 1998 at the age of 38, after competing in the Segunda División with Albacete Balompié, but still played well into his 40s with another side in his region of adoption, amateurs Dos Hermanas CF. In early 2002, immediately after quitting football, he began his coaching career, acting as assistant to Alfonso Guzmán at Segunda División B's Ciudad de Murcia but replacing him for the final ten matches of the season.

In 2008, Diego returned to Sevilla, starting with the C team and upgrading the following year to the reserves. His first game in charge of the latter was a 8–0 away loss against Hércules CF in the second tier, and on 16 February 2010 he was dismissed.

== International career ==
Diego earned one cap for the Spain national team, appearing in the second half of a 2–1 friendly loss with Czechoslovakia on 24 February 1988, in Málaga. He was subsequently picked for the squad that appeared at that year's UEFA European Championship.

== See also ==
- List of La Liga players (400+ appearances)
- List of Real Betis players (+100 appearances)
