= 1975–76 Segunda División =

45th season of the second-tier football league in Spain

Segunda División
- Season: 1975–76
- Dates: 7 September 1975 – 27 June 1976
- Champions: Burgos (1st title)
- Promoted: Celta de Vigo; Málaga
- Relegated: Murcia; Ensidesa; Osasuna; Gimnástico de Tarragona
- Matches: 380
- Goals: 881 (2.32 per match)
- Top goalscorer: Antonio Illán; Antonio Burguete (19 goals)

The 1975–76 Segunda División season saw 20 teams participate in the second flight Spanish league. Burgos won the league. Burgos, Celta de Vigo and CD Málaga were promoted to Primera División. Real Murcia, CD Ensidesa, CA Osasuna and Gimnàstic de Tarragona were relegated to Tercera División.

== Teams ==
Location of teams in Segunda División 1975-76
Canary Islands

Club	City	Stadium
Alavés	Vitoria	Mendizorrotza
Barcelona Atlètic	Barcelona	Fabra i Coats
Burgos	Burgos	El Plantío
Cádiz	Cádiz	Ramón de Carranza
Calvo Sotelo	Puertollano	Calvo Sotelo
Castellón	Castellón de la Plana	Castalia
Celta Vigo	Vigo	Balaídos
Córdoba	Córdoba	El Árcangel
Deportivo La Coruña	La Coruña	Riazor
Ensidesa	Avilés	Santa Bárbara
Gimnástico de Tarragona	Tarragona	José Luis Calderón
Málaga	Málaga	La Rosaleda
Murcia	Murcia	La Condomina
Osasuna	Pamplona	El Sadar
Rayo Vallecano	Madrid	Vallehermoso
Recreativo Huelva	Huelva	Municipal
San Andrés	Barcelona	Calle Santa Coloma
Tarrasa	Terrassa	Olímpic de Terrassa
Tenerife	Santa Cruz de Tenerife	Heliodoro Rodríguez López
Real Valladolid	Valladolid	José Zorrilla

== Final table ==
Pos	Team	Pld	W	D	L	GF	GA	GD	Pts	Promotion or relegation
1	Burgos	38	20	11	7	54	31	+23	51	Promoted to Primera División
2	Celta de Vigo	38	19	11	8	42	22	+20	49	Promoted to Primera División
3	CD Málaga	38	21	5	12	75	39	+36	47	Promoted to Primera División
4	Real Valladolid	38	16	11	11	44	27	+17	43	
5	Deportivo de La Coruña	38	18	6	14	47	36	+11	42	
6	Barcelona Atlètic	38	13	15	10	46	47	−1	41	
7	CD Tenerife	38	14	12	12	50	44	+6	40	
8	Córdoba CF	38	16	6	16	48	48	0	38	
9	Rayo Vallecano	38	16	4	18	48	49	−1	36	
10	Recreativo de Huelva	38	13	10	15	35	42	−7	36	
11	CF Calvo Sotelo	38	13	10	15	42	51	−9	36	
12	CD Castellón	38	12	12	14	45	47	−2	36	
13	Cádiz CF	38	13	9	16	46	43	+3	35	Relegation playoff
14	CD San Andrés	38	14	7	17	38	45	−7	35	Relegation playoff
15	Deportivo Alavés	38	12	10	16	33	46	−13	34	Relegation playoff
16	Tarrasa CF	38	12	10	16	35	45	−10	34	Relegation playoff
17	Real Murcia	38	14	5	19	46	61	−15	33	Relegated to Tercera División
18	CD Ensidesa	38	11	11	16	31	46	−15	33	Relegated to Tercera División
19	CA Osasuna	38	14	5	19	47	58	−11	33	Relegated to Tercera División
20	Gimnástico de Tarragona	38	10	8	20	29	54	−25	28	Relegated to Tercera División

Source: BDFutbol

== Results ==
Home \ Away	ALV	BAR	BUR	CÁD	CAL	CAS	CEL	CÓR	DEP	ENS	GIM	MGA	MUR	OSA	RAY	REC	SAN	TAR	TEN	VLD
Alavés	—	0–1	1–1	2–1	1–1	2–2	0–0	2–0	2–0	1–0	2–1	1–0	1–1	1–0	2–0	0–1	0–0	1–0	1–0	1–0
Barcelona At.	3–0	—	0–0	0–0	0–0	3–1	1–1	2–2	1–0	4–1	2–1	1–6	4–1	3–2	0–0	3–2	1–1	2–1	3–3	0–1
Burgos	2–0	1–1	—	2–1	3–1	5–1	0–0	3–1	1–0	1–0	4–1	1–0	2–0	3–1	2–1	1–1	1–1	1–0	2–1	1–1
Cádiz	2–0	0–0	0–2	—	2–0	2–0	1–0	3–0	2–0	2–0	0–0	3–3	2–0	0–0	2–0	2–0	1–0	1–2	2–2	3–1
Calvo Sotelo	2–1	0–2	2–2	3–1	—	2–1	1–2	1–0	0–0	2–2	2–0	2–1	2–3	2–2	1–0	0–0	2–0	2–1	1–0	1–0
Castellón	1–1	1–1	1–0	2–2	3–0	—	1–1	0–0	1–1	0–0	3–0	0–0	2–0	2–0	0–1	3–1	3–0	1–0	1–2	1–0
Celta de Vigo	2–0	1–0	0–1	3–1	1–2	3–1	—	2–0	1–1	1–0	2–0	0–0	3–0	2–0	2–2	1–0	1–0	2–0	0–1	1–0
Córdoba	2–1	3–0	3–2	1–0	1–0	2–4	1–0	—	2–1	3–1	3–1	0–2	1–0	3–0	4–0	1–1	3–0	0–1	1–0	1–1
Deportivo La Coruña	2–1	5–0	0–1	1–0	3–2	2–0	2–0	2–1	—	2–0	2–0	0–0	2–3	0–0	1–0	2–0	2–0	2–0	4–2	1–0
Ensidesa	0–0	0–1	0–1	2–2	1–1	1–0	0–0	1–0	3–2	—	2–1	2–1	0–1	4–0	1–0	0–0	1–0	2–1	0–0	0–0
Gimnástico Tarragona	0–0	3–1	1–1	0–1	0–0	0–0	0–2	0–1	1–0	0–2	—	1–0	1–0	3–1	4–3	1–0	2–0	2–0	0–1	1–1
Málaga	6–2	2–0	1–0	3–1	2–0	1–2	0–1	2–2	2–0	2–0	4–0	—	5–2	2–0	1–0	3–0	3–0	3–0	3–0	1–2
Murcia	2–1	0–2	2–0	3–1	4–1	2–1	1–1	1–0	0–1	2–0	1–0	1–5	—	2–1	3–1	0–1	3–1	1–2	1–1	0–2
Osasuna	3–0	2–0	2–1	3–2	2–2	2–1	0–1	3–0	1–0	2–3	0–1	6–2	2–1	—	2–1	4–1	1–0	1–1	1–0	2–1
Rayo Vallecano	2–1	1–0	2–2	1–0	2–1	3–0	0–2	1–0	1–2	5–1	4–0	2–4	2–1	2–0	—	1–0	2–0	3–0	2–1	0–1
Recreativo Huelva	2–0	1–1	0–2	1–0	1–0	4–1	2–2	3–1	1–0	1–0	2–2	0–1	0–0	1–0	2–1	—	2–0	1–1	2–0	0–0
San Andrés	1–0	2–1	0–0	3–2	0–2	1–0	2–0	1–1	1–0	5–0	3–0	0–2	4–0	2–0	4–0	1–0	—	2–1	1–1	1–0
Tarrasa	0–1	1–1	0–2	1–0	1–0	2–4	0–0	1–0	0–0	1–1	1–0	4–1	2–2	1–0	0–0	3–1	1–1	—	2–0	1–0
Tenerife	3–3	1–1	2–0	1–1	2–1	0–0	0–1	0–3	5–1	0–0	2–0	2–1	2–1	3–1	2–0	2–0	3–0	3–1	—	1–1
Valladolid	2–0	0–0	2–0	1–0	4–0	0–0	1–0	5–1	1–3	1–0	1–1	1–0	2–1	4–0	0–2	2–0	3–0	1–1	1–1	—

Source: BDFutbol
Legend: Blue = home team win; Yellow = draw; Red = away team win.

== Relegation playoff ==
Home Matches:
SD Huesca	1-1	CD San Andrés
Tarrasa CF	1-1	AD Almería	AD Almería disqualified for fielding ineligible players
Cádiz CF	3-0	Barakaldo CF
Deportivo Alavés	3-1	CD Logroñés

Away Matches:
CD San Andrés	2-1	SD Huesca	Agg:3-2
Barakaldo CF	3-2	Cádiz CF	Agg:3-5
CD Logroñés	1-1	Deportivo Alavés	Agg:2-4

== Pichichi Trophy for top goalscorers ==
Goalscorers	Goals	Team
(Spain) Antonio Illán	19	CD Tenerife
(Spain) Antonio Burguete	19	Córdoba CF
(Argentina) Daniel Quevedo	17	CD Málaga
(Argentina) José Juan Cioffi	16	CD Castellón
