= Lucien Muller =

French footballer (1934–2026)

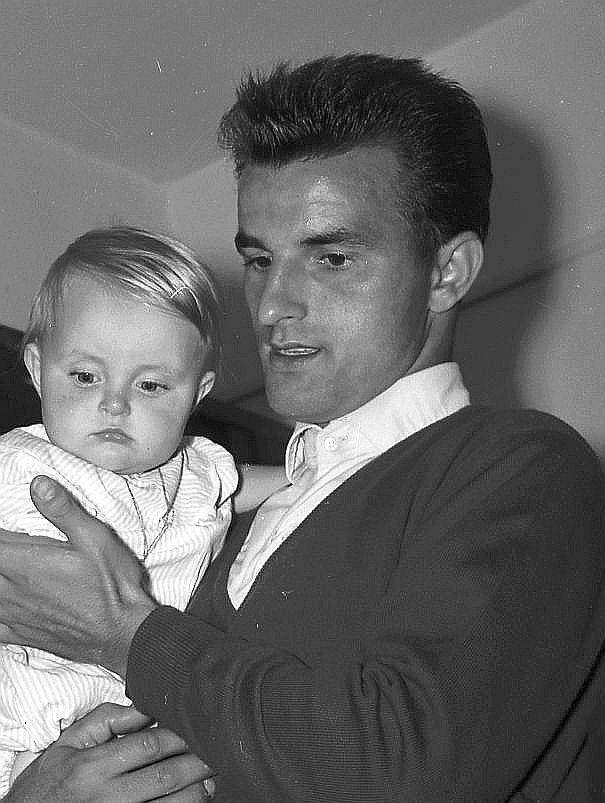
- Muller in 1959

Personal information
- Full name: Lucien Muller
- Date of birth: 3 September 1934
- Place of birth: Bischwiller, France
- Date of death: 20 January 2026 (aged 91)
- Place of death: Nice, France
- Height: 1.75 m (5 ft 9 in)
- Position: Midfielder

Youth career
- FC Bischwiller

Senior career*
Years	Team	Apps	(Gls)
1953–1957	Strasbourg	79	(17)
1957–1959	Toulouse	69	(19)
1959–1962	Reims	107	(19)
1962–1965	Real Madrid	77	(2)
1965–1968	Barcelona	68	(3)
1968–1970	Reims	36	(5)
Total		436	(65)

International career
1959–1966	France	16	(3)

Managerial career
- 1970–1974: Castellón
- 1975–1976: Burgos
- 1976–1977: Zaragoza
- 1977–1978: Burgos
- 1978–1979: Barcelona
- 1979–1981: Burgos
- 1981–1983: Mallorca
- 1983–1986: Monaco
- 1987–1988: Mallorca
- 1991: Castellón
- * Club domestic league appearances and goals

Lucien Muller (3 September 1934 – 20 January 2026) was a French football player and manager who played as an inside forward and later as a midfielder.

== Career ==
Born in Bischwiller, Muller started out in Alsace, his native region, and then made a name for himself with the Stade de Reims, that he was twice crowned French champion. He then moved to Real Madrid replacing Luis del Sol, where he appeared in the European Cup final in 1964 where he was the best player. He won the league three times with Real Madrid. In 1965 he moved to FC Barcelona, becoming the first French player to play for both Barcelona and Real Madrid. There he won the 1965–66 Inter-Cities Fairs Cup and the 1967–68 Copa del Generalísimo. Although he was touted as the successor to Raymond Kopa (and was nicknamed "Little Kopa"), his performances in the French kit never matched his club performances. He was nevertheless part of the French team that participated in the 1966 FIFA World Cup but did not play. He scored 3 goals in 16 games for France. He returned to Reims, where he ended his career.

He briefly returned to Barcelona as a coach in the late 1970s, leading the club to the European Cup Winners' Cup Final, before being replaced by Joaquim Rifé. He later trained AS Monaco, RCD Mallorca and CD Castellón. He won the 1984–85 Coupe de France with AS Monaco.

== Death ==
Muller died on 20 January 2026, at the age of 91.
