= Antonio Biosca =

Spanish footballer

Personal information
- Full name: Antonio Biosca Pérez
- Date of birth: 8 December 1948 (age 77)
- Place of birth: Almería, Spain
- Height: 1.73 m (5 ft 8 in)
- Position: Defender

Youth career
- Baleares
- San Quintín
- Plus Ultra Almería

Senior career*
Years	Team	Apps	(Gls)
1968–1971	Calvo Sotelo	27	(2)
1971–1983	Betis	284	(18)
Total		311	(20)

International career
1975–1976	Spain amateur	4	(0)
1978	Spain	3	(0)
- * Club domestic league appearances and goals

Antonio Biosca Pérez (born 8 December 1948) is a Spanish former professional footballer who played as a defender.

He appeared in 220 La Liga matches over ten seasons (eight goals), with Betis, and represented Spain at the 1978 World Cup.

== Club career ==
Born in Almería, Andalusia, Biosca made his senior debut in 1968–69 in the Segunda División, appearing rarely for CD Calvo Sotelo who finished in sixth position. In summer 1971 he moved to La Liga with Real Betis, making his debut in the competition on 28 November 1971 in a 3–1 away loss against Córdoba CF, finishing his first year with 17 games played (15 starts) and being relegated the following campaign.

From 1974 to 1978, Biosca never featured in less than 30 league matches for the Verdiblancos, winning the 1977 edition of the Copa del Rey but also suffering relegation the following year. He retired in June 1983 at age 33, and settled in Seville, losing all connection to the football world.

== International career ==
Biosca earned three caps for Spain in 1978, and represented his country at that year's FIFA World Cup. His debut came on 26 April, in a friendly with Mexico in Granada.

In the final stages in Argentina, Biosca made two appearances as the national team conceded no goals, albeit in a group-stage exit.

== Honours ==
Betis

- Copa del Rey: 1976–77
- Segunda División: 1973–74
