= Francisco Bizcocho =

Spanish footballer

Personal information
- Full name: Francisco Bizcocho Estévez
- Date of birth: 22 January 1951 (age 75)
- Place of birth: Coria del Río, Spain
- Height: 1.73 m (5 ft 8 in)
- Position: Right-back

Youth career
- Betis

Senior career*
Years	Team	Apps	(Gls)
1969–1971	Triana Balompié	63	(0)
1971–1982	Betis	285	(3)
1982–1983	Coria	2	(0)
Total		350	(3)

International career
1973–1974	Spain amateur	2	(0)
- * Club domestic league appearances and goals

Francisco Bizcocho Estévez (born 22 January 1951) is a Spanish former professional footballer who played as a right-back.

== Club career ==
Born in Coria del Río, Province of Seville, Bizcocho all but played his entire career with local Real Betis, nine of his 14 seasons being spent in La Liga. He made his debut in the competition on 5 September 1971 in a 2–0 away loss against Real Madrid, and finished his first year with 31 appearances (30 as starter) to help the Andalusians to the 13th place.

In 1976–77, Bizcocho took part in 27 matches as Betis finished fifth, and scored the decisive penalty in the final of the Copa del Rey, an 8–7 shootout win over Athletic Bilbao. The team suffered relegation in the following campaign, however.

Bizcocho retired from football in June 1983 at the age of 32, with top-flight totals of 235 games and two goals.

== Honours ==
- Copa del Rey: 1976–77
- Segunda División: 1973–74
