= Antonio Benítez (footballer, born 1951) =

Spanish footballer (1951–2014)

Personal information
- Full name: Antonio Benítez Fernández
- Date of birth: 2 June 1951
- Place of birth: Jerez de la Frontera, Spain
- Date of death: 19 February 2014 (aged 62)
- Place of death: Jerez de la Frontera, Spain
- Height: 1.70 m (5 ft 7 in)
- Position: Left back

Youth career
- Xerez

Senior career*
| Years | Team | Apps | (Gls) |
| 1968–1970 | Xerez | 49 | (3) |
| 1970–1984 | Betis | 303 | (24) |
| Total | | 352 | (27) |

International career
| 1974 | Spain amateur | 1 | (0) |
| 1974–1977 | Spain | 3 | (0) |
- * Club domestic league appearances and goals

Antonio Benítez Fernández (2 June 1951 – 19 February 2014) was a Spanish footballer who played as a left back.

== Club career ==
Born in Jerez de la Frontera, Province of Cádiz, Benítez started his career with local Xerez CD in the third division. In 1970, he joined Andalusia neighbours Real Betis, immediately achieving promotion to La Liga as champions.

Benítez made his debut in the top level on 3 October 1971 in a 0–2 away loss against Valencia CF, and finished the season with 28 games and one goal as the Verdiblancos ranked in 13th position, being relegated the following campaign. Late into the decade, he would win the 1977 Copa del Rey, suffer another top flight relegation with his main club in 1978 and achieve immediate promotion back; during his early seasons, he played as a left winger.

Benítez retired from football in June 1984 at the age of 33, after only one game in two seasons combined with Betis. He appeared in more than 300 official matches for the club, and later worked in its youth system.

== International career ==
Benítez earned three caps for Spain in as many years, courtesy of manager László Kubala. His debut occurred on 12 October 1974 in a 1–1 friendly with Argentina, in Buenos Aires.

== Death ==
On 19 February 2014, Benítez died in his hometown. He was 62 years old.

== Honours ==
Betis

- Copa del Rey: 1976–77
- Segunda División: 1970–71
