= Francisco López (footballer, born 1950) =

Spanish footballer

Personal information
- Full name: Francisco Javier López García
- Date of birth: 14 October 1950 (age 76)
- Place of birth: Laredo, Spain
- Height: 1.74 m (5 ft 9 in)
- Position: Midfielder

Senior career*
Years	Team	Apps	(Gls)
1970–1982	Betis	316	(31)
1982–1983	Mallorca	32	(6)
1983–1984	Granada	30	(2)

International career
1977	Spain	1	(0)
- * Club domestic league appearances and goals

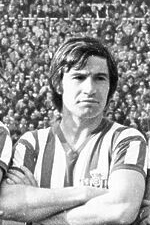

Francisco Javier López García (born 14 October 1950 in Laredo, Cantabria) is a Spanish retired footballer who played as a midfielder.

== Football career ==
During his early career, López played for Gimnástica de Torrelavega (1967–69), Racing de Santander (1969–70) and Real Betis (1970–82). He appeared in nine La Liga seasons with the last club, amassing totals of 266 games and 25 goals.

In 1976–77, López netted twice in 34 matches to help the Andalusians finish fifth whilst winning the Copa del Rey, a penalty shootout win against Athletic Bilbao where he scored both of his team's goals in a 2–2 regulation time draw. Shortly after, on 21 September 1977, he gained his first and only cap for Spain, playing the last six minutes in a 2–1 away friendly win with Switzerland, but would suffer club relegation at the end of the subsequent campaign.

López retired in June 1984 at almost 34, after one season apiece with RCD Mallorca and Granada CF, both in the second division.
