= Burgos CF (1936) =

Spanish football club

Burgos
- Full name: Burgos Club de Fútbol
- Founded: 3 May 1936
- Dissolved: 13 August 1983
- Ground: El Plantío, Burgos, Castile and León, Spain
- Capacity: 13,468
Away colours

Burgos Club de Fútbol was a Spanish football club based in Burgos, in the autonomous community of Castile and León. Founded in 1936, it managed six seasons in the first division, mainly in the late 1970s.

Due to serious economic debts, it disappeared in 1983. Two years later, José María Quintano, a local entrepreneur, decided to refound the club with the same name, and in 1994, it started competing again in the regional leagues, completely independent from its predecessor.

== Season to season ==
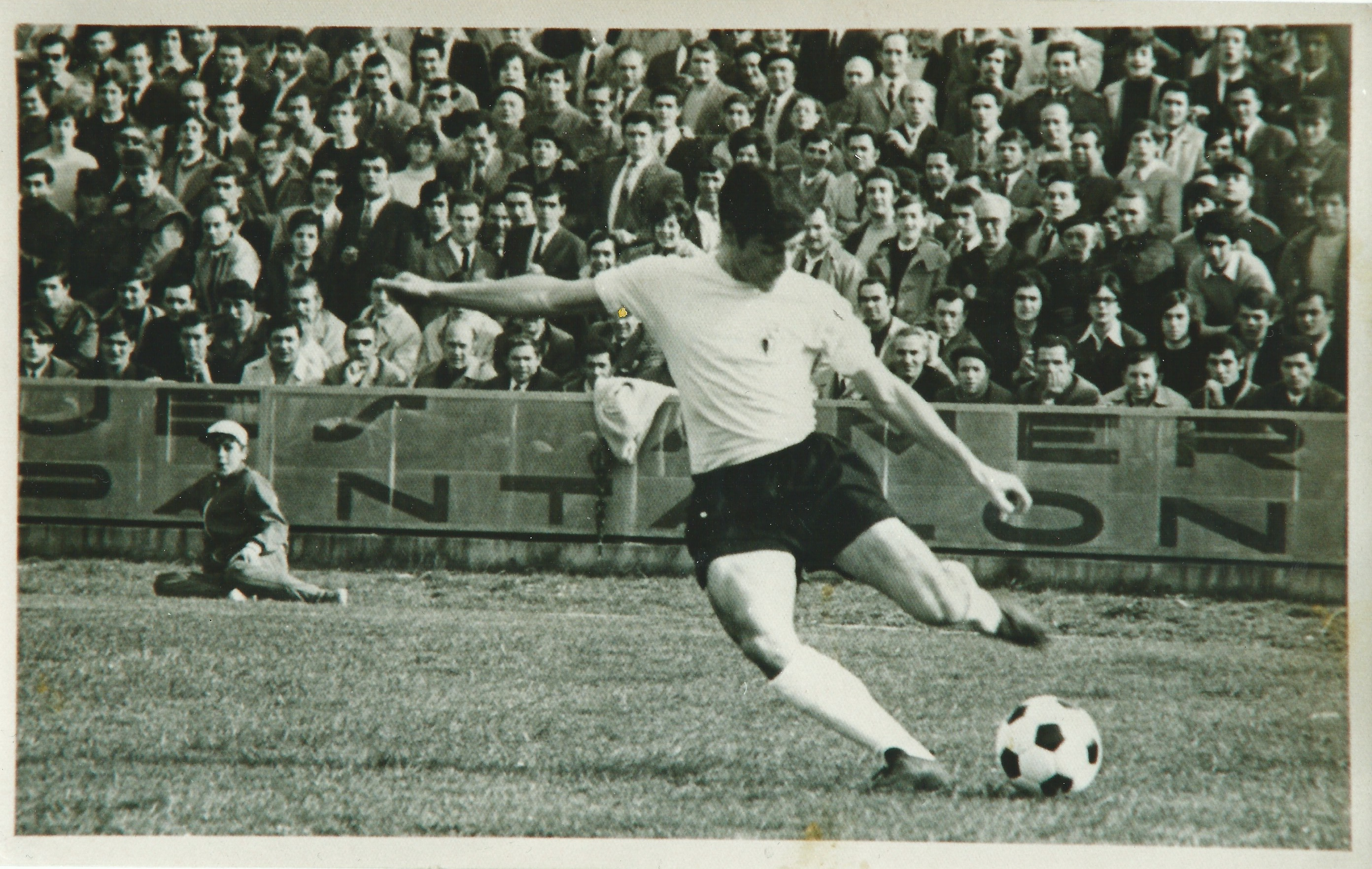
Rufino Requejo with Burgos CF

Season	Tier	Division	Place	Copa del Rey
1943–44	3	3ª	4th	
1944–45	3	3ª	2nd	
1945–46	3	3ª	7th	
1946–47	3	3ª	1st	
1947–48	3	3ª	3rd	
1948–49	3	3ª	11th	
1949–50	3	3ª	18th	
1950–51	3	3ª	3rd	
1951–52	3	3ª	1st	
1952–53	2	2ª	16th	
1953–54	3	3ª	8th	
1954–55	3	3ª	1st	
1955–56	3	3ª	1st	
1956–57	2	2ª	19th	

Season	Tier	Division	Place	Copa del Rey
1957–58	3	3ª	2nd	
1958–59	3	3ª	7th	
1959–60	3	3ª	1st	
1960–61	3	3ª	2nd	
1961–62	2	2ª	11th	
1962–63	2	2ª	10th	
1963–64	2	2ª	7th	
1964–65	2	2ª	6th	
1965–66	2	2ª	5th	
1966–67	2	2ª	14th	
1967–68	2	2ª	8th	
1968–69	2	2ª	12th	
1969–70	2	2ª	14th	
1970–71	2	2ª	2nd	

Season	Tier	Division	Place	Copa del Rey
1971–72	1	1ª	15th	
1972–73	1	1ª	18th	
1973–74	2	2ª	16th	
1974–75	2	2ª	9th	
1975–76	2	2ª	1st	
1976–77	1	1ª	14th	
1977–78	1	1ª	12th	
1978–79	1	1ª	13th	
1979–80	1	1ª	17th	Fourth round
1980–81	2	2ª	15th	Quarter-finals
1981–82	2	2ª	9th	First round
1982–83	3	2ª B	3rd	Second round

- 6 seasons in La Liga
- 17 seasons in Segunda División
- 1 season in Segunda División B
- 16 seasons in Tercera División (third tier)

== Famous players ==
- (Croatia) Sergije Krešić
- (Serbia) Ilija Katić
- (Spain) Juanito
- (Spain) Miguel Ángel Portugal

== Famous coaches ==
- (France) Marcel Domingo
- (France) Lucien Muller
