= Julio Cardeñosa =

Spanish footballer

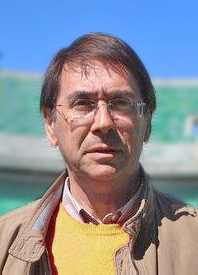
- Cardeñosa in 2017

Personal information
- Full name: Julio Cardeñosa Rodríguez
- Date of birth: 27 October 1949 (age 77)
- Place of birth: Valladolid, Spain
- Height: 1.70 m (5 ft 7 in)
- Position: Midfielder

Youth career
- San Fernando
- Arandina
- Valladolid

Senior career*
Years	Team	Apps	(Gls)
1969–1971	Europa Delicias		
1971–1974	Valladolid	90	(12)
1974–1985	Betis	338	(42)
Total		428	(54)

International career
1973–1975	Spain amateur	6	(2)
1977–1980	Spain	8	(0)

Managerial career
- 1989–1990: Betis B
- 1990: Betis
- 1992: Córdoba
- 1994–1995: San Roque
- 1997–1999: Écija
- * Club domestic league appearances and goals

Julio Cardeñosa Rodríguez (born 27 October 1949) is a Spanish former professional footballer who played as a central midfielder.

He represented mainly Betis during his career, winning the 1976–77 Copa del Rey with the club. He appeared for the Spain national team in one World Cup and one European Championship.

== Club career ==
Born in Valladolid, Castile and León, Cardeñosa arrived at Real Betis from local Real Valladolid in 1974, and remained there until his retirement. Left-footed, he possessed great technical ability which belied his thin physical build, and made 412 competitive appearances for the Andalusians (307 in ten La Liga seasons), helping the club to lift the Copa del Rey in 1977.

Cardeñosa retired at age 35, then took up coaching mainly in the region. He started as a youth manager at Betis, and had two meaningless stints with the first team, including in 1990–91's top flight – seven matches, eventual relegation.

Cardeñosa returned to Betis in 2010, as part of newly appointed manager Pepe Mel's coaching staff.

== International career ==
Cardeñosa earned eight caps for Spain. His debut came on 30 November 1977 in a 1978 FIFA World Cup qualifier against Yugoslavia, playing the full 90 minutes in the decisive 1–0 away win.

Cardeñosa was subsequently picked for the final stages in Argentina. There, he notoriously missed an open goal chance in the group stage against Brazil in an eventual 0–0 draw, with Spain being eliminated precisely by the South Americans. He also represented the nation at UEFA Euro 1980.

== Honours ==
Betis

- Copa del Rey: 1976–77
