= 1973–74 Segunda División =

43rd season of the second-tier football league in Spain

Segunda División
- Season: 1973–74
- Dates: 1 September 1973 – 16 June 1974
- Champions: Real Betis (5th title)
- Promoted: Hércules; Salamanca
- Relegated: Osasuna; Deportivo La Coruña; Levante; Linares
- Matches: 380
- Goals: 910 (2.39 per match)
- Top goalscorer: Baena (22 goals)

The 1973–74 Segunda División season saw 20 teams participate in the second flight Spanish league. Real Betis won the league. Real Betis, Hércules CF and UD Salamanca were promoted to Primera División. CA Osasuna, Deportivo de La Coruña, Levante UD and Linares were relegated to Tercera División.

== Teams ==
Location of teams in Segunda División 1973-74
Canary Islands

Club	City	Stadium
Baracaldo	Barakaldo	Lasesarre
Betis	Seville	Benito Villamarín
Burgos	Burgos	El Plantío
Cádiz	Cádiz	Ramón de Carranza
Córdoba	Córdoba	El Árcangel
Deportivo	La Coruña	Riazor
Gimnástico de Tarragona	Tarragona	José Luis Calderón
Hércules	Alicante	La Viña
Levante	Valencia	Nuevo Estadio
Linares	Linares	Linarejos
Mallorca	Palma de Mallorca	Lluís Sitjar
Orense	Ourense	José Antonio
Osasuna	Pamplona	El Sadar
Rayo Vallecano	Madrid	Vallehermoso
Sabadell	Sabadell	Nova Creu Alta
Salamanca	Salamanca	Helmántico
San Andrés	Barcelona	Calle Santa Coloma
Sevilla	Seville	Ramón Sánchez Pizjuán
Tenerife	Santa Cruz de Tenerife	Heliodoro Rodríguez López
Real Valladolid	Valladolid	José Zorrilla

== Final table ==
Pos	Team	Pld	W	D	L	GF	GA	GD	Pts	Promotion or relegation
1	Real Betis	38	19	13	6	69	31	+38	51	Promoted to Primera División
2	Hércules CF	38	20	9	9	51	34	+17	49	Promoted to Primera División
3	UD Salamanca	38	20	8	10	53	39	+14	48	Promoted to Primera División
4	CD Tenerife	38	19	8	11	57	41	+16	46	
5	Cádiz CF	38	18	10	10	52	37	+15	46	
6	Gimnástico de Tarragona	38	16	9	13	46	40	+6	41	
7	Real Valladolid	38	16	9	13	61	50	+11	41	
8	CD San Andrés	38	16	7	15	47	38	+9	39	
9	Sevilla FC	38	15	9	14	48	40	+8	39	
10	Baracaldo CF	38	14	11	13	49	52	−3	39	
11	RCD Mallorca	38	12	15	11	36	32	+4	39	
12	CD Orense	38	13	12	13	43	45	−2	38	
13	Córdoba CF	38	16	6	16	58	58	0	38	Relegation playoff
14	Rayo Vallecano	38	14	5	19	39	51	−12	33	Relegation playoff
15	CD Sabadell	38	11	11	16	35	52	−17	33	Relegation playoff
16	Burgos CF	38	13	6	19	34	44	−10	32	Relegation playoff
17	CA Osasuna	38	10	8	20	36	63	−27	28	Relegated to Tercera División
18	Deportivo de La Coruña	38	11	6	21	30	56	−26	28	Relegated to Tercera División
19	Levante UD	38	10	7	21	37	48	−11	27	Relegated to Tercera División
20	Linares CF	38	8	9	21	29	59	−30	25	Relegated to Tercera División

Source: BDFutbol

== Results ==
Home \ Away	BAC	BET	BUR	CÁD	CÓR	DEP	GIM	HÉR	LEV	LIN	MLL	ORE	OSA	RAY	SAB	SAL	SAN	SEV	TEN	VLD
Baracaldo	—	0–0	2–1	1–1	3–2	2–0	2–1	0–0	3–1	4–1	0–0	2–1	3–1	1–0	2–0	1–0	4–0	1–0	5–1	1–1
Betis	3–0	—	3–0	2–2	5–1	4–0	3–0	2–1	1–1	2–0	1–1	3–0	5–0	5–1	3–2	0–0	1–1	3–0	1–1	2–0
Burgos	1–1	1–1	—	2–0	1–0	4–0	1–0	1–2	2–0	4–1	0–0	2–1	1–0	2–1	0–1	0–1	1–0	1–0	1–0	2–1
Cádiz	4–0	1–0	2–0	—	3–2	3–1	1–0	1–0	1–0	3–1	2–1	0–1	3–1	1–1	3–0	1–1	0–0	3–0	3–1	2–0
Córdoba	2–1	1–1	4–2	0–2	—	2–0	1–0	3–1	2–0	2–2	1–0	3–3	2–2	3–1	4–2	4–0	1–0	1–0	2–1	4–1
Deportivo	1–0	0–1	2–0	3–1	0–0	—	0–1	1–1	1–0	3–0	0–2	3–1	1–1	1–0	0–0	4–2	3–2	0–0	0–2	2–1
Gimnástico Tarragona	2–1	2–0	2–0	0–0	2–1	2–0	—	0–0	2–1	2–1	1–1	1–1	2–0	3–2	2–0	1–1	1–0	4–1	3–1	1–0
Hércules	3–1	1–0	0–0	3–0	2–0	2–0	2–1	—	1–0	2–3	1–1	1–0	2–0	1–0	2–0	3–1	2–0	1–1	3–1	3–1
Levante	4–2	1–2	1–0	0–1	2–1	4–1	2–0	0–1	—	1–0	2–2	2–1	0–1	2–1	1–0	1–1	1–1	1–1	1–1	1–3
Linares	0–0	0–1	0–0	1–1	1–0	0–0	0–3	2–0	1–0	—	2–1	1–1	3–0	0–1	2–0	0–1	1–1	0–5	0–1	0–0
Mallorca	1–1	1–1	1–0	1–1	0–1	2–1	2–0	3–1	0–0	1–0	—	2–0	3–0	1–0	2–2	0–1	1–0	1–1	1–0	0–0
Orense	3–2	0–0	1–0	0–0	2–1	2–0	1–0	0–1	1–0	1–2	1–1	—	2–0	0–0	0–0	3–1	2–0	1–0	1–1	1–0
Osasuna	1–1	3–3	2–1	0–0	2–1	1–0	3–0	1–2	2–1	3–0	0–3	2–1	—	0–1	1–1	2–1	0–1	0–2	2–2	1–1
Rayo Vallecano	0–0	2–3	2–0	1–0	2–3	2–0	1–1	1–0	0–4	3–0	2–0	2–2	2–1	—	1–0	0–2	1–0	1–0	3–0	2–1
Sabadell	2–2	2–3	1–0	3–4	0–0	1–2	0–0	0–0	1–0	1–0	2–0	1–1	1–0	1–0	—	1–0	1–0	1–1	0–0	4–3
Salamanca	2–0	1–0	2–2	2–1	4–1	1–0	2–1	0–1	1–0	2–0	3–0	3–2	3–1	1–0	3–1	—	2–0	2–0	1–0	0–0
San Andrés	4–0	0–0	1–0	2–1	3–0	1–0	2–1	1–1	1–0	1–0	1–0	1–2	4–0	2–0	2–0	4–2	—	2–0	2–3	5–0
Sevilla	3–0	2–1	2–0	1–0	2–1	1–0	1–1	4–2	2–0	3–3	2–0	2–0	0–1	3–0	1–2	1–1	0–0	—	4–2	2–1
Tenerife	2–0	1–3	3–0	3–0	2–0	5–0	3–1	1–1	3–1	3–0	0–0	3–1	2–0	2–1	1–0	1–0	2–0	1–0	—	1–0
Valladolid	3–0	1–0	3–1	2–0	3–1	2–0	2–2	3–1	3–1	2–1	1–0	2–2	2–1	5–1	6–1	2–2	4–2	1–0	0–0	—

Source: BDFutbol
Legend: Blue = home team win; Yellow = draw; Red = away team win.

== Relegation playoff ==
Home Matches:
Burgos	2-0	SD Éibar
Córdoba CF	3-1	AD Almería
CD Mestalla	0-0	CD Sabadell
Rayo Vallecano	5-0	UP Langreo

Away Matches:
SD Éibar	2-1	Burgos	Agg:2-3
AD Almería	3-2	Córdoba CF	Agg:4-5
CD Sabadell	2-0	CD Mestalla	Agg:2-0
UP Langreo	1-0	Rayo Vallecano	Agg:1-5

== Pichichi Trophy ==
Goalscorers	Goal	Team
(Spain) Baena	22	Cádiz
(Spain) José María Lizarralde	22	Valladolid
(Paraguay) Bernardo Acosta	20	Sevilla
(Spain) Rivero	16	San Andrés
(Chile) Carlos Caszely	15	Levante
