= 1977–78 La Liga =

47th season of La Liga

Primera División
- Season: 1977–78
- Dates: 3 September 1977 – 7 May 1978
- Champions: Real Madrid (18th title)
- Relegated: Real Betis; Elche; Cádiz
- European Cup: Real Madrid
- UEFA Cup Winners' Cup: Barcelona
- UEFA Cup: Athletic Bilbao; Valencia; Sporting Gijón
- Matches: 306
- Goals: 843 (2.75 per match)
- Top goalscorer: Mario Kempes (28 goals)

The 1977–78 La Liga was the 47th season since its establishment. It began on 3 September 1977, and concluded on 7 May 1978.

== Team locations ==
Location of teams in La Liga 1977–78
Canary Islands

Team	Home city	Stadium
Athletic Bilbao	Bilbao	San Mamés
Atlético Madrid	Madrid	Vicente Calderón
Barcelona	Barcelona	Nou Camp
Burgos	Burgos	El Plantío
Cádiz	Cádiz	Ramón de Carranza
Elche	Elche	Altabix
Español	Barcelona	Sarriá
Hércules	Alicante	José Rico Pérez
Las Palmas	Las Palmas	Insular
Racing Santander	Santander	El Sardinero
Rayo Vallecano	Madrid	Vallecas
Real Betis	Seville	Benito Villamarín
Real Madrid	Madrid	Santiago Bernabéu
Real Sociedad	San Sebastián	Atocha
Salamanca	Villares de la Reina	Helmántico
Sevilla	Seville	Ramón Sánchez Pizjuán
Sporting Gijón	Gijón	El Molinón
Valencia	Valencia	Luis Casanova

== League table ==
Pos	Team	Pld	W	D	L	GF	GA	GD	Pts	Qualification or relegation
1	Real Madrid (C)	34	22	3	9	77	40	+37	47	Qualification for the European Cup first round
2	Barcelona	34	16	9	9	49	29	+20	41	Qualification for the Cup Winners' Cup first round (Note: Barcelona qualified to the Cup Winners' Cup as winners of the Copa del Rey.)
3	Athletic Bilbao	34	16	8	10	62	36	+26	40	Qualification for the UEFA Cup first round
4	Valencia	34	16	7	11	54	33	+21	39	Qualification for the UEFA Cup first round
5	Sporting Gijón	34	15	9	10	53	43	+10	39	Qualification for the UEFA Cup first round
6	Atlético Madrid	34	16	4	14	61	52	+9	36	
7	Las Palmas	34	12	11	11	43	41	+2	35	
8	Sevilla	34	13	8	13	38	45	−7	34	
9	Salamanca	34	14	6	14	37	40	−3	34	
10	Rayo Vallecano	34	12	9	13	50	59	−9	33	
11	Real Sociedad	34	12	9	13	52	46	+6	33	
12	Burgos	34	10	11	13	33	47	−14	31	
13	Racing Santander	34	11	9	14	29	45	−16	31	
14	Español	34	12	6	16	48	60	−12	30	
15	Hércules	34	10	10	14	32	40	−8	30	
16	Real Betis (R)	34	11	8	15	51	52	−1	30	Relegation to the Segunda División
17	Elche (R)	34	11	5	18	44	66	−22	27	Relegation to the Segunda División
18	Cádiz (R)	34	7	8	19	30	69	−39	22	Relegation to the Segunda División

Source: BDFútbol
Rules for classification: 1) Points; 2) Head-to-head results; 3) Goal difference; 4) Number of goals scored
(C) Champions; (R) Relegated

== Results table ==
Home \ Away	ATH	ATM	BAR	BET	BUR	CÁD	ELC	ESP	HÉR	LPA	RAC	RAY	RMA	RSO	SAL	SEV	SPG	VAL
Athletic Bilbao		1–0	0–0	0–0	1–1	6–1	4–1	4–0	2–1	2–1	3–0	6–0	2–0	1–0	3–1	2–1	1–0	4–1
Atlético Madrid	0–1		1–0	1–1	2–1	4–0	3–1	2–1	3–1	2–1	3–0	4–0	1–3	2–1	4–2	1–0	5–1	3–0
FC Barcelona	3–1	1–0		1–0	3–0	1–1	5–1	1–1	2–1	5–0	3–0	1–1	2–3	1–0	3–1	3–1	1–0	1–0
Betis	2–2	4–3	0–0		2–1	3–0	4–0	3–1	1–1	1–2	3–1	1–0	4–2	1–0	0–1	3–2	1–1	1–1
Burgos	2–2	2–2	1–1	1–0		2–1	1–0	3–2	0–0	2–1	0–0	2–1	3–2	3–2	0–2	1–0	0–0	2–0
Cádiz CF	2–1	2–1	0–2	0–5	4–0		0–0	2–4	0–0	3–2	0–0	2–1	1–0	2–0	0–1	0–0	1–1	1–2
Elche CF	2–1	4–4	1–3	2–1	1–0	1–1		2–0	2–0	2–0	3–1	3–0	3–1	1–2	2–1	1–2	1–2	0–2
RCD Español	2–1	1–3	1–1	2–0	4–1	4–2	3–1		2–1	0–1	0–1	2–1	1–4	2–0	2–1	2–1	2–1	2–2
Hércules CF	1–0	1–0	2–1	2–0	0–0	0–0	0–0	1–1		1–2	4–0	1–1	2–3	1–0	2–0	2–2	1–0	1–0
UD Las Palmas	2–2	3–0	0–0	3–2	0–0	2–1	4–1	4–2	0–1		3–0	1–1	1–2	1–1	0–0	2–0	2–2	1–0
Racing de Santander	1–0	2–0	0–0	1–1	1–1	3–0	2–0	4–0	1–0	1–0		2–1	1–0	2–2	0–3	1–1	1–0	2–2
Rayo Vallecano	3–2	2–0	2–1	4–2	0–0	6–1	0–1	1–1	2–1	1–1	1–0		3–2	1–0	3–3	4–1	3–1	3–0
Real Madrid	1–0	4–2	4–0	4–0	3–0	2–0	5–1	2–1	3–0	1–1	2–0	5–2		5–0	0–0	3–0	3–2	1–0
Real Sociedad	2–1	4–1	1–2	3–0	3–1	6–1	3–2	1–1	0–0	4–1	2–0	1–1	2–3		2–0	4–0	1–1	1–1
UD Salamanca	0–3	0–1	1–0	1–0	2–0	2–1	1–0	1–0	2–0	0–0	3–0	1–0	2–1	0–0		1–1	2–3	0–1
Sevilla FC	0–0	3–0	2–1	1–0	1–0	1–0	3–3	3–1	2–1	1–0	1–0	2–0	1–1	1–1	2–1		1–2	1–0
Sporting de Gijón	2–2	3–2	1–0	4–3	3–2	3–0	3–0	1–0	2–1	0–0	3–1	1–1	0–2	6–2	3–0	1–0		0–0
Valencia CF	3–1	1–1	1–0	4–2	1–0	3–0	4–1	3–0	6–1	0–1	0–0	7–0	2–0	0–1	3–1	3–0	1–0	

Legend: Blue = home team win; Yellow = draw; Red = away team win.

== Pichichi Trophy ==
Rank	Player	Club	Goals
1	(Argentina) Mario Kempes	Valencia	28
2	(Spain) Santillana	Real Madrid	24
3	(Spain) Rubén Cano	Atlético Madrid	21
4	(Spain) Dani	Athletic Bilbao	20
5	(Spain) Marañón	Español	18
5	(Argentina) Carlos Morete	Las Palmas	18
5	(Spain) Jesús María Satrústegui	Real Sociedad	18
8	(Spain) Carlos	Athletic Bilbao	16
8	(Argentina) Héctor Scotta	Sevilla	16
