= 1976–77 Copa del Rey =

75th Copa del Rey

Tournament details
- Country: Spain
- Teams: 113

Final positions
- Champions: Real Betis (1st title)
- Runners-up: Athletic Bilbao

Tournament statistics
- Matches played: 223

The 1976–77 Copa del Rey was the 75th staging of the Spanish Cup. The competition began on 22 September 1976 and concluded on 25 June 1977 with the final.

== First round ==
| Team 1 | Agg. | Team 2 | 1st leg | 2nd leg |
|---|---|---|---|---|
| Atlético Baleares | 0–2 | Levante | 0–1 | 0–1 |
| Valdepeñas | 5–7 | Barcelona Atlètic | 3–3 | 2–4 |
| Moscardó | 2–10 | Terrassa | 0–4 | 2–6 |
| Pegaso | 1–1 (4–2 p) | Sevilla Atlético | 0–0 | 1–1 |
| Getafe | 4–3 | Gran Peña | 3–2 | 1–1 |
| Baskonia | 1–3 | Elche | 1–0 | 0–3 |
| Constancia | 0–1 | Hércules | 0–0 | 0–1 |
| Guadalajara | 2–4 | Deportivo de La Coruña | 0–1 | 2–3 |
| Vinaroz | 3–3 (1–3 p) | Calvo Sotelo | 2–1 | 1–2 |
| Las Palmas | 2–1 | Bilbao Athletic | 1–0 | 1–1 |
| Arenas Getxo | 0–9 | Deportivo Alavés | 0–6 | 0–3 |
| San Fernando | 1–5 | Sporting Gijón | 1–1 | 0–4 |
| Celta | 2–0 | Real Unión | 2–0 | 0–0 |
| Cultural Leonesa | 2–6 | Rayo Vallecano | 2–3 | 0–3 |
| Castellón | 7–2 | Carabanchel | 5–0 | 2–2 |
| Caudal | 1–4 | Pontevedra | 1–0 | 0–4 |
| Jerez | 2–3 | Valladolid | 1–2 | 1–1 |
| Salamanca | 4–2 | Poblense | 3–1 | 1–1 |
| Zamora | 3–10 | Real Sociedad | 2–4 | 1–6 |
| Córdoba | 3–2 | Racing Ferrol | 3–0 | 0–2 |
| Real Murcia | 3–1 | Jaén | 3–1 | 0–0 |
| Ponferradina | 3–11 | Recreativo de Huelva | 2–5 | 1–6 |
| San Andrés | 2–2 (4–5 p) | Lérida | 2–0 | 0–2 |
| Valencia | 6–1 | Naval | 6–0 | 0–1 |
| Burgos CF | 3–0 | Acero | 3–0 | 0–0 |
| Tenerife | 1–5 | Osasuna | 1–2 | 0–3 |
| Linares | 4–4 (4–2 p) | Racing de Santander | 2–2 | 2–2 |
| Baracaldo | 2–5 | Real Betis | 1–0 | 1–5 |
| Oviedo | 5–2 | Palencia | 4–1 | 1–1 |
| Granada | 2–2 (5–3 p) | Ensidesa | 0–0 | 2–2 |
| CD Gijón | 2–3 | Castilla | 2–0 | 0–3 |
| Olímpico de Játiva | 0–6 | Zaragoza | 0–5 | 0–1 |
| Eldense | 3–3 (3–4 p) | Málaga | 2–0 | 1–3 |
| Sevilla | 6–2 | CD Touring | 6–0 | 0–2 |
| Guernica | 2–1 | Laredo | 1–1 | 1–0 |
| Onteniente | 1–3 | Reus | 0–0 | 1–3 |
| Sabadell | 2–3 | Gimnástico de Tarragona | 2–0 | 0–3 |
| Gandía | 2–2 (4–5 p) | CD Guecho | 1–0 | 1–2 |
| Mérida | 2–5 | Ceuta | 1–4 | 1–1 |
| Díter Zafra | 1–2 | Xerez | 0–0 | 1–2 |
| Sestao | 5–2 | Langreo | 3–1 | 2–1 |
| Cacereño | 2–4 | Calahorra | 1–2 | 1–2 |
| Portuense | 1–2 | Algeciras | 1–1 | 0–1 |
| Badajoz | 2–5 | Almería | 2–2 | 0–3 |
| Gimnástica Torrelavega | 3–4 | Mallorca | 1–1 | 2–3 |
| CD Villena | 2–3 | Orense | 2–0 | 0–3 |
| Ibiza | 1–3 | Compostela | 1–0 | 0–3 |
| Logroñés | 3–5 | Gerona | 3–3 | 0–2 |
| Deportivo Aragón | 2–3 | Lugo | 1–1 | 1–2 |
| Melilla | 4–5 | Talavera | 3–2 | 1–3 |
| Mirandés | 2–0 | Torrejón | 1–0 | 1–0 |
| Orihuela Deportiva | 2–5 | Cádiz | 2–1 | 0–4 |
| Betis Deportivo | 3–4 | Huesca | 2–2 | 1–2 |
| Yeclano | 3–4 | Tudelano | 3–1 | 0–3 |

- Bye: Español, Real Madrid, Athletic Bilbao, FC Barcelona and Atlético Madrid.

== Second round ==
| Team 1 | Agg. | Team 2 | 1st leg | 2nd leg |
|---|---|---|---|---|
| Ceuta | 3–0 | Barcelona Atlético | 2–0 | 1–0 |
| Pegaso | 2–3 | Getafe | 1–0 | 1–3 |
| Mirandés | 2–3 | Elche | 2–0 | 0–3 |
| Gernica | 2–7 | Rayo Vallecano | 2–1 | 0–6 |
| Real Betis | 7–2 | Sestao | 5–1 | 2–1 |
| Huesca | 3–6 | Sporting Gijón | 1–1 | 2–5 |
| Hércules | 4–1 | Talavera | 4–1 | 0–0 |
| Lugo | 0–1 | Deportivo de La Coruña | 0–1 | 0–0 |
| Burgos CF | 2–2 (3–4 p) | Lérida | 1–1 | 1–1 |
| Algeciras | 1–2 | Cádiz | 0–0 | 1–2 |
| Orense | 2–5 | Salamanca | 1–3 | 1–2 |
| Terrassa | 0–1 | Sevilla | 0–0 | 0–1 |
| Castellón | 0–2 | Calahorra | 0–0 | 0–2 |
| Gerona | 1–0 | Levante | 0–0 | 1–0 |
| Granada | 5–3 | Castilla | 4–1 | 1–2 |
| Guecho | 0–2 | Alavés | 0–1 | 0–1 |
| Osasuna | 1–7 | Valladolid | 1–5 | 0–2 |
| Reus | | Celta | 1–3 | (Note: Reus abandoned the second leg match) |
| Málaga | 3–1 | Linares | 3–0 | 0–1 |
| Mallorca | 2–4 | Real Sociedad | 2–1 | 0–3 |
| Valencia | 5–1 | Oviedo | 3–0 | 2–1 |
| Recreativo de Huelva | 5–0 | Compostela | 5–0 | 0–0 |
| Zaragoza | 3–0 | Gimnástico de Tarragona | 1–0 | 2–0 |
| Almería | 3–6 | Pontevedra | 2–3 | 1–3 |
| Las Palmas | 3–2 | Real Murcia | 1–1 | 2–1 |
| Xerez | 0–1 | Córdoba | 0–0 | 0–1 |
| Tudelano | 1–2 | Calvo Sotelo | 1–0 | 0–2 |

- Bye: Español, Real Madrid, Athletic Bilbao, FC Barcelona and Atlético Madrid.

== Third round ==
| Team 1 | Agg. | Team 2 | 1st leg | 2nd leg |
|---|---|---|---|---|
| Alavés | 0–2 | Real Sociedad | 0–1 | 0–1 |
| Cádiz | 2–4 | Las Palmas | 2–1 | 0–3 |
| Celta | 2–0 | Getafe | 2–0 | 0–0 |
| Deportivo de La Coruña | 1–6 | Real Betis | 1–2 | 0–4 |
| Ceuta | 2–2 (3–4 p) | Salamanca | 1–0 | 1–2 |
| Córdoba | 1–0 | Calvo Sotelo | 0–0 | 1–0 |
| Gerona | 1–2 | Elche | 0–0 | 1–2 |
| Sporting Gijón | 2–3 | Español | 0–0 | 2–3 |
| Hércules | 3–2 | Real Madrid | 3–0 | 0–2 |
| Recreativo de Huelva | 4–2 | Calahorra | 3–0 | 1–2 |
| Lérida | 2–3 | Granada | 2–0 | 0–3 |
| Rayo Vallecano | 1–3 | Valladolid | 1–2 | 0–1 |
| Sevilla | 1–1 (5–4 p) | Pontevedra | 0–0 | 1–1 |
| Valencia | 3–0 | Málaga | 3–0 | 0–0 |

Source: RSSSF

- Bye: Zaragoza, Athletic Bilbao, FC Barcelona and Atlético Madrid.

== Fourth round ==
- Bye: all teams except Córdoba, Celta, Zaragoza and Granada.

| Team 1 | Agg. | Team 2 | 1st leg | 2nd leg |
|---|---|---|---|---|
| Córdoba | 1–3 | Celta | 1–0 | 0–3 |
| Zaragoza | 2–1 | Granada | 1–0 | 1–1 |

Source: RSSSF

== Round of 16 ==
| Team 1 | Agg. | Team 2 | 1st leg | 2nd leg |
|---|---|---|---|---|
| Celta | 3–2 | FC Barcelona | 1–1 | 2–1 |
| Elche | 1–4 | Athletic Bilbao | 1–0 | 0–4 |
| Recreativo | 0–2 | Salamanca | 0–1 | 0–1 |
| Real Sociedad | 2–5 | Español | 2–2 | 0–3 |
| Sevilla | 2–1 | Atlético Madrid | 2–0 | 0–1 |
| Valencia | 1–2 | Hércules | 1–0 | 0–2 |
| Valladolid | 2–3 | Real Betis | 1–2 | 1–1 |
| Zaragoza | 2–1 | Las Palmas | 1–0 | 1–1 |

Source: RSSSF

== Quarter-finals ==
| Team 1 | Agg. | Team 2 | 1st leg | 2nd leg |
|---|---|---|---|---|
| Athletic Bilbao | 6–3 | Sevilla | 5–0 | 1–3 |
| Real Betis | 3–3 (4–2 p) | Hércules | 2–1 | 1–2 |
| Español | 3–1 | Celta | 3–0 | 0–1 |
| Zaragoza | 2–3 | Salamanca | 1–0 | 1–3 |

Source: RSSSF

== Semi-finals ==
| Team 1 | Agg. | Team 2 | 1st leg | 2nd leg |
|---|---|---|---|---|
| Athletic Bilbao | 8–1 | Salamanca | 6–0 | 2–1 |
| Espanyol | 1–2 | Real Betis | 1–0 | 0–2 |

Source: RSSSF

== Final ==
| Team 1 | Score | Team 2 |
|---|---|---|
| Real Betis | 2–2 (8–7 p) | Athletic Bilbao |

Copa del Rey
winners
Real Betis
1st title
