= 2008–09 Real Betis season =

Real Betis
2008–09 season
- Owner: Manuel Ruiz de Lopera
- President: Pepe León
- Head coach: Paco Chaparro (until 6 April); José María Nogués (from 6 April)
- Stadium: Manuel Ruiz de Lopera
- La Liga: 18th (relegated)
- Copa del Rey: Quarter-finals
- Top goalscorer: League: Achille Emaná (11); All: Achille Emaná (12)
Home colours	Away colours	Third colours

The 2008–09 season was the 101st season of Real Betis and the club's eighth consecutive season in the top flight of Spanish football. In addition to the La Liga, Real Betis participated in this season's edition of the Copa del Rey.

== Players ==
=== First-team squad ===
Note: Flags indicate national team as defined under FIFA eligibility rules; some limited exceptions apply. Players may hold more than one non-FIFA nationality.

No.	Pos.	Nation	Player
1	GK	POR	Ricardo
2	DF	ESP	Melli
3	DF	ESP	Fernando Vega
4	DF	ESP	Juanito (captain)
5	DF	ESP	David Rivas
6	DF	SVN	Branko Ilič
7	MF	ESP	Juanma
8	MF	ESP	Arzu
9	FW	ESP	Sergio García
10	FW	BRA	Edú
11	MF	CHI	Mark González
12	DF	ESP	Damià Abella
13	GK	ESP	Casto

No.	Pos.	Nation	Player
14	MF	ESP	Capi
15	DF	ARG	Fabián Monzón
16	FW	ARG	Mariano Pavone
17	FW	BRA	Ricardo Oliveira
18	MF	ESP	Alberto Rivera
19	FW	ESP	Xisco
20	MF	CMR	Achille Emana
21	MF	TUR	Mehmet Aurélio **
22	DF	BRA	Willian Lima
23	DF	POR	Nélson
25	MF	GER	David Odonkor
27	MF	ESP	Juande
30	FW	ESP	Diego Segura

* Also holds (Brazil) Brazilian citizenship.

=== Loaned players ===
Note: Flags indicate national team as defined under FIFA eligibility rules; some limited exceptions apply. Players may hold more than one non-FIFA nationality.

No.	Pos.	Nation	Player
—	MF	ARG	Juan Pablo Caffa (at Real Zaragoza till July 1, 2009)
—	DF	ESP	Nano (at Real Valladolid till July 1, 2009)

== Pre-season and friendlies ==
Win Draw Loss

== Competitions ==
=== Overall record ===
Competition	First match	Last match	Starting round	Final position	Record							
Competition	First match	Last match	Starting round	Final position	Pld	W	D	L	GF	GA	GD	Win %
La Liga	31 August 2008	31 May 2009	Matchday 1	18th	38	10	12	16	51	58	−7	26.32
Copa del Rey	29 October 2008	28 January 2009	First round	Quarter-finals	6	4	1	1	6	1	+5	66.67
Total					44	14	13	17	57	59	−2	31.82

Source: Competitions

=== La Liga ===
==== League table ====
Pos	Team	Pld	W	D	L	GF	GA	GD	Pts	Qualification or relegation
16	Valladolid	38	12	7	19	46	58	−12	43 (Note: SPG: 12 pts; OSA: 2 pts → OSA 3–3 VLD; VLD: 2 pts → VLD 0–0 OSA)	
17	Getafe	38	10	12	16	50	56	−6	42 (Note: GET 0–0 BET; BET 2–2 GET)	
18	Real Betis (R)	38	10	12	16	51	58	−7	42	Relegation to the Segunda División
19	Numancia (R)	38	10	5	23	38	69	−31	35	Relegation to the Segunda División
20	Recreativo Huelva (R)	38	8	9	21	34	57	−23	33	Relegation to the Segunda División

Source: LFP and Yahoo! Sport
Rules for classification: 1) points; 2) head-to-head points; 3) head-to-head goal difference; 4) head-to-head goals scored; 5) goal difference; 6) number of goals scored.
(R) Relegated

==== Results summary ====
Overall								Home						Away					
Pld	W	D	L	GF	GA	GD	Pts	W	D	L	GF	GA	GD	W	D	L	GF	GA	GD
38	10	12	16	51	58	−7	42	4	8	7	24	25	−1	6	4	9	27	33	−6

Source: La Liga

==== Results by round ====
Round	1	2	3	4	5	6	7	8	9	10	11	12	13	14	15	16	17	18	19	20	21	22	23	24	25	26	27	28	29	30	31	32	33	34	35	36	37	38
Ground	H	A	H	A	H	A	H	A	H	A	H	A	A	H	A	H	A	H	A	A	H	A	H	A	H	A	H	A	H	A	H	H	A	H	A	H	A	H
Result	L	D	D	L	L	L	W	W	L	W	W	W	L	D	L	L	L	L	W	L	D	W	D	L	D	D	D	D	D	W	W	L	L	L	L	W	D	D
Position																																						

Source: La Liga
A = Away; H = Home; W = Win; D = Draw; L = Loss

==== Matches ====
The league fixtures were announced on July 16, 2008.

31 August 2008 1	Real Betis	0–1	Recreativo	Seville
				Stadium: Manuel Ruiz de Lopera

14 September 2008 2	Getafe	0–0	Real Betis	Getafe
				Stadium: Coliseum Alfonso Pérez

21 September 2008 3	Real Betis	0–0	Sevilla	Seville
				Stadium: Manuel Ruiz de Lopera

24 September 2008 4	Barcelona	3–2	Real Betis	Barcelona
				Stadium: Camp Nou

27 September 2008 5	Real Betis	1–2	Real Madrid	Seville
				Stadium: Manuel Ruiz de Lopera

4 October 2008 6	Villarreal	2–1	Real Betis	Villarreal
				Stadium: El Madrigal

19 October 2008 7	Real Betis	3–0	Mallorca	Seville
				Stadium: Manuel Ruiz de Lopera

25 October 2008 8	Osasuna	0–2	Real Betis	Pamplona
				Stadium: El Sadar

2 November 2008 9	Real Betis	0–3	Deportivo La Coruña	Seville
				Stadium: Manuel Ruiz de Lopera

9 November 2008 10	Numancia	2–4	Real Betis	Soria
				Stadium: Nuevo Estadio Los Pajaritos

16 November 2008 11	Real Betis	3–1	Racing Santander	Seville
				Stadium: Manuel Ruiz de Lopera

23 November 2008 12	Sporting Gijón	1–2	Real Betis	Gijón
				Stadium: El Molinón

30 November 2008 13	Valencia	3–2	Real Betis	Valencia
				Stadium: Mestalla

7 December 2008 14	Real Betis	1–1	Espanyol	Seville
				Stadium: Manuel Ruiz de Lopera

14 December 2008 15	Atlético Madrid	2–0	Real Betis	Madrid
				Stadium: Vicente Calderón

21 December 2008 16	Real Betis	0–1	Athletic Bilbao	Seville
				Stadium: Manuel Ruiz de Lopera

4 January 2009 17	Almería	1–0	Real Betis	Almería
				Stadium: Estadio de los Juegos Mediterráneos

11 January 2009 18	Real Betis	1–2	Málaga	Seville
				Stadium: Manuel Ruiz de Lopera

18 January 2009 19	Valladolid	1–3	Real Betis	Valladolid
				Stadium: Estadio José Zorrilla

25 January 2009 20	Recreativo	1–0	Real Betis	Huelva
				Stadium: Estadio Nuevo Colombino

1 February 2009 21	Real Betis	2–2	Getafe	Seville
				Stadium: Manuel Ruiz de Lopera

7 February 2009 22	Sevilla	1–2	Real Betis	Seville
				Stadium: Ramón Sánchez Pizjuán

14 February 2009 23	Real Betis	2–2	Barcelona	Seville
				Stadium: Manuel Ruiz de Lopera

21 February 2009 24	Real Madrid	6–1	Real Betis	Madrid
				Stadium: Santiago Bernabéu

1 March 2009 25	Real Betis	2–2	Villarreal	Seville
				Stadium: Manuel Ruiz de Lopera

8 March 2009 26	Mallorca	3–3	Real Betis	Palma
				Stadium: ONO Estadi

15 March 2009 27	Real Betis	0–0	Osasuna	Seville
				Stadium: Manuel Ruiz de Lopera

22 March 2009 28	Deportivo La Coruña	1–1	Real Betis	A Coruña
17:00				Stadium: Riazor; Attendance: 28,000; Referee: Miguel Ángel Ayza Gámez

4 April 2009 29	Real Betis	3–3	Numancia	Seville
				Stadium: Manuel Ruiz de Lopera

12 April 2009 30	Racing Santander	2–3	Real Betis	Santander
				Stadium: El Sardinero

19 April 2009 31	Real Betis	2–0	Sporting Gijón	Seville
				Stadium: Manuel Ruiz de Lopera

22 April 2009 32	Real Betis	1–2	Valencia	Seville
				Stadium: Manuel Ruiz de Lopera

26 April 2009 33	Espanyol	2–0	Real Betis	Barcelona
				Stadium: Estadi Olímpic Lluís Companys

3 May 2009 34	Real Betis	0–2	Atlético Madrid	Seville
				Stadium: Manuel Ruiz de Lopera

9 May 2009 35	Athletic Bilbao	1–0	Real Betis	Bilbao
				Stadium: San Mamés

17 May 2009 36	Real Betis	2–0	Almería	Seville
				Stadium: Manuel Ruiz de Lopera

23 May 2009 37	Málaga	1–1	Real Betis	Málaga
				Stadium: La Rosaleda

31 May 2009 38	Real Betis	1–1	Valladolid	Seville
				Stadium: Manuel Ruiz de Lopera

=== Copa del Rey ===
==== Round of 32 ====
29 October 2008 First leg	Castellón	0–2	Real Betis	Castellón de la Plana
20:00				Stadium: Nou Estadi Castàlia; Attendance: 4,888; Referee: Rubinos Perez

12 November 2008 Second leg	Real Betis	2–0 (4–0 agg.)	Castellón	Seville
21:00				Stadium: Manuel Ruiz de Lopera; Attendance: 10,000; Referee: Julian Rodriguez Santiago

==== Round of 16 ====
7 January 2009 First leg	Real Unión	0–1	Real Betis	Irun
21:00				Stadium: Stadium Gal; Attendance: 3,000; Referee: Alberto Undiano Mallenco

14 January 2009 Second leg	Real Betis	1–0 (2–0 agg.)	Real Unión	Seville
20:00				Stadium: Manuel Ruiz de Lopera; Attendance: 20,000; Referee: Carlos Velasco Carballo

==== Quarter-finals ====
22 January 2009 First leg	Mallorca	1–0	Real Betis	Palma
21:00				Stadium: ONO Estadi; Attendance: 10,000; Referee: Álvarez Izquierdo

28 January 2009 Second leg	Real Betis	0–0 (0–1 agg.)	Mallorca	Seville
21:00				Stadium: Manuel Ruiz de Lopera; Attendance: 25,000; Referee: Pérez Lasa
