= Irish-Scots =

Irish-Scots or Hiberno-Scots may refer to:

- Ulster Scots people
  - Scotch-Irish Americans
  - Scotch-Irish Canadians
- Ulster Scots dialect
- Irish Scottish people

== See also ==
- Ulster Scots (disambiguation)
- Scots (disambiguation)
- Scott's (disambiguation)
- Scottish (disambiguation)
- Scotts (disambiguation)
- Scotch-Irish (disambiguation)
