= Manuel Ramos Asencio =

Spanish footballer (1892–1954)

Personal information
- Date of birth: 11 January 1892
- Place of birth: Isla Cristina, Andalusia, Spain
- Date of death: 25 December 1954 (aged 62)
- Place of death: Cazalla de la Sierra, Spain

Senior career*
Years	Team	Apps	(Gls)
1907–1918	Real Betis		

Managerial career
- 1911–1914: Real Betis
- 1914–1915: Real Betis
- * Club domestic league appearances and goals

Manuel Ramos Asencio (11 January 1892 – 25 December 1954) was a Spanish footballer who is widely regarded as one of the most important figures in the amateur beginnings of Real Betis, being one of its founders in 1907, and then serving the club as its first-ever captain and manager in the early 1910s. However, he is best remembered for his key role in bringing the famous green and white colours to Betis.

== Early life and education ==
Born on 11 January 1892 in Isla Cristina, Andalusia, Ramos Asencio was sent to Scotland at the age of 12, to complete his studies at the Catholic St Joseph's College, Dumfries, which had been founded in 1875 by Brother Walfrid, who years later, in 1887, also founded Celtic in Glasgow. During his stay in Britain, Ramos Asencio developed a deep interest in football, often travelling to Glasgow to attended Celtic's matches, making several close friends at the club in the process.

== Sporting career ==
Upon his return to Seville in 1907, the 15-year-old Ramos Asencio helped to create Sevilla Balompié, which later became Real Betis; this was only the second football team in the city after Sevilla FC. He was the club's first-ever captain, playing with Betis for over a decade, until the 1917–18 season. Furthermore, he also used his knowledge of the English language to set up and organize matches between Betis and the crews of the Scottish ships, who docked in the port of Seville every month from the likes of Ayr, Ardrossan, and Kirkcaldy to unload coal and load iron ore.

After three years, the Betis uniforms, which consisted of blue shirts and white short, had grown worn out from so much sweat and washing, so Ramos Asencio arranged for the green and white jerseys of the Irish-Scots club Celtic to arrive from Scotland, which Betis wore for the first time in November 1910, in a friendly match against Betis FC to kick-off the 1910–11 season. To distinguish them, Real Betis wore the green and white as vertical stripes, just as Celtic had originally done, though a few years earlier the Glasgow club had switched to wearing horizontal hoops instead. The First World War broke off the maritime trade between Spain and Scotland, so Betis briefly returned to the original blue jerseys in 1916, but then resumed the green ones in 1919, after the War had ended.

At the time, the figure of the coach as we know it today did not yet exist, so it was the duty of the captain to dictate the tactics to be followed and making up the line-ups for the matches, hence why Ramos Asencio soon began acting as the team's coach, a position that he held for three years, from 1911 until 1914, when he was replaced by Herbert Richard Jones, who had just been named the club's president. When Jones made his debut for Betis in November 1912, Ramos Asencio already was the club's captain and coach.

Under his leadership, Sevilla Balompié won the Copa Seville in 1911 and 1914, then the most important competition contested by Seville clubs, with the winning team claiming a trophy donated by the Seville City Council. In the 1914 final, which took place on 15 February at Balompié's stadium in the Prado de San Sebastián, Ramos Asencio's men drew 1–1 with Sevilla, so the final had to be replayed two weeks later, on 1 March, this time at Sevilla's ground, where Balompié won the title with a 2–1 victory in front of more than 3,000 spectators. However, Balompié was not awarded the trophy by Sevilla, who cited the "dirty play" from Balompié's Carmelo Navarro, which sparked a heated debate between the presidents of both clubs in the Seville press; Ramos Asencio, as the captain, also decided to intervene, writing a latter that was published four days after the match, in which he expressed his indignation at the behavior of his opponents, stating that he was the first to caution Navarro for his "dirty play" during some matches, and that "for my part, the referees of the 24 matches in which I have taken part for Balompié can say that I have never committed a foul, and I also know that the rest of the players have been no less clean than I".

== Later life and death ==
Ramos Asencio later moved to Cazalla de la Sierra, where he quickly became one of the driving forces of football in the city, helping to build the first football field in the city in 1917, and then helped establish the city's first club, Cazalla Sporting, in 1921, whose colours are also green and white.

Ramos Asencio died in Cazalla de la Sierra on 11 September 1948, at the age of 62.

== Legacy ==
On 16 September 2021, on the occasion of a UEFA Europa League group stage match between Betis and Celtic, the club paid a tribute to Ramos Asencio for having been the one to bring the green and white shirts from Glasgow; his son Ángel Ramos, then 92, watched the match from the presidential box. In recognition of his crucial role in promoting football in Cazalla de la Sierra, the city decided to make a commemorative plaque in his honor, which was unveiled before a CDF Cazalla match in March 2022, during a ceremony that was attended by his son Ángel. A few months later, in November 2022, the fan of Betis made a tifo depicting Ramos Asencio.

== Honours ==
Real Betis

- Copa Seville: 1911, 1914
