= Scots Parliament =

Scots Parliament can refer to:

- Parliament of Scotland, the pre-1707 legislature of the Kingdom of Scotland
- Scottish Parliament, the post-1999 unicameral devolved legislature of Scotland

== See also ==
- Scots (disambiguation)
