= Papá Jones =

English footballer and sports leader (1885–1950)

Personal information
- Full name: Herbert Richard Jones Vengouzel
- Date of birth: 8 September 1885
- Place of birth: Colombo, Sri Lanka
- Date of death: 20 September 1950 (aged 65)
- Place of death: Streatham, London, England
- Position: Midfielder

Senior career*
Years	Team	Apps	(Gls)
1908–1911	Cádiz SC		
1911–1912	Español de Cádiz		
1912–1914	Real Betis		

Managerial career
- 1914: Real Betis
- 1916: Real Betis
Last president of Sporting de Gijón
In office 14 September 1914 – December 1914
Preceded by	Juan del Castillo Ochoa
1st president of Real Betis
In office December 1914 – 1915
Succeeded by	Pedro Rodríguez de la Borbolla
- * Club domestic league appearances and goals

Herbert Richard Jones Vengouzel (8 September 1885 – 29 September 1950), also known as Papá Jones, was an English footballer who is widely regarded as one of the most important figures in the amateur beginnings of Real Betis, being one of its first managers and then serving as its first-ever president in 1914–15.

== Early life and education ==
Herbert Richard Jones was born into a British bourgeois family on 8 September 1885 in Colombo, Sri Lanka, then a British colony. By then, football had already taken a deep root in the British colonies, and soon it gained followers among the local youth, such as Herbert, who began playing this sport in the many hometown teams that had been founded.

== Sporting career ==
=== Cádiz ===
In 1905, the 20-year-old Jones was sent to Cádiz to work as a translator in a customs agency, eventually settling there, where he married Maria Teresa Medina, the daughter of a soldier in the San Fernando Navy. Upon his arrival there, he began promoting the sport of football throughout the city, playing a crucial role in the creation of the city's first teams in 1908, Cádiz Sporting Club, Cádiz Football Club, and Cádiz Balompié, and then participated in the first known football match in Cádiz, which was played between Cádiz FC and Cádiz SC in 1908.

During the amateur beginnings of football in Cádiz, it was common for players to constantly change sides, with Jones himself playing for all three aforementioned clubs before finally committing to the newly founded Español de Cádiz in 1911, which had a much more serious project of competing in regional competitions. Although he sometimes played between the posts, he was a midfielder, from where he commanded and organized the play; on one occasion, in a match against the sailors of the Dutch ship "Gardeland", the referee awarded a penalty to Cádiz who was already winning 10–0, so Jones shot it wide, which was applauded by the stands.

=== Real Betis ===
In late 1912, Jones, then the captain of Español de Cádiz, moved with his family to the neighboring Seville, where he joined the local team Sevilla Balompié, making his debut for the first team on 17 November 1912, in a friendly match against Betis FC, helping his side to a 3–0 win. Jones was one of only two non-Spanish members of the club, the other being the Scottish Alexander D. Millar, the nephew of Edward F. Johnston, a former president of Sevilla FC.

Due to his experience and knowledge of the game, he became the club's manager, earning the nickname Papá Jones, and under his leadership, Sevilla Balompié won the 1914 Copa Seville, then the most important competition contested by Seville clubs, with the winning team claiming a trophy donated by the Seville City Council. In the 1914 final, which took place on 1 March at Sevilla's ground, he scored a goal to help his side to a 2–1 victory over Sevilla in front of more than 3,000 spectators. However, Balompié was not awarded the trophy by Sevilla, who cited the "dirty play" from Balompié's Carmelo Navarro, which sparked a heated debate between the presidents of both clubs in the Seville press; Jones, as the captain, also decided to intervene, writing a letter that was published shortly after in El Liberal.

A few months later, both clubs changed their presidencies, with Paco Alba succeeding José Luis Gallegos in June, while in Betis, Papá Jones soon became even more popular than the president Juan del Castillo Ochoa, whom he replaced on 14 September 1914. He had a good relationship with Alba, so he played two friendlies for Sevilla on 31 October and 1 November 1914, both against Madrid FC in the capital. Around this time, Jones had the idea of merging both clubs, but the strong antagonism between them prevented its fruition. Shortly after, however, he began promoting the merger of his team, Balompié, with the newly-founded Betis FC, which resulted in the creation of Real Betis Balompié on 23 December 1914, thus becoming the club's first president. Four days later, on 27 December, he played in the club's first-ever match. He held the club's presidency for a few months, until mid-1915, when he was replaced by Pedro Rodríguez de la Borbolla.

=== Other activities ===
In addition to his work within Real Betis, he also worked as a referee; in January 1916, for instance, he refereed the quarter-finals of the Andalusian Championship between Español de Cádiz and Málaga, which ended in a victory for his former club, who went on to claim the title. In April 1917, he spent some time in Cadiz with his family, and in early 1918, he was elected the vice-secretary of the Southern Regional Federation.

== Later life and death ==
Jones remained in Seville until 1918, when his country called him up to enlist in the British army during the First World War. Some sources wrongly state that he died during the later stages of the conflict in 1918, somewhere in the Middle East, but in reality, Jones only died in Streatham, London, on 29 September 1950, at the age of 65.

== Legacy ==
In April 2018, Jones was the subject of a tribute by Betis during the halftime of a league match against Las Palmas, in which his grandchildren, María Luisa Stuchfield and Charles Stuchfield, received a number 1 shirt bearing the name "Papá Jones".

== Honours ==
Real Betis

- Copa Seville
  - Champions (1): 1914
