= Scotts =

Scotts or Scott's may refer to:

== Businesses and brands ==
- Scott's (restaurant), in London
- Scott's Food & Pharmacy, an American supermarket chain
- Scotts Miracle-Gro Company, an American multinational corporation
- Scott's Porage Oats, a Scottish breakfast cereal
- Scotts Shipbuilding and Engineering Company, a Scottish shipbuilding company 1711–1993

== Places ==
- Scotts, Michigan, U.S.
- Scotts, North Carolina, U.S.
- Scotts Valley, California, U.S.

== Other uses ==
- Scotts (band), a Swedish music group
- "The Scotts", a 2020 song by The Scotts (Travis Scott and Kid Cudi)

== See also ==
- Scots (disambiguation)
- Scotch (disambiguation)
- Scottish (disambiguation)
- Scotts Bluff National Monument, in Nebraska, U.S.
