= 2008–09 La Liga =

78th season of La Liga

La Liga
- Season: 2008–09
- Dates: 30 August 2008 – 31 May 2009
- Champions: Barcelona; 19th title
- Relegated: Real Betis; Numancia; Recreativo Huelva
- Champions League: Barcelona; Real Madrid; Sevilla; Atlético Madrid
- Europa League: Villarreal; Valencia; Athletic Bilbao (as Copa del Rey runners-up)
- Matches: 380
- Goals: 1,101 (2.9 per match)
- Top goalscorer: Diego Forlán (32 goals)
- Biggest home win: Real Madrid 7–1 Sporting Gijón (24 September 2008); Barcelona 6–0 Valladolid (8 November 2008); Barcelona 6–0 Málaga (22 March 2009)
- Biggest away win: Sporting Gijón 1–6 Barcelona (21 September 2008)
- Highest scoring: Real Madrid 7–1 Sporting Gijón (24 September 2008); Real Madrid 2–6 Barcelona (2 May 2009); Deportivo La Coruña 5–3 Racing Santander (8 March 2009); Villarreal 4–4 Atlético Madrid (26 October 2008)

The 2008–09 La Liga season (known as the Liga BBVA for sponsorship reasons) was the 78th since its establishment. Real Madrid were the defending champions, having won their 31st La Liga title in the previous season. The campaign began on 30 August 2008, and concluded on 31 May 2009. A total of 20 teams contested the league, 17 of which already contested in the 2007–08 season, and three of which were promoted from the Segunda División. A new match ball – the Nike T90 Omni – served as the official ball for all matches.

On 16 May 2009, following Villarreal's 3–2 victory over Real Madrid, Barcelona were declared champions, winning their 19th La Liga title, with three matches to play. Barcelona's Lionel Messi received the inaugural La Liga Award for Best Player from the Liga Nacional de Fútbol Profesional.

== Promotion and relegation ==
Real Zaragoza, Real Murcia and Levante were relegated to the 2008–09 Segunda División after finishing in the bottom three spots of the table at the end of the 2007–08 La Liga. Zaragoza were relegated to the Segunda División after five seasons of continuous membership in the top football league of Spain; Levante returned in Segunda División after two-year tenured in La Liga; and Murcia made their immediate return to the second level.

The three relegated teams were replaced by three 2007–08 Segunda División sides. Champions Numancia, who ended their second-level status after three years, runners-up Málaga, who returned to the top flight after two season in the second level, and Sporting de Gijón returned to the highest Spanish league after ten years.

== Team information ==
=== Stadia and locations ===
Location of teams in La Liga 2008–09

Team	Venue	Capacity
Almería	Estadio del Mediterráneo	22,000
Athletic Bilbao	San Mamés	39,750
Atlético Madrid	Vicente Calderón	54,851
Barcelona	Camp Nou	98,772
Betis	Manuel Ruiz de Lopera	52,132
Deportivo	Riazor	34,600
Espanyol	Estadi Olímpic Lluís Companys	55,926
Getafe	Coliseum Alfonso Pérez	16,300
Málaga	La Rosaleda	35,530
Mallorca	ONO Estadi	23,142
Numancia	Los Pajaritos	9,700
Osasuna	Estadio Reyno de Navarra	19,553
Racing Santander	El Sardinero	22,400
Real Madrid	Santiago Bernabéu	80,354
Recreativo	Nuevo Colombino	21,600
Sevilla	Ramón Sánchez Pizjuán	45,500
Sporting	El Molinón	25,885
Valencia	Mestalla	55,000
Valladolid	Estadio José Zorrilla	26,512
Villarreal	El Madrigal	23,000

=== Personnel and sponsoring ===
Team	Chairman	Head Coach	Kit manufacturer	Shirt sponsor (front)	Shirt sponsor (back)	Shirt sponsor (sleeve)	Shorts sponsor
Almería	Alfonso García	(Mexico) Hugo Sánchez	UDA	Obrascampo/isladelfraile.com/Corredor de Vida	Andalucía	None	None
Athletic Bilbao	Fernando García	(Spain) Joaquín Caparrós	100% Athletic	Petronor	None	None	None
Atlético Madrid	Enrique Cerezo	(Spain) Abel Resino	Nike	Kia	Kyocera	None	Paf
Barcelona	Joan Laporta	(Spain) Pep Guardiola	Nike	UNICEF	None	TV3	None
Betis	Pepe León	(Spain) José María Nogués	Kappa	Andalucía	None	None	None
Deportivo	Augusto Lendoiro	(Spain) Miguel Ángel Lotina	Canterbury of New Zealand	Estrella Galicia	None	None	None
Espanyol	Daniel Sánchez Llibre	(Argentina) Mauricio Pochettino	uhlsport	Interapuestas.com	Trina Solar	TV3	Abasol
Getafe	Ángel Torres	(Spain) Míchel	Joma	Grupo Galco	Thecam	SDS Seguridad	EADS CASA, Antonio y Ricardo
Málaga	Fernando Sanz	(Spain) Antonio Tapia	Umbro	Málaga Ciudad Genial	Andalucía	Tesesa	Instituto de Fertilidad Clínicas Rincón, Málaga Hoy
Mallorca	Mateu Alemany	(Spain) Gregorio Manzano	Reial	Illes Balears/Viajes Iberia	Construcciones Llabrés Feliu	IB3	Illes Balears
Numancia	Francisco Garcés	(Spain) Juan José Rojo Martín	Errea	Caja Duero	Areniscas Stone	CleanBird	Castilla y León es Vida
Osasuna	Patxi Izco	(Spain) José Antonio Camacho	Diadora	Yingli Solar	NGS Technology	Caja Navarra	Reyno de Navarra, NGS Technology
Racing Santander	Francisco Pernía	(Spain) López Muñiz	Joma	None	None	None	None
Real Madrid	Vicente Boluda	(Spain) Juande Ramos	Adidas	Bwin.com	None	None	None
Recreativo	Francisco Mendoza	(Spain) Lucas Alcaraz	Cejudo	Cajasol	Andalucía	Toyota Niponuba	Condado de Huelva, Fresón de Palos
Sevilla	José María del Nido	(Spain) Manolo Jiménez	Joma	888.com	Andalucía	NO8DO	None
Sporting	Manuel Vega-Arango	(Spain) Manolo Preciado	Astore	Gijón, Asturias	Vegasol	Asturias Paraíso Natural, Deporte Asturiano	Asturias Paraíso Natural, Deporte Asturiano
Valencia	Vicente Soriano	(Spain) Unai Emery	Nike	Valencia Experience, Unibet	Compac Encimeras	Canal Nou	None
Valladolid	Carlos Suárez Sureda	(Spain) José Luis Mendilibar	Puma	Caja Duero	Pepetravel.com	None	Del Cura y Miranda AXA, Castilla y León es Vida
Villarreal	Fernando Roig	(Chile) Manuel Pellegrini	Puma	Aeroport Castelló	None	Canal Nou	None

- Barcelona had no shirt sponsor during the 2008–09 season. Instead, following the signing of a five-year agreement with the humanitarian organisation UNICEF in 2006, the club sported the UNICEF logo on the front of its jersey while making an annual donation to the organisation.

=== Managerial changes ===
Team	Outgoing manager	Manner of departure	Date of vacancy	Replaced by	Date of appointment	Position in table
Recreativo	(Spain) Manolo Zambrano	Sacked	7 October 2008	(Spain) Lucas Alcaraz	7 October 2008	18th
Osasuna	(Spain) José Ángel Ziganda	Sacked	13 October 2008	(Spain) José Antonio Camacho	13 October 2008	16th
Espanyol	(Spain) Tintín Márquez	Sacked	30 November 2008	(Spain) José Manuel Esnal	1 December 2008	17th
Real Madrid	(Germany) Bernd Schuster	Sacked	9 December 2008	(Spain) Juande Ramos	9 December 2008	5th
Almería	(Spain) Gonzalo Arconada	Sacked	21 December 2008	(Mexico) Hugo Sánchez	22 December 2008	16th
Espanyol	(Spain) José Manuel Esnal	Sacked	20 January 2009	(Argentina) Mauricio Pochettino	20 January 2009	18th
Atlético Madrid	(Mexico) Javier Aguirre	Sacked	2 February 2009	(Spain) Abel Resino	2 February 2009	7th
Numancia	(Croatia) Sergije Krešić	Sacked	17 February 2009	(Spain) Pacheta	17 February 2009	19th
Betis	(Spain) Paco Chaparro	Sacked	6 April 2009	(Spain) José María Nogués	6 April 2009	16th
Getafe	(Spain) Víctor Muñoz	Sacked	27 April 2009	(Spain) Míchel	27 April 2009	17th

== League table ==
Pos	Team	Pld	W	D	L	GF	GA	GD	Pts	Qualification or relegation
1	Barcelona (C)	38	27	6	5	105	35	+70	87	Qualification for the Champions League group stage
2	Real Madrid	38	25	3	10	83	52	+31	78	Qualification for the Champions League group stage
3	Sevilla	38	21	7	10	54	39	+15	70	Qualification for the Champions League group stage
4	Atlético Madrid	38	20	7	11	80	57	+23	67	Qualification for the Champions League play-off round
5	Villarreal	38	18	11	9	61	54	+7	65	Qualification for the Europa League play-off round
6	Valencia	38	18	8	12	68	54	+14	62	Qualification for the Europa League play-off round
7	Deportivo La Coruña	38	16	10	12	48	47	+1	58	
8	Málaga	38	15	10	13	55	59	−4	55	
9	Mallorca	38	14	9	15	53	60	−7	51	
10	Espanyol	38	12	11	15	46	49	−3	47	
11	Almería	38	13	7	18	45	61	−16	46 (Note: ALM 1–1 RAC; RAC 0–2 ALM)	
12	Racing Santander	38	12	10	16	49	48	+1	46	
13	Athletic Bilbao	38	12	8	18	47	62	−15	44	Qualification for the Europa League third qualifying round (Note: Since Barcelona, winners of the 2008–09 Copa del Rey, already qualified for the 2009–10 UEFA Champions League, losing cup finalists Athletic Bilbao earned a spot in the third qualifying round of the 2009–10 UEFA Europa League.)
14	Sporting Gijón	38	14	1	23	47	79	−32	43 (Note: SPG: 12 pts; OSA: 2 pts → OSA 3–3 VLD; VLD: 2 pts → VLD 0–0 OSA)	
15	Osasuna	38	10	13	15	41	47	−6	43	
16	Valladolid	38	12	7	19	46	58	−12	43	
17	Getafe	38	10	12	16	50	56	−6	42 (Note: GET 0–0 BET; BET 2–2 GET)	
18	Real Betis (R)	38	10	12	16	51	58	−7	42	Relegation to the Segunda División
19	Numancia (R)	38	10	5	23	38	69	−31	35	Relegation to the Segunda División
20	Recreativo Huelva (R)	38	8	9	21	34	57	−23	33	Relegation to the Segunda División

Source: LFP and Yahoo! Sport
Rules for classification: 1) points; 2) head-to-head points; 3) head-to-head goal difference; 4) head-to-head goals scored; 5) goal difference; 6) number of goals scored.
(C) Champions; (R) Relegated
Notes:

La Liga 2008–09 winners

19th title

== Results ==
Home \ Away	ALM	ATH	ATM	FCB	BET	RCD	ESP	GET	MCF	MLL	NUM	OSA	RAC	RMA	REC	SFC	RSG	VCF	VLD	VIL
Almería		2–1	1–1	0–2	1–0	0–1	0–3	2–1	1–0	2–1	2–1	2–1	1–1	1–1	1–0	0–1	3–1	2–2	3–2	3–0
Athletic Bilbao	1–3		1–4	0–1	1–0	0–1	1–1	0–1	3–2	2–1	2–0	2–0	2–1	2–5	1–1	1–2	3–0	3–2	2–0	1–4
Atlético Madrid	3–0	2–3		4–3	2–0	4–1	3–2	1–1	4–0	2–0	3–0	2–4	4–1	1–2	4–0	0–1	3–1	1–0	1–2	3–2
Barcelona	5–0	2–0	6–1		3–2	5–0	1–2	1–1	6–0	3–1	4–1	0–1	1–1	2–0	2–0	4–0	3–1	4–0	6–0	3–3
Betis	2–0	0–1	0–2	2–2		0–3	1–1	2–2	1–2	3–0	3–3	0–0	3–1	1–2	0–1	0–0	2–0	1–2	1–1	2–2
Deportivo La Coruña	2–0	3–1	1–2	1–1	1–1		1–0	1–1	2–0	0–0	1–0	0–0	5–3	2–1	4–1	1–3	0–3	1–1	1–0	3–0
Espanyol	2–2	1–0	2–3	1–2	2–0	3–1		1–1	3–0	3–3	3–4	1–0	1–0	0–2	1–1	0–2	0–1	3–0	1–0	0–0
Getafe	2–2	1–1	1–2	0–1	0–0	1–2	1–1		1–2	4–1	1–0	3–0	0–1	3–1	2–1	0–2	5–1	0–3	1–0	1–2
Málaga	3–2	0–0	1–1	1–4	1–1	1–1	4–0	2–1		1–1	2–0	4–2	1–0	0–1	0–2	2–2	1–0	0–2	2–1	2–2
Mallorca	2–0	3–3	2–0	2–1	3–3	1–1	3–0	2–1	2–2		2–0	1–1	1–0	0–3	2–3	0–0	0–2	3–1	2–0	2–3
Numancia	2–1	1–2	1–1	1–0	2–4	0–1	0–0	2–0	2–0	0–1		0–0	2–1	0–2	1–0	0–2	2–1	2–1	4–3	1–2
Osasuna	3–1	2–1	0–0	2–3	0–2	0–0	1–0	5–2	2–3	1–0	2–0		0–1	2–1	1–2	0–0	1–2	1–0	3–3	1–1
Racing Santander	0–2	1–1	5–1	1–2	2–3	0–0	3–0	1–1	1–1	1–2	5–0	1–1		0–2	1–1	1–1	1–0	0–1	3–2	1–1
Real Madrid	3–0	3–2	1–1	2–6	6–1	1–0	2–2	3–2	4–3	1–3	4–3	3–1	1–0		1–0	3–4	7–1	1–0	2–0	1–0
Recreativo	1–1	1–1	0–3	0–2	1–0	1–2	0–1	1–1	0–4	2–4	3–1	1–0	0–1	0–1		0–1	2–0	1–1	2–3	1–2
Sevilla	2–1	4–0	1–0	0–3	1–2	1–0	2–0	0–1	0–1	3–1	1–0	1–1	0–2	2–4	1–0		4–3	0–0	4–1	1–0
Sporting Gijón	1–0	1–1	2–5	1–6	1–2	3–2	0–3	1–2	2–1	0–1	3–1	2–1	0–2	0–4	2–1	1–0		2–3	2–1	0–1
Valencia	3–2	2–0	3–1	2–2	3–2	4–2	2–1	4–1	1–1	3–0	4–0	1–0	2–4	3–0	1–1	3–1	2–3		1–2	3–3
Valladolid	2–0	2–1	2–1	0–1	1–3	3–0	1–1	1–0	1–3	3–0	0–0	0–0	0–1	1–0	1–1	3–2	1–2	0–1		0–0
Villarreal	2–1	2–0	4–4	1–2	2–1	1–0	1–0	3–3	0–2	2–0	2–1	1–1	2–0	3–2	2–1	0–2	2–1	3–1	0–3	

Source: LFP (in Spanish)
Legend: Blue = home team win; Yellow = draw; Red = away team win.

== Awards ==
=== La Liga Awards ===
For the first time in La Liga's history, its governing body, the Liga Nacional de Fútbol Profesional, honoured the competition's best players and coach with the La Liga Awards.

Award	Recipient
Best Player	(Argentina) Lionel Messi (Barcelona)
Best Coach	(Spain) Pep Guardiola (Barcelona)
Best Goalkeeper	(Spain) Iker Casillas (Real Madrid)
Best Defender	(Brazil) Dani Alves (Barcelona)
Best Midfielder(s)	(Spain) Xavi (Barcelona) (Spain) Andrés Iniesta (Barcelona)
Best Forward	(Argentina) Lionel Messi (Barcelona)

==== Team of the Year ====

Team of the Year
Goalkeeper	(Spain) Iker Casillas (Real Madrid)			
Defenders	(Brazil) Dani Alves (Barcelona)		(Spain) Carles Puyol (Barcelona)	(Brazil) Filipe Luís (Deportivo La Coruña)
Midfielders	(Spain) Jesús Navas (Sevilla)	(Spain) Xavi (Barcelona)	(Spain) Andrés Iniesta (Barcelona)	(Argentina) Gonzalo Higuaín (Real Madrid)
Forwards	(Argentina) Lionel Messi (Barcelona)		(Uruguay) Diego Forlán (Atlético Madrid)	(Spain) David Villa (Valencia)

=== Pichichi Trophy ===
The Pichichi Trophy is awarded to the player who scores the most goals in a season.

Rank	Player	Club	Goals
1	(Uruguay) Diego Forlán	Atlético Madrid	32
2	(Cameroon) Samuel Eto'o	Barcelona	30
3	(Spain) David Villa	Valencia	28
4	(Argentina) Lionel Messi	Barcelona	23
5	(Argentina) Gonzalo Higuaín	Real Madrid	22
6	(France) Thierry Henry	Barcelona	19
6	(Spain) Álvaro Negredo	Almería	19
8	(Mali) Frédéric Kanouté	Sevilla	18
8	(Spain) Raúl	Real Madrid	18
10	(Argentina) Sergio Agüero	Atlético Madrid	17

Source: Yahoo! Sport

=== Zamora Trophy ===
The Ricardo Zamora Trophy is awarded by newspaper Marca to the goalkeeper with the lowest ratio of goals conceded to matches played. A goalkeeper had to play at least 28 matches of 60 or more minutes to be eligible for the trophy.

Rank	Player	Club	Goals against	Matches	Average
1	(Spain) Víctor Valdés	Barcelona	31	35	0.89
2	(Spain) Andrés Palop	Sevilla	35	35	1.00
3	(Spain) Daniel Aranzubia	Deportivo La Coruña	45	37	1.22
4	(Spain) Toño	Racing Santander	41	33	1.24
5	(Cameroon) Carlos Kameni	Espanyol	47	37	1.27

Source: LFP

=== Top assists ===
Rank	Player	Club	Assists
1	(Spain) Xavi	Barcelona	20
2	(Spain) Juan Mata	Valencia	13
3	(Portugal) Duda	Málaga	11
3	(Argentina) Lionel Messi	Barcelona	11
5	(Uruguay) Diego Forlán	Atlético Madrid	10
5	(Spain) Pedro Munitis	Racing Santander	10
7	(Argentina) Sergio Agüero	Atlético Madrid	9
7	(Brazil) Dani Alves	Barcelona	9
7	(Venezuela) Juan Arango	Mallorca	9
7	(Argentina) Fernando Gago	Real Madrid	9
7	(Argentina) Gonzalo Higuaín	Real Madrid	9
7	(Spain) José Manuel Jurado	Mallorca	9
7	(Spain) Jesús Navas	Sevilla	9
7	(France) Robert Pires	Villarreal	9

- Source: ESPN Soccernet

=== Fair Play award ===
Rank	Club	Points
1	Barcelona	98
2	Deportivo La Coruña	102
3	Villarreal	110
4	Recreativo Huelva	113
5	Valladolid	114
6	Numancia	131
6	Valencia	131
8	Almería	132
9	Getafe	133
10	Espanyol	134
11	Mallorca	135
12	Atlético Madrid	136
12	Sevilla	136
14	Málaga	139
15	Osasuna	148
15	Real Madrid	148
17	Athletic Bilbao	149
18	Racing Santander	164
19	Real Betis	165
20	Sporting Gijón	183

- Source: 2008–09 Fair Play Rankings Season.

== Scoring ==
- First goal of the season:
  (Spain) Luis García for Espanyol against Valladolid (30 August 2008)
- Last goal of the season:
  (Brazil) Ricardo Oliveira for Real Betis against Valladolid (31 May 2009)

=== Hat-tricks ===
Player	For	Against	Result	Date	Reference
(Croatia) Mate Bilić	Sporting Gijón	Sevilla	3–4 (A)	13 September 2008	
(Netherlands) Rafael van der Vaart	Real Madrid	Sporting Gijón	7–1 (H)	24 September 2008	
(Cameroon) Samuel Eto'o	Barcelona	Almería	5–0 (H)	25 October 2008	
(Burundi) Mohamed Tchité	Racing Santander	Valencia	4–2 (A)	1 November 2008	
(Argentina) Gonzalo Higuaín^{4}	Real Madrid	Málaga	4–3 (H)	8 November 2008	
(Cameroon) Samuel Eto'o^{4}	Barcelona	Valladolid	6–0 (H)	8 November 2008	
(France) Thierry Henry	Barcelona	Valencia	4–0 (H)	9 December 2008	
(Spain) Roberto Soldado	Getafe	Sporting Gijón	5–1 (H)	25 January 2009	
(Mali) Frédéric Kanouté	Sevilla	Valladolid	4–1 (H)	21 March 2009	
(Spain) Raúl	Real Madrid	Sevilla	4–2 (A)	26 April 2009	
(Uruguay) Diego Forlán	Atlético Madrid	Athletic Bilbao	4–1 (A)	23 May 2009	
(Spain) Raúl Tamudo	Espanyol	Málaga	3–0 (H)	31 May 2009	

^{4} Player scored four goals(H) - Home; (A) - Away

=== Discipline ===
- First yellow card of the season: (France) Grégory Béranger for Espanyol against Valladolid (30 August 2008)
- First red card of the season: (Uruguay) Diego Godín for Villarreal against Osasuna (31 August 2008)

== Attendances ==
No.	Club	Average	Change	Highest
1	FC Barcelona	71,947	-5.6%	98,700
2	Real Madrid CF	71,328	5.6%	79,500
3	Atlético de Madrid	44,605	-1.4%	57,500
4	Sevilla FC	41,507	4.9%	45,500
5	Valencia CF	38,263	-6.0%	50,000
6	Real Betis	37,137	-0.8%	50,000
7	Athletic Club	35,000	-3.5%	40,000
8	Málaga CF	24,849	24.2%	30,000
9	RCD Espanyol	23,832	9.0%	35,000
10	Real Sporting de Gijón	22,945	36.8%	25,000
11	Villarreal CF	19,159	-1.2%	25,000
12	Real Racing Club de Santander	18,555	5.9%	22,200
13	Deportivo de La Coruña	18,316	2.9%	34,000
14	CA Osasuna	17,823	3.5%	19,031
15	Real Valladolid	17,417	-1.2%	23,600
16	Recreativo de Huelva	16,334	-6.0%	19,000
17	RCD Mallorca	15,184	-14.9%	22,000
18	UD Almería	12,715	-18.3%	18,000
19	Getafe CF	10,500	-1.5%	16,000
20	CD Numancia	8,096	60.4%	9,500

== See also ==
- List of Spanish football transfers summer 2008
- List of Spanish football transfers winter 2008–09
- 2008–09 Segunda División
- 2008–09 Copa del Rey
