= Real Betis =

Association football club in Spain

- Full name: Real Betis Balompié, S.A.D.
- Nicknames: Heliopolitanos (Heliopolitans); El Glorioso (The Glorious); Béticos (supporters)
- Short name: Betis
- Founded: 12 September 1907; 119 years ago (as Sevilla Balompié)
- Stadium: Estadio La Cartuja
- Capacity: 70,000
- President: Ángel Haro
- Head coach: Manuel Pellegrini
- League: La Liga
- 2025–26: La Liga, 5th of 20
- Website: realbetisbalompie.es
Home colours	Away colours	Third colours

Real Betis Balompie, known as Real Betis (pronounced [reˈal ˈbetis]), is a professional football club based in Seville, Andalusia, Spain. They compete in La Liga, the top flight of Spanish football. Traditionally, Real Betis play home matches at Estadio Benito Villamarín, which is the 4th biggest stadium in Laliga. However, since 2025, the club have played their home games at the 70,000-seat Estadio La Cartuja while awaiting the completion of a €262 million redevelopment of their traditional home.

Real Betis won the league title in 1935 and the Copa del Rey in 1977, 2005 and 2022. Given the club's tumultuous history and many relegations, its motto is ¡Viva el Betis manque pierda! (Long live Betis even when they lose!).

== History ==
The name "Betis" is derived from Baetis, the Roman name for the Guadalquivir river which passes through Seville and which the Roman province there was named after. Real ('Royal') was added in 1914 after the club received patronage from King Alfonso XIII.

=== Foundation ===
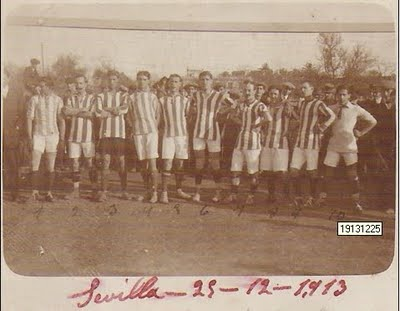
Real Betis, 25 December 1913

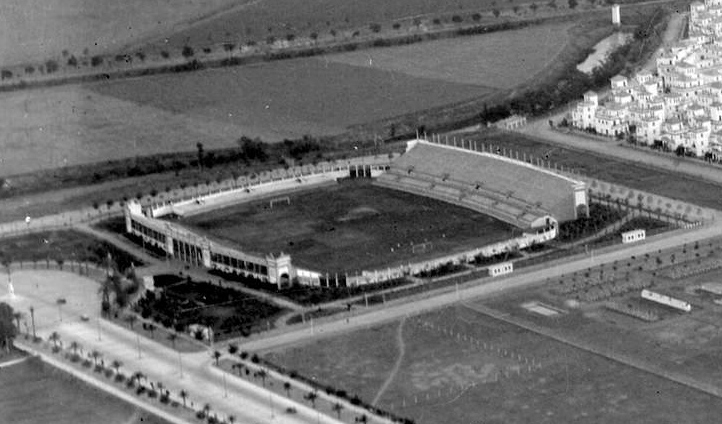
The grounds of the Estadio de la Exposición (now Benito Villamarín) in 1929

Betis' city rivals Sevilla were the first club in Seville, founded in October 1905, while a second club, España Balompié were established in September 1907. "Balompié" translates literally as "football", as opposed to the most commonly adopted anglicised version, "fútbol". Balompié was founded by students from the local Polytechnic Academy, and were in operation for one year before being officially recognised in 1909 as Sevilla Balompié; despite this, 1907 remains the official foundation date of the club.

Following an internal split from Sevilla FC, another club was formed, Betis Football Club. In 1914, they merged with Sevilla Balompié. The club received its royal patronage in the same year, and therefore adopted the name Real Betis Balompié. Fans continued to refer to the club as Balompié and were themselves known as Los Balompedistas until the 1930s, when Betis and the adjective Béticos became common terminology when discussing the club and its followers.

Real Betis originally played in all blue jerseys and white shorts, for no other reason than the easy availability of such plain colours. However, one of the club's founders and team captain, Manuel Ramos Asensio, was keen to take advantage of his relationships made while studying in Scotland, contacted the Irish-founded Scottish club Celtic, whose green and white colours matched the Andalusian regional flag, and obtained the same fabric Celtic used to make kits for his own club. Celtic originally wore green and white stripes but had reoriented a few years earlier to horizontal hoops. Ramos opted for vertical stripes to make the shirts as no other Spanish club used the combination at the time. In 2017 the club officially acknowledged the link with Celtic by producing a special hooped kit to coincide with Andalusia Day. The blue colour is still often used in away kit designs.

=== 1930s: promotion, championship and relegation ===
During the Spanish Second Republic (1931–1939), royal patronage of all organisations was nullified, and thus the club was known as Betis Balompié until after the Spanish Civil War when it would revert to the full name. The club reached the Copa del Presidente de la República final for the first time on 21 June 1931, when it lost 3–1 to Athletic Bilbao in Madrid. Betis marked their 25th anniversary year by winning their first Segunda División title in 1932, finishing two points ahead of Real Oviedo, thus becoming the first club from Andalusia to play in La Liga.

On 28 April 1935, under the guidance of Irish coach Patrick O'Connell, Betis won La Liga, to date their only top division title. They topped the table by a single point over Madrid FC. A year later Betis went down to seventh. This was due to the dismantling of the championship-winning team because of the club's poor economic situation and the arrival of the Civil War, meaning that just 15 months after winning the league title only two players who won in 1935 were left: Peral and Saro. No official league was held during the Civil War between 1936 and 1939, until its resumption for the 1939–40 season and the first year back highlighted Betis' decline as exactly five years after winning the title the club was relegated.

=== Darkest period ===
Despite a brief return to the top division which lasted only one season, the club continued to decline and in 1947 an all-time low was reached when the club were relegated to Tercera División. Many fans see the ten years they spent in the category as key to the "identity" and "soul" of the club. During this time, Betis earned a reputation for filling its stadium and having massive support at away matches, known as the "Green March".

When the side returned to the second level in 1954, it gained the distinction of being the only club in Spain to have won all three major divisions' titles. Much of the credit for guiding Betis through this dark period and back into the Segunda lies with chairman Manuel Ruiz Rodríguez.

=== Benito Villamarín ===
In 1955, Manuel Ruiz Rodríguez stepped down from running the club believing he could not offer further economic growth, he was replaced by Betis most famous former president, Benito Villamarín. During his reign Betis returned to the top division in 1958–59 and finished in third place in 1964. His purchase of the Estadio Heliópolis in 1961 is seen as a key point in the history of the club – the grounds were named after him as Estadio Benito Villamarín. In 1965, Villamarín stepped down from his position after ten years at the helm of the club.

Just one year after Villamarín's departure, the club would again be relegated to division two, then rising and falling almost consecutively until consolidating their place in the top level in 1974–75.

=== First Copa del Rey Title and European Qualification ===
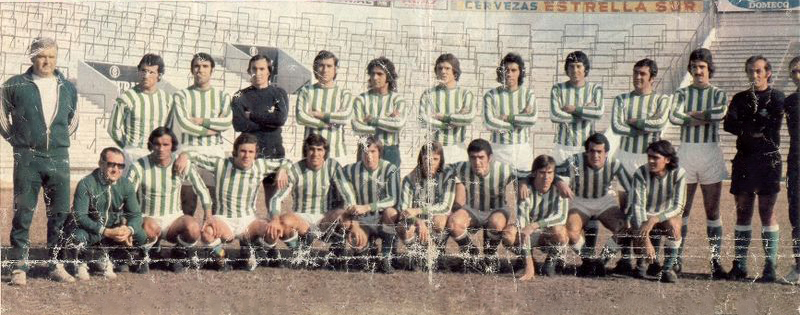
1974–75 Real Betis squad

On 25 June 1977, Betis played Athletic Bilbao at the Vicente Calderón Stadium in the Copa del Rey final. The match finished 2–2, with Betis winning 8–7 after a staggering 21 penalties taken to win its first ever Copa del Rey title. This rounded off a solid season in which the club finished fifth in the league.

After that triumph, Betis competed in the European Cup Winners' Cup: after knocking out Milan 3–2 on aggregate in the first round, the side reached the quarter-finals, where they lost to Dynamo Moscow. Despite their strong performance in Europe, the team suffered league relegation.

The following year, Betis returned to the top flight and ushered in a period of "good times" for the club, with the next three seasons seeing three top-six finishes, as well as UEFA Cup qualification in 1982 and 1984.

During the summer of 1982, the Benito Villamarín hosted two matches as part of the 1982 FIFA World Cup, and also witnessed the Spain national team's famous 12–1 hammering of Malta to qualify for UEFA Euro 1984.

=== Economic crisis and Manuel Ruiz de Lopera ===
Chart of Real Betis league performance 1929–present

In 1992, Betis found itself subject to new league rules and regulations due to its restructuring as an autonomous sporting group (SAD), requiring the club to come up with 1,200 million pesetas, roughly double that of all the first and second division teams, despite being in level two at the time.

In just three months, the fans raised 400 million pesetas with then vice-president Manuel Ruiz de Lopera stepping in to provide an economic guarantee while himself becoming majority shareholder as the team narrowly avoided relegation.

On 11 September 1994, Real Betis played its 1,000th game in La Liga.

=== Serra Ferrer success ===
After another three seasons in the second division, with the club managed by Lorenzo Serra Ferrer, Betis returned to the top flight for the 1994–95 season, subsequently achieving a final third position, thus qualifying to the UEFA Cup.

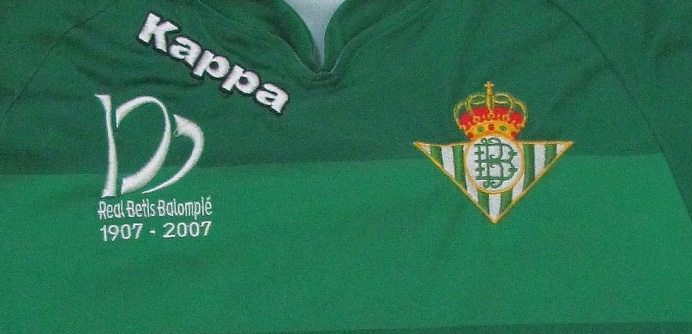
Betis' shirts in 2007 bore an emblem for their centenary.

In the European campaign, Betis knocked out Fenerbahçe (4–1 on aggregate) and 1. FC Kaiserslautern (4–1) before losing to defeated finalists Bordeaux (3–2). In 1997, 20 years after winning the trophy for the first time, the club returned to the final of the Copa del Rey – again held in Madrid, although this time at the Santiago Bernabéu Stadium – losing 2–3 against Barcelona after extra time.

Incidentally, Barça was the club Serra Ferrer would leave Betis for that summer, to be replaced by former player Luis Aragonés. Aragonés would only last one season with the club, leading the side to the eighth position and to the quarter-finals in the Cup Winners' Cup, where they would lose 2–5 on aggregate to eventual winners Chelsea.

Aragonés was followed by the controversial reign of Javier Clemente, who spat on a fan and implied Andalusia was "another country!". The team slipped down the table, finishing 11th and being knocked out of the UEFA Cup by Bologna in the third round. For the next couple of seasons, Betis went through numerous managers, a relegation and a promotion, after which the team finished sixth in the league with Juande Ramos at the helm.

Ramos was gone after just one season, however, being replaced by former Cup Winners' Cup-winning manager Víctor Fernández. He led the team to eighth and ninth in the league and the third round of the 2002–03 UEFA Cup, being knocked out by Auxerre (1–2 on aggregate), during his two-year reign.

For 2004, Fernández was replaced by the returning Serra Ferrer, who guided the team to the fourth position in the top flight. They also returned to the Vicente Calderón on 11 June 2005 for the Copa del Rey final, lifting the trophy for only the second time after an extra-time winner by youth graduate Dani in a 2–1 win against Osasuna.

The league finish meant Betis became the first Andalusian team to compete in the UEFA Champions League, and it reached the group stage after disposing of Monaco in the last qualifying round (3–2 on aggregate). Drawn in Group G, and in spite of a 1–0 home win against Chelsea, the club eventually finished third, being "demoted" to the UEFA Cup, where it would be ousted in the round of 16 by Romanian club Steaua București with a 0–3 home loss. Compared to the previous season, the league campaign was disappointing, with the club finishing in 14th place, just three points off the relegation zone.

=== Centenary celebrations ===
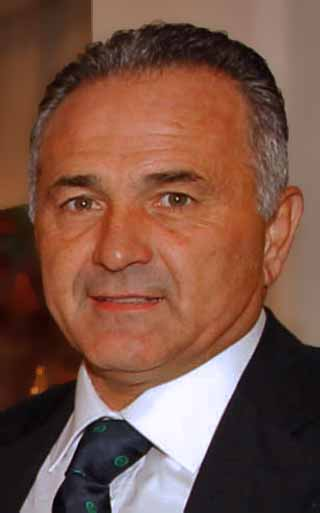
Rafael Gordillo, Betis player and president

Betis celebrated their centenary year in 2007. The festivities included a special match against Milan, the reigning European Champions, on August 9, with the hosts winning 1–0 thanks to a Mark González penalty early in the second half. Seven days later, the club won the Ramón de Carranza Trophy held in neighbouring Cádiz, beating Real Zaragoza on penalties in the final, having defeated Real Madrid in the semi-finals.

Surrounding the celebration, it was a time of great change in terms of the playing and technical teams, with eight new signings replacing 14 departures. In the summer of 2006, Serra Ferrer was replaced by Luis Fernandez for the 2006–07 season. However, the two seasons that encompassed the centenary year (2006–07 and 2007–08) were disappointing, with the club having four different managers and barely avoiding relegation in both seasons.

=== Relegation ===
After many years of staving off relegation, Betis' 2008–09 season culminated with a 1–1 draw against Real Valladolid at home. As a result, the club finished 18th in the table and consequently was relegated to the second division on goal difference.

On 15 June 2009 over 65,000 Beticos, including icons such as Rafael Gordillo, Del Sol, Hipólito Rincón, Julio Cardeñosa and others, joined the protest march in Sevilla with the slogan "15-J Yo Voy Betis" to let the majority owner Ruiz de Lopera know that it was time to put his 54% share of the club on the market for someone, some entity or the Betis supporters to buy those shares and remove Lopera from the day-to-day operations of the club.

Despite the protests, no upper management changes were made during the season, which would ultimately see Betis fail to gain promotion back to the top level.

=== Lopera court action and sale ===
Seville judge Mercedes Alaya was investigating links between Betis and other Ruiz de Lopera-owned businesses, leading to him being formally charged with fraud. On 7 July 2010, one week before the start of preliminary court proceedings, Lopera sold 94% of the shares that he owned (51% of Betis total shares) to Bitton Sport, fronted by Luis Oliver, for the surprisingly low figure of €16 million, leaving Lopera with only minor shares; Oliver had already reportedly taken two football clubs, Cartagena and Xerez, to the brink of bankruptcy.

Before the sale could be officially sanctioned, however, Ayala froze Lopera shareholdings. Left with nothing, despite putting down a €1 million deposit, Oliver hastily bought a nominal number of shares from a third party and was voted onto the board of directors by the existing members (all former cohorts of Lopera), allowing him to carry on running the club. In response to this, the judge appointed well-respected former Betis, Real Madrid and Spain national team legend Rafael Gordillo to administer Lopera's shares to ensure Lopera was not still running the club and that decisions made were for the benefit of the club not individual board members.

=== La Liga return ===
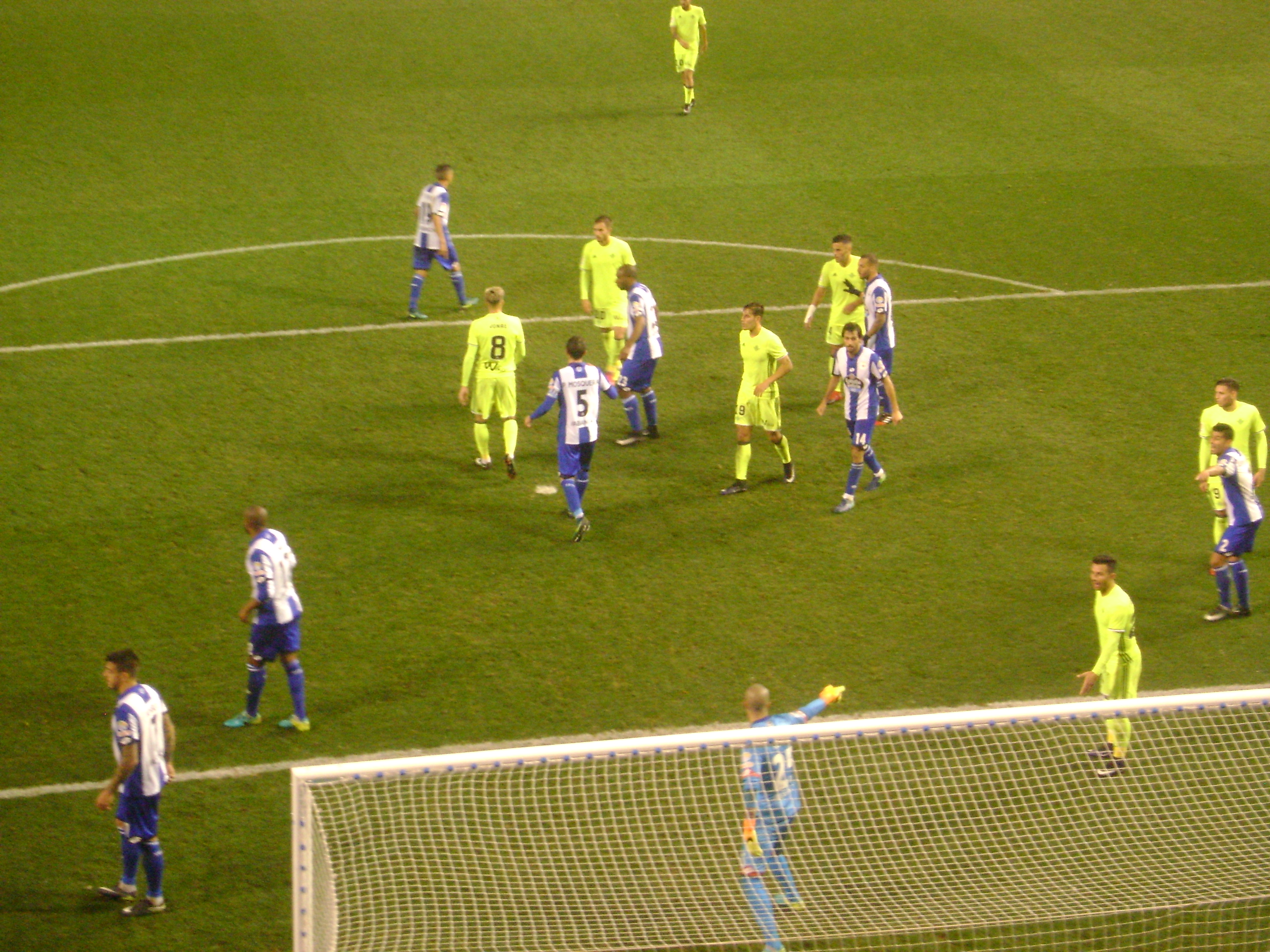
Deportivo de La Coruña vs. Betis

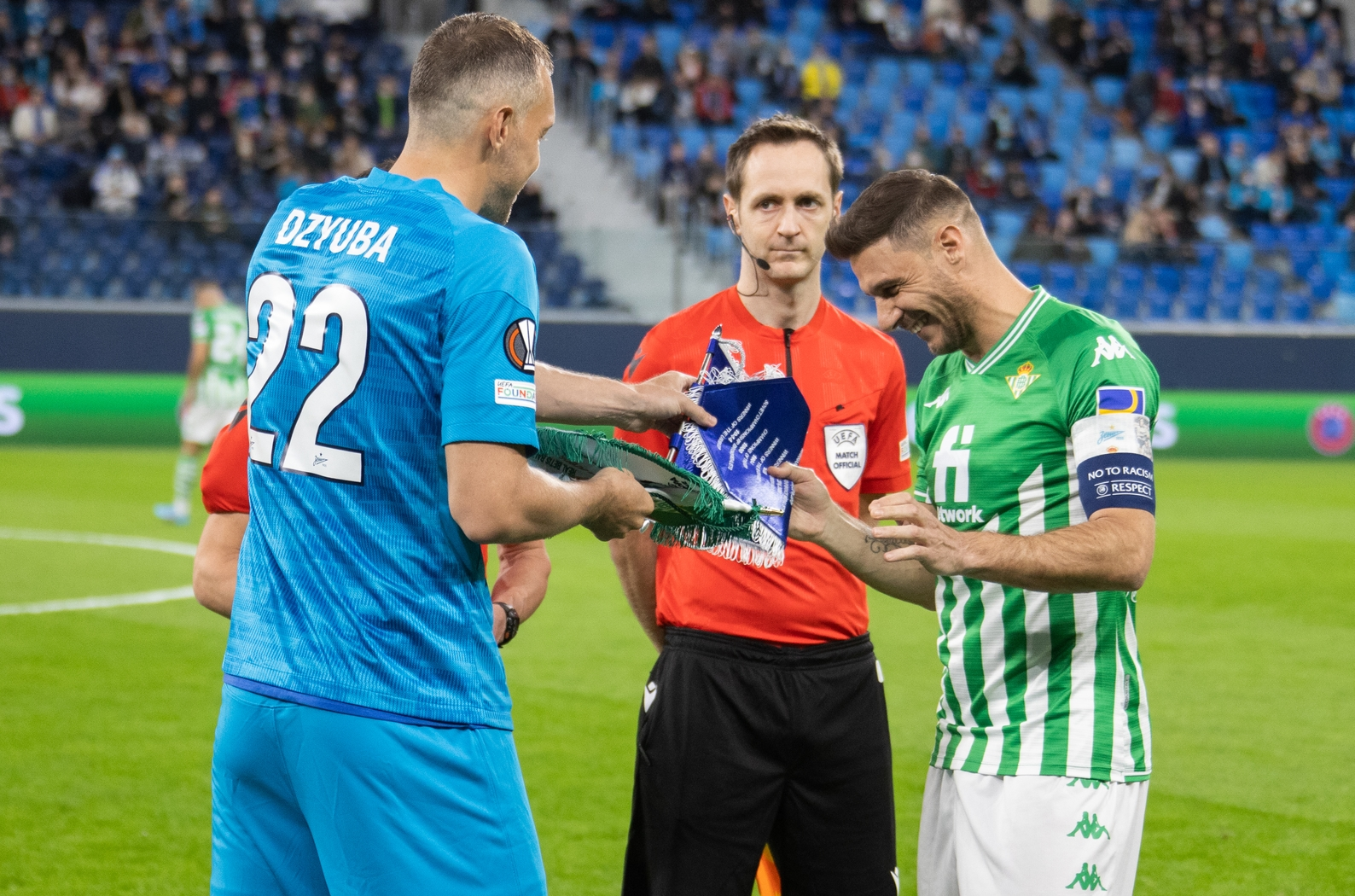
Captain Joaquín before an away Europa League fixture in Saint Petersburg in February 2022

Again under Pepe Mel, Betis started 2011–12 with four wins in as many games, with Rubén Castro retaining his goal scoring form from the previous season, where he scored 27 goals. Betis finished 13th in their first season since returning to La Liga.

In the 2012–13 season, Betis finished seventh in La Liga and qualified for the 2013–14 UEFA Europa League, the first European qualification for the club since the 2005–06 Champions League. This European campaign ended in the quarter-finals after losing on penalties to local rivals Sevilla. Betis were relegated from La Liga with three games still to play in the 2013–14 season, but returned immediately as champions with two games to spare.

=== Back into UEFA competitions ===
In the 2017–18 season, under Quique Setién, Betis finished sixth in La Liga and earned a spot in the Europa League. The 2018–19 campaign was very positive; the club reached the Copa del Rey semi-finals and topped their group in the Europa League, before eventually being knocked out by Stade Rennais in the round of 32.

On 9 July 2020, Manuel Pellegrini was appointed as Betis manager ahead of the 2020–21 season. He guided them to a sixth-place finish and a Europa League spot, an improvement from 15th the previous season.

Betis won the Copa del Rey final against Valencia after drawing 1–1 after 120 minutes and winning 5–4 on penalties. It was the first trophy for 17 years, since the 2005 edition.

The club displayed consistency under Pellegrini's management by qualifying for the UEFA Europa League for three consecutive seasons, finishing fifth and sixth in the 2021–22 and 2022–23 seasons, respectively. The club qualified for the Conference League after a seventh-place finish in 2023–24 season and reached the club's first ever European final the following season. However, they lost to Chelsea 1–4.

Betis was able to qualify for the UEFA Champions League for the first time in twenty years following their 5th place finish in the 2025–26 season.

== Seville derby ==
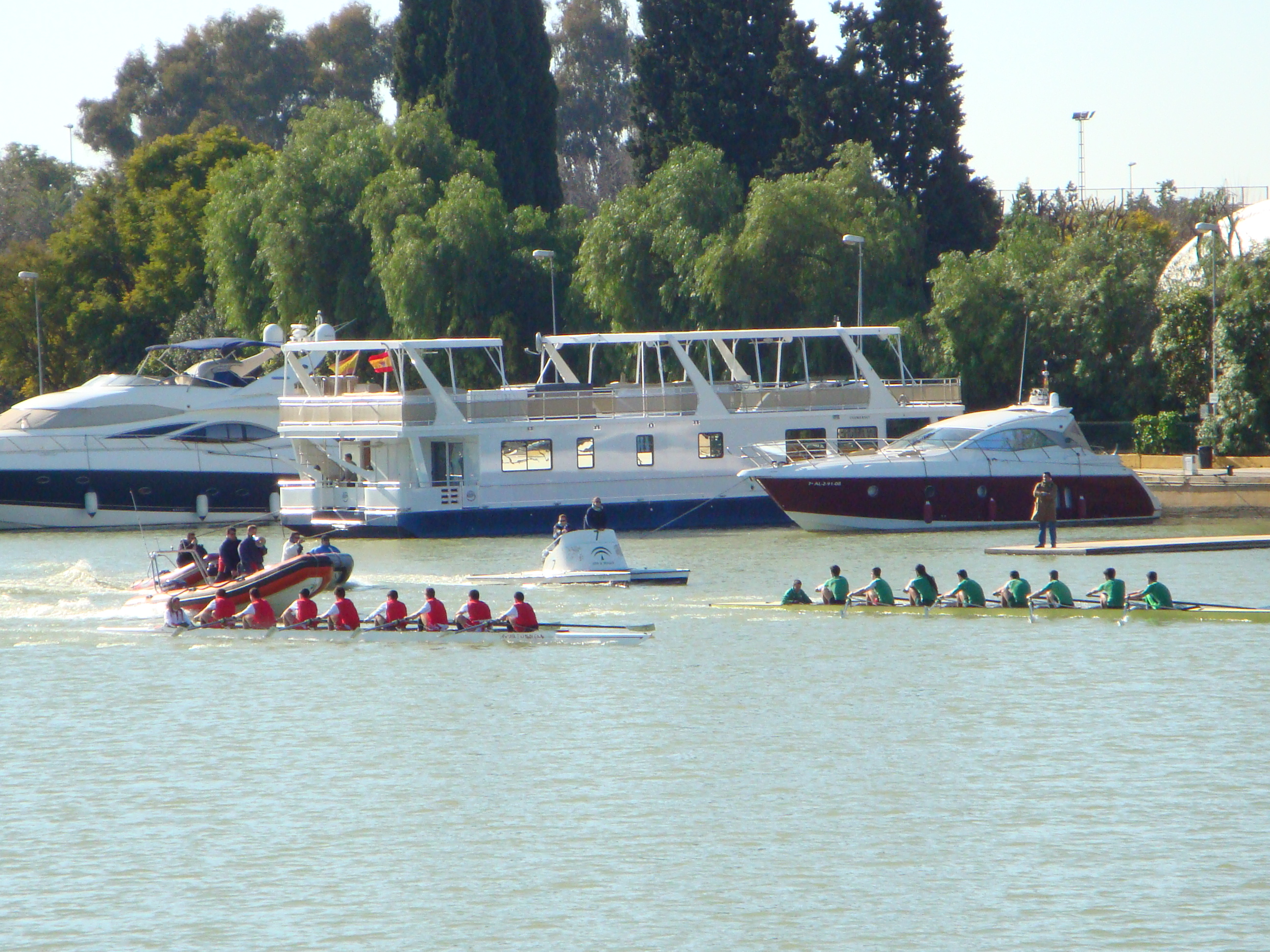
Betis and their city rival, Sevilla FC, also compete in an annual rowing race on the Guadalquivir river.

Betis have a long-standing rivalry with city neighbours Sevilla FC. The two have met 114 times in official competition, with Sevilla holding a 45% win ratio over Betis (31%).

The first match between the two clubs took place on 8 February 1915, with Sevilla winning 4–3. The match was not completed, as high tensions led an aggressive crowd to invade the pitch, forcing the referee to abandon the match.

In 1916, the first Copa Andalucía was held, this being the first official derby of the Sevilla area. Of the 17 runnings of the cup, Sevilla were victorious 14 times, to Betis' one sole conquest; this included a 22–0 routing after the latter sent their youth team, in 1918.

The first time the teams met in league, in Segunda, happened in 1928–29, with both teams winning their home matches (3–0 and 2–1). They played for the first time in the Spanish top division during the 1934–35 season, with a 0–3 home defeat for Sevilla and a 2–2 draw at Betis, with the latter winning the national championship.

On 17 January 1943, Betis lost 5–0 at Sevilla, eventually being relegated. In the first game held at the Ramón Sánchez Pizjuán Stadium, on 21 September 1958, the Verdiblancos won it 4–2.

In later years, several matches were also marred by violence, including: a security guard attacked by a Sevilla fan with a crutch (that he did not require to walk), Betis goalkeeper Toni Prats being attacked and Sevilla manager Juande Ramos being struck by a bottle of water; the latter incident led to the 2007 Copa del Rey match being suspended, being played out three weeks later in Getafe with no spectators.

On 7 February 2009 Betis won 2–1 at the Pizjuán, but was eventually relegated from the top flight, while Sevilla finished in third position.

On 9 November 2019 more than 10,000 Betis fans visited the team training before the last derby in 2019.

=== Statistics ===
As of 28 April 2024

Competition	Matches	Betis wins	Draws	Sevilla wins	Betis goals	Sevilla goals
Primera División	106	30	27	49	125	160
Segunda División	14	4	4	6	15	20
Copa del Rey/Copa del Generalísimo	19	5	5	9	21	32
UEFA Europa League	2	1	0	1	2	2
Overall	141	40	36	65	163	214

== History in European competitions ==
Accurate as of 21 October 2026

Competition	Played	Won	Drew	Lost	GF	GA	GD	Win%
UEFA Champions League	11	6	2	3	13	13	+0	54.55
UEFA Cup Winners' Cup	12	5	3	4	15	13	+2	41.67
UEFA Cup / UEFA Europa League	82	42	17	23	122	84	+38	51.22
UEFA Europa Conference League / UEFA Conference League	19	9	5	5	29	18	+11	47.37
Total	124	62	27	35	179	128	+51	50.00

Source: UEFA.com
Pld = Matches played; W = Matches won; D = Matches drawn; L = Matches lost; GF = Goals for; GA = Goals against; GD = Goal difference.

== Team statistics ==
=== Season to season ===
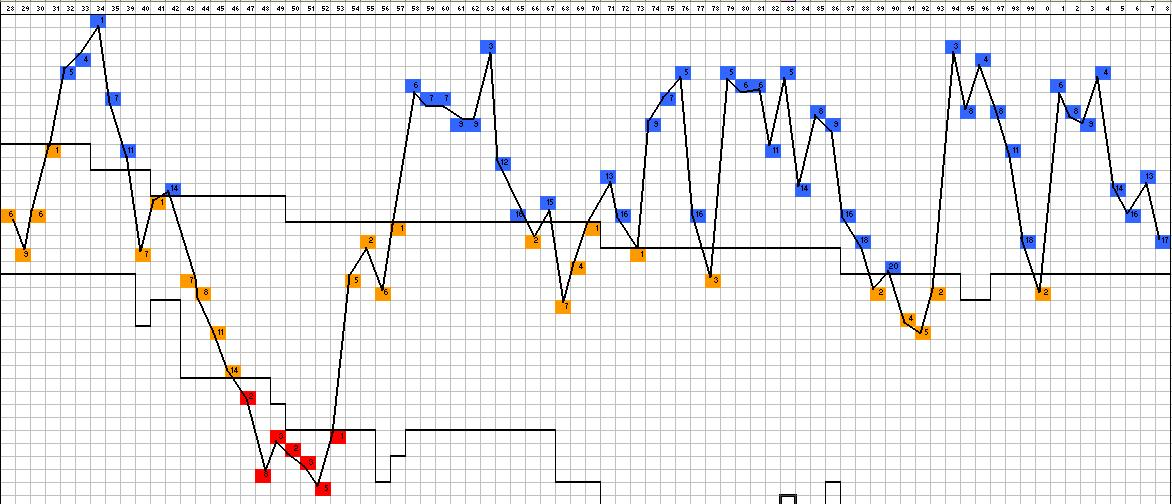
Betis historical classification

Season	Tier	Division	Place	Copa del Rey
1929	2	2ª	6th	Round of 32
1929–30	2	2ª	9th	Round of 16
1930–31	2	2ª	6th	Runners-up
1931–32	2	2ª	1st	Round of 16
1932–33	1	1ª	5th	Quarter-finals
1933–34	1	1ª	4th	Semi-finals
1934–35	1	1ª	1st	Quarter-finals
1935–36	1	1ª	7th	Quarter-finals
1939–40	1	1ª	11th	Round of 16
1940–41	2	2ª	7th	Round of 16
1941–42	2	2ª	1st	First round
1942–43	1	1ª	14th	Round of 16
1943–44	2	2ª	7th	Round of 32
1944–45	2	2ª	8th	First round
1945–46	2	2ª	11th	First round
1946–47	2	2ª	14th	Round of 16
1947–48	3	3ª	2nd	Fifth round
1948–49	3	3ª	8th	Second round
1949–50	3	3ª	3rd	DNP
1950–51	3	3ª	2nd	DNP

Season	Tier	Division	Place	Copa del Rey
1951–52	3	3ª	3rd	DNP
1952–53	3	3ª	5th	DNP
1953–54	3	3ª	1st	DNP
1954–55	2	2ª	5th	DNP
1955–56	2	2ª	2nd	DNP
1956–57	2	2ª	6th	DNP
1957–58	2	2ª	1st	DNP
1958–59	1	1ª	6th	Quarter-finals
1959–60	1	1ª	7th	Round of 16
1960–61	1	1ª	6th	Semi-finals
1961–62	1	1ª	9th	Round of 16
1962–63	1	1ª	9th	Quarter-finals
1963–64	1	1ª	3rd	Quarter-finals
1964–65	1	1ª	12th	Round of 32
1965–66	1	1ª	16th	Semi-finals
1966–67	2	2ª	2nd	Round of 16
1967–68	1	1ª	15th	Round of 16
1968–69	2	2ª	7th	DNP
1969–70	2	2ª	4th	Round of 16
1970–71	2	2ª	1st	Round of 16

Season	Tier	Division	Place	Copa del Rey
1971–72	1	1ª	13th	Fourth round
1972–73	1	1ª	16th	Quarter-finals
1973–74	2	2ª	1st	Round of 16
1974–75	1	1ª	9th	Round of 16
1975–76	1	1ª	7th	Semi-finals
1976–77	1	1ª	5th	Winners
1977–78	1	1ª	16th	Quarter-finals
1978–79	2	2ª	3rd	Third round
1979–80	1	1ª	5th	Quarter-finals
1980–81	1	1ª	6th	Second round
1981–82	1	1ª	6th	Fourth round
1982–83	1	1ª	11th	Round of 16
1983–84	1	1ª	5th	Third round
1984–85	1	1ª	14th	Semi-finals
1985–86	1	1ª	8th	Third round
1986–87	1	1ª	9th	Round of 16
1987–88	1	1ª	16th	Round of 16
1988–89	1	1ª	18th	Round of 16
1989–90	2	2ª	2nd	Round of 16
1990–91	1	1ª	20th	Round of 16

Season	Tier	Division	Place	Copa del Rey
1991–92	2	2ª	4th	Round of 16
1992–93	2	2ª	5th	Fifth round
1993–94	2	2ª	2nd	Semi-finals
1994–95	1	1ª	3rd	Round of 16
1995–96	1	1ª	8th	Round of 16
1996–97	1	1ª	4th	Runners-up
1997–98	1	1ª	8th	Quarter-finals
1998–99	1	1ª	11th	Round of 16
1999–2000	1	1ª	18th	Second round
2000–01	2	2ª	2nd	Round of 64
2001–02	1	1ª	6th	Round of 64
2002–03	1	1ª	8th	Round of 16
2003–04	1	1ª	9th	Round of 16
2004–05	1	1ª	4th	Winners
2005–06	1	1ª	14th	Quarter-finals
2006–07	1	1ª	16th	Quarter-finals
2007–08	1	1ª	13th	Round of 16
2008–09	1	1ª	18th	Quarter-finals
2009–10	2	2ª	4th	Second round
2010–11	2	2ª	1st	Quarter-finals

Season	Tier	Division	Place	Copa del Rey
2011–12	1	1ª	13th	Round of 32
2012–13	1	1ª	7th	Quarter-finals
2013–14	1	1ª	20th	Round of 16
2014–15	2	2ª	1st	Round of 32
2015–16	1	1ª	10th	Round of 16
2016–17	1	1ª	15th	Round of 32
2017–18	1	1ª	6th	Round of 32
2018–19	1	1ª	10th	Semi-finals
2019–20	1	1ª	15th	Round of 32
2020–21	1	1ª	6th	Quarter-finals
2021–22	1	1ª	5th	Winners
2022–23	1	1ª	6th	Round of 16
2023–24	1	1ª	7th	Round of 32
2024–25	1	1ª	6th	Round of 16
2025–26	1	1ª	5th	Quarter-finals
2026–27	1	1ª	4th	TBD

- 61 seasons in La Liga
- 28 seasons in Segunda División
- 7 seasons in Tercera División (as third tier)
- Participations in UEFA Champions League: 1
- Participations in UEFA Cup: 7
- Participations in UEFA Cup Winners' Cup: 2

=== Recent La Liga seasons ===
Real Betis were relegated from La Liga in both the 1999–2000 and 2013–14 seasons but were promoted back on their first attempt each time.

Season	Pos	Pld	W	D	L	GF	GA	Pts
1996–97	4th	42	21	14	7	81	46	77
1997–98	8th	38	17	8	13	49	50	59
1998–99	11th	38	14	7	17	47	58	49
1999–2000	18th	38	11	9	18	33	56	42
2001–02	6th	38	15	14	9	42	34	59
2002–03	8th	38	14	12	12	56	53	54
2003–04	9th	38	13	13	12	46	43	52
2004–05	4th	38	16	14	8	62	50	62
2005–06	14th	38	10	12	16	34	51	42
2006–07	16th	38	8	16	14	36	49	40
2007–08	13th	38	12	11	15	45	51	47
2008–09	18th	38	10	12	16	51	58	42
2011–12	13th	38	13	8	17	47	56	47
2012–13	7th	38	16	8	14	57	56	56
2013–14	20th	38	6	7	25	36	78	25
2015–16	10th	38	11	12	15	34	52	45
2016–17	15th	38	10	9	19	41	64	39
2017–18	6th	38	18	6	14	60	61	60
2018–19	10th	38	14	8	16	44	52	50
2019–20	15th	38	10	11	17	48	60	41
2020–21	6th	38	17	10	11	50	50	61
2021–22	5th	38	19	8	11	62	40	65
2022–23	6th	38	17	9	12	46	41	60
2023–24	7th	38	14	15	9	48	45	57
2024–25	6th	38	16	12	10	57	50	60
2025–26	5th	38	15	15	8	59	48	60

== Players ==
=== First-team ===
As of 1 September 2026

Note: Flags indicate national team as defined under FIFA eligibility rules; some limited exceptions apply. Players may hold more than one non-FIFA nationality.

No.	Pos.	Nation	Player
1	GK	ESP	Álvaro Valles
2	DF	ESP	Héctor Bellerín (3rd captain)
3	DF	ESP	Diego Llorente
4	DF	BRA	Natan
5	DF	ESP	Marc Bartra (vice-captain)
6	MF	URU	Facundo Bernal
7	FW	BRA	Antony
8	MF	ESP	Pablo Fornals
9	FW	COL	Cucho Hernández
10	FW	MAR	Abde Ezzalzouli
11	DF	ESP	Fran García
12	DF	ESP	Ángel Ortiz
13	GK	ESP	Diego Conde (on loan from Villarreal)

No.	Pos.	Nation	Player
14	FW	ESP	Iker Losada
15	MF	MEX	Álvaro Fidalgo
16	DF	ARG	Valentín Gómez
17	MF	ESP	Rodrigo Riquelme
18	MF	COL	Nelson Deossa
19	FW	IRL	Troy Parrott
20	MF	ARG	Giovanni Lo Celso
21	MF	ESP	Marc Roca
22	MF	ESP	Isco (captain)
23	DF	DOM	Junior Firpo
24	FW	ESP	Aitor Ruibal (4th captain)
25	MF	ESP	Dani Ceballos

=== Reserve team ===
Note: Flags indicate national team as defined under FIFA eligibility rules; some limited exceptions apply. Players may hold more than one non-FIFA nationality.

No.	Pos.	Nation	Player
27	FW	ESP	José Antonio Morante
29	FW	ESP	Rodrigo Marina
30	GK	UKR	Yan Zhuravskyi
31	GK	ESP	Manu González
37	MF	ESP	Rica Fúnez

No.	Pos.	Nation	Player
39	FW	ESP	Borja Alonso
40	GK	ESP	Álvaro de Pablo (on loan from Valladolid)
50	MF	ESP	Iván Corralejo
51	GK	ESP	Alejandro Postigo

=== Out on loan ===
Note: Flags indicate national team as defined under FIFA eligibility rules; some limited exceptions apply. Players may hold more than one non-FIFA nationality.

No.	Pos.	Nation	Player
—	FW	URU	Gonzalo Petit (at Cádiz until 30 June 2027)

=== Retired numbers ===
26 (Spain) Miki Roqué (deceased) (2009–12)

== Player records ==
=== Most appearances ===
Rank	Player	Matches
1	(Spain) Joaquín	528
2	(Spain) José Ramón Esnaola	378
3	(Spain) Rafael Gordillo	343
4	(Spain) Julio Cardeñosa	337
5	(Spain) Francisco López	328
6	(Spain) Juan Merino	315
7	(Spain) Antonio Benítez	305
8	(Spain) Juanjo Cañas	303
9	(Spain) Rogelio Sosa	300
10	(Spain) Francisco Bizcocho	285

=== Most goals ===
Rank	Player	Goals
1	(Spain) Rubén Castro	148
2	(Spain) Francisco González	109
3	(Spain) Manuel Domínguez	98
4	(Spain) Poli Rincón	93
5	(Spain) Rogelio Sosa	92
6	(Spain) Alfonso Pérez	80
7	(Spain) Jorge Molina	77
8	(Spain) Joaquín	68
9	(Spain) Joaquín Sierra	59
10	(Spain) Fernando Ansola	54

== Personnel ==
=== Board of directors ===
Position	Staff
President	(Spain) Ángel Haro
Vice president and chief executive officer	(Spain) José Miguel López
Board members	(Spain) José María Pagola Serra (Turkey) Ozgur Unay Unay (Spain) José María Gallego Moyano (Spain) Rafael Muela (Spain) Ricardo Díaz Andrés (Spain) Joaquín
Secretary of the board	(Spain) Carlos González de Castro

Last updated: 8 April 2026
Source: Real Betis

=== Technical staff ===
Position	Staff
Sporting director	(Spain) Manu Fajardo
Assistant sporting director	(Spain) Alexis Trujillo
General manager	(Spain) Ramón Alarcón
Business director	(Spain) Federico Martínez
Director of professional football	(Spain) Toni Ortega Gallert
Scouting area	(Spain) Àlex Gómez (Spain) Mariano Suárez (Spain) Juan Merino (Spain) Dani Fernández

=== Coaching staff ===
Position	Staff
Head coach	(Chile) Manuel Pellegrini
Assistant head coach	(Argentina) Rubén Cousillas (Spain) Fernando
Goalkeeping coach	(Spain) Toni Doblas
Fitness coach	(Spain) José Cabello (Spain) Félix Fernández
Rehab coach	(Spain) Eneko Angulo
Team delegate	(Spain) Curro Martínez Picchi
Delegate	(Spain) Víctor Antequera
Head of medical services	(Spain) Tomás Calero
Coordinator of medical services	(Spain) Javier Guillén
Club doctor	(Spain) José Manuel Álvarez
Head of physiotherapist	(Spain) David Álvarez
Physiotherapist	(Spain) Fabio Soria Guerra (Spain) Juan Antonio García Boza (Spain) Alex Fernández (Spain) Arsenio Redondo Barragán (Spain) Rafa Alonso (Spain) José Fernández Aranegas
Equipment manager	(Spain) Antonio Raya (Spain) Javier Martín (Spain) Borja González

== Honours ==
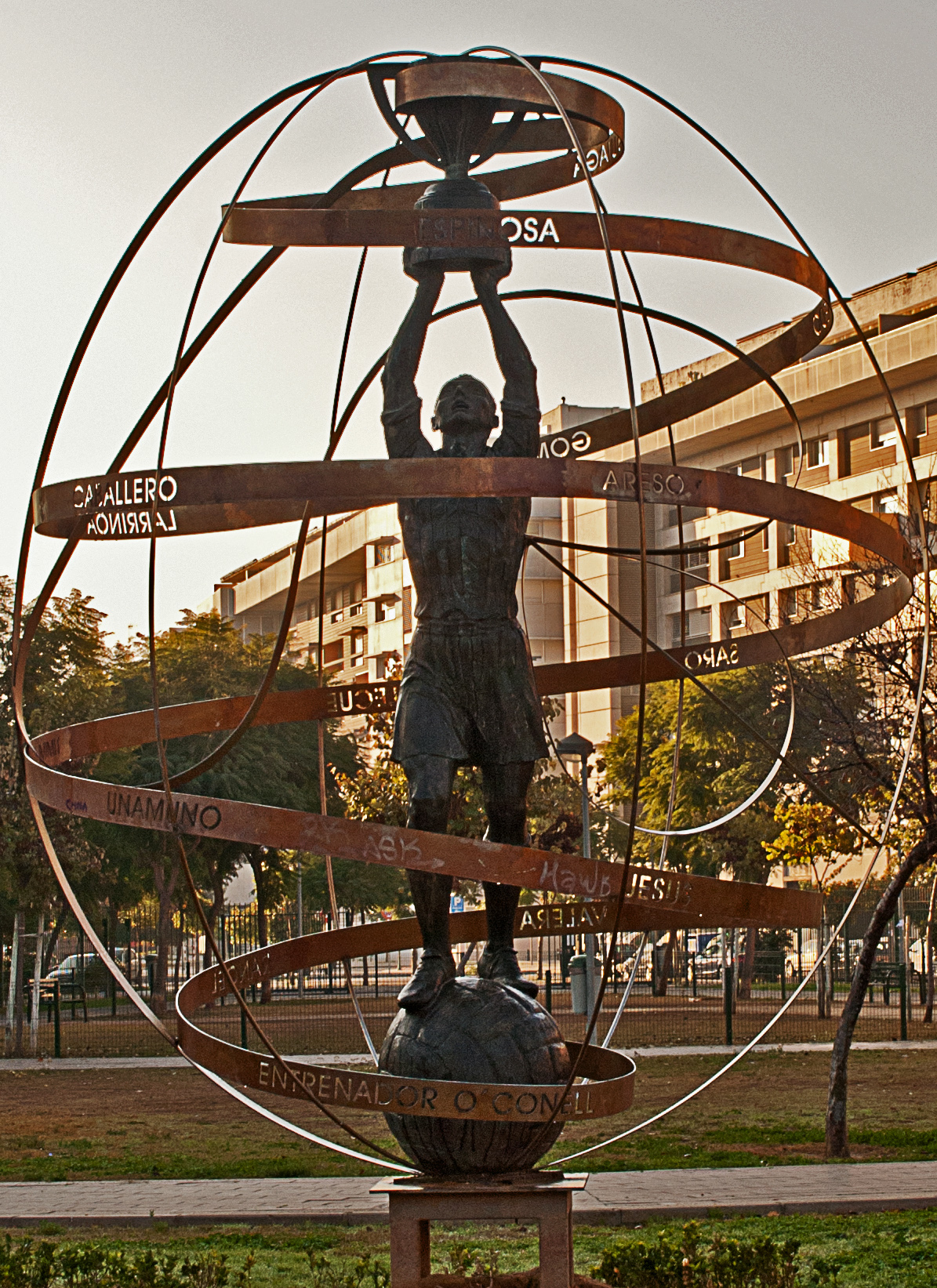
Betis' 1934–35 La Liga title is commemorated by this sculpture in Seville.

Real Betis Balompie has won all the national championships there are.

=== Leagues ===
- La Liga
  - Winners (1): 1934–35
- Segunda División
  - Winners (7): 1931–32, 1941–42, 1957–58, 1970–71, 1973–74, 2010–11, 2014–15
- Tercera División
  - Winners (1): 1953–54

=== Cups ===
- Copa del Rey
  - Winners (3): 1976–77, 2004–05, 2021–22
- Copa Federación de España
  - Winners (1): 1953–54

=== European competitions ===
- UEFA Conference League
  - Runners-up (1): 2024–25

=== Others ===
- Campeonato Regional Sur (defunct)
  - Winners (1): 1927–28
- Bahía de Cartagena Trophy (defunct)
  - Winners (1): 2002

== Coaches ==
Coach	Year	Notes
(Spain) Manuel Ramos Asencio	1911–14, 1914–15	
(England) Herbert Richard Jones	1914, 1916	Also first president
(England) J.P. Bryce	1917	
(Spain) Carmelo Navarro	1918	
(Spain) Basilio Clemente	1918	
(Spain) Salvador Llinat	1920	
(Spain) Andrés Aranda	1922, 1939–40, 1943–46, 1949–52, 1965	
(Spain) Ramón Porlan y Merlo	1923	
(Spain) Alberto Álvarez	1924	
(Spain) Carlos Castañeda	1925	
(Spain) Juan Armet "Kinké"	1927–30	First year of league competition (1929)
(Spain) Emilio Sampere	1930–32	Copa del Rey runner-up 1931; Segunda champion 1932
(Republic of Ireland) Patrick O'Connell	1932–36, 1940–42, 1946–47	La Liga champion 1935
(Spain) Cesáreo Baragaño	1942–43	
(Spain) Francisco Gómez	1942–43, 1953–55	Tercera champion, 1954
(Spain) Pedro Solé	1944–45	
(Spain) José Suárez "Peral"	1946–47, 1948–49	
(Spain) José Quirante	1947–48	
(Spain) Manuel Olivares	1952–53	
(Spain) Sabino Barinaga	1955, 1960, 1968–69	
(Spain) Pepe Valera	1955–57, 1967–68	
(Spain) Carlos Iturraspe	1957	
(Spain) Antonio Barrios	1957–59, 1967, 1969–72	Segunda champion 1958 and 1971
(Spain) Josep Seguer	1959	
(Uruguay) Enrique Fernández	1959–60	
(Czechoslovakia) Ferdinand Daučík	1960–63, 1968–69	
(Spain) Ernesto Pons	1963, 1965, 1966	
(Spain) Domènec Balmanya	1963–64	
(France) Louis Hon	1964–65	
(Brazil) Martim Francisco	1965–66	
(Spain) Luis Belló	1966–67	
(Spain) César	1967–68	
(Spain) Miguel González	1969–70	
(Spain) Esteban Areta	1971–72	
(Hungary) Ferenc Szusza	1972–76	Segunda champion 1974
(Spain) Rafael Iriondo	1976–78, 1981–82	Copa del Rey winner, 1977
(Spain) José Luis Garcia Traid	1978–79	
(Spain) León Lasa	1979–80	
(Spain) Luis Cid	1979–81, 1984–86	
(Spain) Luis Aragonés	1981, 28 July 1997 – 30 June 1998	
(Spain) Pedro Buenaventura	1982, 1988–89	
(Hungary) Antal Dunai	1982	
(France) Marcel Domingo	1982–83	
(Spain) Pepe Alzate	1983–85	
(Spain) Luis del Sol	1985–87, 2001	
(England) John Mortimore	1987–88	
(Spain) Eusebio Ríos	1988	
(Paraguay) Cayetano Ré	1988–89	
(Spain) Juan Corbacho	1989	
(Spain) Julio Cardeñosa	1990	
(Spain) José Luis Romero	1990–91	
(Spain) José Ramón Esnaola	1991, 1993	
(Slovakia) Jozef Jarabinsky	1991–92	
(Argentina) Felipe Mesones	1992	
(Argentina) Jorge D'Alessandro	1992–93	
(Croatia) Sergije Krešić	1993–94	
(Spain) Lorenzo Serra Ferrer	1994–97, 1 July 2004 – 8 June 2006	Copa del Rey winner 2005; Qualified for 2005–2006 Champions League
(Portugal) António Oliveira	1998	
(Argentina) Vicente Cantatore	26 August 1998 – 26 October 1998	
(Spain) Javier Clemente	27 October 1998 – 30 June 1999	
(Argentina) Carlos Griguol	1999–00	
(Bosnia and Herzegovina) Faruk Hadžibegić	2 January 2000 – 30 June 2001	
(Netherlands) Guus Hiddink	1 February 2000 – 31 May 2000	
(Spain) Fernando Vázquez	1 July 2000 – 19 March 2001	
(Spain) Juande Ramos	1 July 2001 – 16 May 2002	
(Spain) Víctor Fernández	1 July 2002 – 30 June 2004, 26 January 2010 – 12 July 2010	
(Spain) Javier Irureta	1 July 2006 – 22 December 2006	
(France) Luis Fernández	27 December 2006 – 10 June 2007	
(Argentina) Héctor Cúper	14 July 2007 – 2 December 2007	
(Spain) Paco Chaparro	3 December 2007 – 7 April 2009	
(Spain) José María Nogués	7 April 2009 – 30 June 2009	
(Spain) Antonio Tapia	1 July 2009 – 25 January 2010	
(Spain) Pepe Mel	12 July 2010 – 2 December 2013, 19 December 2014 – 11 January 2016	Segunda champion, 2011 and 2015
(Spain) Juan Carlos Garrido	2 December 2013 – 19 January 2014	
(Argentina) Gabriel Calderón	19 January 2014 – 19 May 2014	
(Spain) Julio Velázquez	16 June 2014 – 25 November 2014	
(Spain) Juan Merino	25 November 2014 – 19 December 2014, 11 January 2016 – 9 May 2016	
(Uruguay) Gus Poyet	9 May 2016 – 12 November 2016	
(Spain) Víctor Sánchez	12 November 2016 – 9 May 2017	
(Spain) Alexis Trujillo	9 May 2017 – 26 May 2017	
(Spain) Quique Setién	26 May 2017 – 19 May 2019	
(Spain) Rubi	6 June 2019 – 21 June 2020	
(Chile) Manuel Pellegrini	9 July 2020 –	Copa del Rey winner 2022; UEFA Conference League runners-up 2025; Qualified for 2026–2027 Champions League

== Presidents ==
- SEVILLA BALOMPIÉ
  - Juan del Castillo Ochoa (1907–09)
  - Alfonso del Castillo Ochoa (1909–10)
  - José Gutiérrez Fernández (1910–11)
  - Juan del Castillo Ochoa (1912)
  - Herbert Richard Jones (1914)
- BETIS FÚTBOL CLUB
  - Eladio García de la Borbolla (1909)
  - Manuel Gutiérrez Fernández (1910–11)
  - Miguel Folgado (1913–14)
  - Pedro Rodríguez de la Borbolla (1914)
- REAL BETIS BALOMPIÉ
  - Herbert Richard Jones (1914–15)
  - Pedro Rodríguez de la Borbolla (1915–17)
  - Roberto Vicente de Mata (1917–18)
  - Eduardo Hernández Nalda (1918–19)
  - Carlos Alarcón de la Lastra (1919–20)
  - Jerónimo Pérez de Vargas (1920–21)
  - Carlos Alarcón de la Lastra (1921–22)
  - Gil Gómez Bajuelo (1922–23)
  - Ramón Navarro (1923–25)
  - Antonio Polo (1925–26)
  - Ramón Cortecero (1926–27)
  - Antonio de la Guardia (1927–28)
  - Ignacio Sánchez Mejías (1928–29)
  - Daniel Mezquita (1929–30)
  - Camilo Romero Sánchez (1930)
  - Adolfo Cuelliar Rodríguez (1930–31)
  - Jose Ignacio Mantecón (1931–33)
  - Antonio Moreno Sevillano (1933–39)
  - Ramón Poll (1940–42)
  - Alfonso Alarcón de Lastra (1942–43)
  - Francisco Cantalapiedra (1943–44)
  - Eduardo Benjumena (1944–45)
  - Manuel Romero Puerto (1945–46)
  - Filomeno de Aspe (1946–47)
  - Pascual Aparicio (1947–50)
  - Francisco de la Cerda (1950–52)
  - Manuel Ruiz Rodríguez (1952–55)
  - Benito Villamarín (1955–65)
  - Avelino Villamarín (1965–66)
  - Andrés Gaviño (1966–67)
  - Julio de la Puerta (1967–69)
  - José León (1969)
  - José Núñez Naranjo (1969–79)
  - Juan Manuel Mauduit (1979–83)
  - Gerardo Martínez Retamero (1983–89)
  - Hugo Galera (1989–92)
  - José León (1992–96)
  - Manuel Ruiz de Lopera (1996–2006)
  - José León (2006–10)
  - Jaime Rodríguez-Sacristán Cascajo (2010)
  - Rafael Gordillo (2010–11)
  - Miguel Guillén Vallejo (2011–2014)
  - Manuel Domínguez Platas (2014)
  - Juan Carlos Ollero Pina (2014–2016)
  - Ángel Haro García (2016–present)

== Records ==
=== Club records ===
- Best La Liga position: 1st (1934–35)
- Worst La Liga position: 20th (1990–91, 2013–14)
- Biggest home win: Betis 7–0 Zaragoza (1958–59)
- Biggest away win: Cádiz 0–5 Betis (1977–78)
- Biggest home defeat: Betis 0–5 Real Madrid (1960–61, 2013–14), Betis 0–5 Osasuna (2006–07), Betis 0–5 Barcelona (2017–18)
- Biggest away defeat: Athletic Bilbao 9–1 Betis (1932–33)
- Biggest comeback for: Betis – Barcelona: 0–2 to 3–2 (2007–08), Betis – Alavés: 0–2 to 3–2 (2020–21), Celta Vigo – Betis: 2–0 to 2–3 (2020–21)
- Biggest comeback against: Betis – Espanyol: 2–0 to 2–5 (1999–2000)

=== Player records ===
- Most appearances: (Spain) José Ramón Esnaola – 574
- Most official appearances: (Spain) José Ramón Esnaola – 460
- Most appearances in La Liga: (Spain) José Ramón Esnaola – 378
- Most appearances in Copa del Rey: (Spain) José Ramón Esnaola – 64
- Most appearances in European competitions: (Spain) Joaquín – 23
- Top goalscorer (La Liga): (Spain) Hipólito Rincón – 78
- Top goalscorer (overall): Rubén Castro – 148
- Top goalscorer (European competitions): (Democratic Republic of the Congo) Cédric Bakambu – 9
- Most red cards: (Spain) Jaime Quesada – 7
- First to play for Spain: Simón Lecue – 1934
- Most capped for Spain: Rafael Gordillo – 75
- Spanish internationals: 27

== Stadium ==
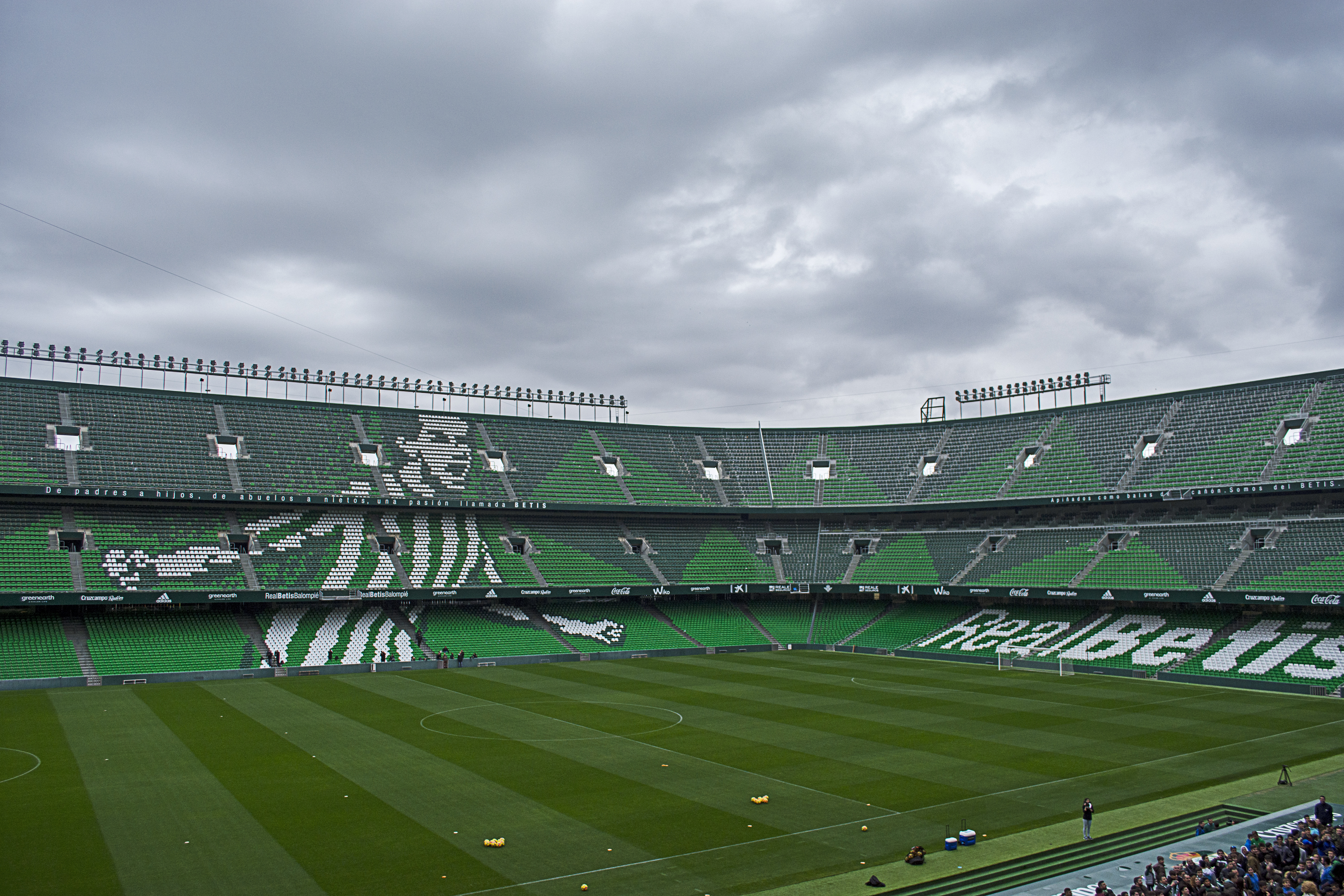
Estadio Benito Villamarín

Upon Real Betis' formation, the club played at the Campo del Huerto de Mariana. In 1909, Betis moved to the Campo del Prado de Santa Justa, moving to the Campo del Prado de San Sebastián, sharing the site with rivals Sevilla two years later. In 1918, Real Betis moved to the Campo del Patronato Obrero, with the first game at the ground coming against rivals Sevilla on 1 November 1918, resulting in a 5–1 loss for Real Betis. During the 1920s, the ground was redeveloped numerous times by club president Ignacio Sánchez Mejías. After the construction of the Estadio de la Exposición, the former name of Betis' current home, in 1929, Real Betis moved into the site officially in 1936, after playing a number of games at the stadium since its construction.

With a 60,720-seat capacity, the Estadio Benito Villamarín is the home ground of Real Betis. It was named Estadio Manuel Ruiz de Lopera during the 2000s after the club's owner, who decided to build a new stadium over the old one.

Despite much planning, the stadium's renovation plans were constantly postponed, and half of it remained unchanged. On 27 October 2010, it returned to its first denomination after a decision by the club's associates.

Due to a major renovation on Estadio Benito Villamarín, Real Betis will play their home matches at Estadio de La Cartuja from the 2025-26 season until 2028.

== Colours ==
=== Evolution ===
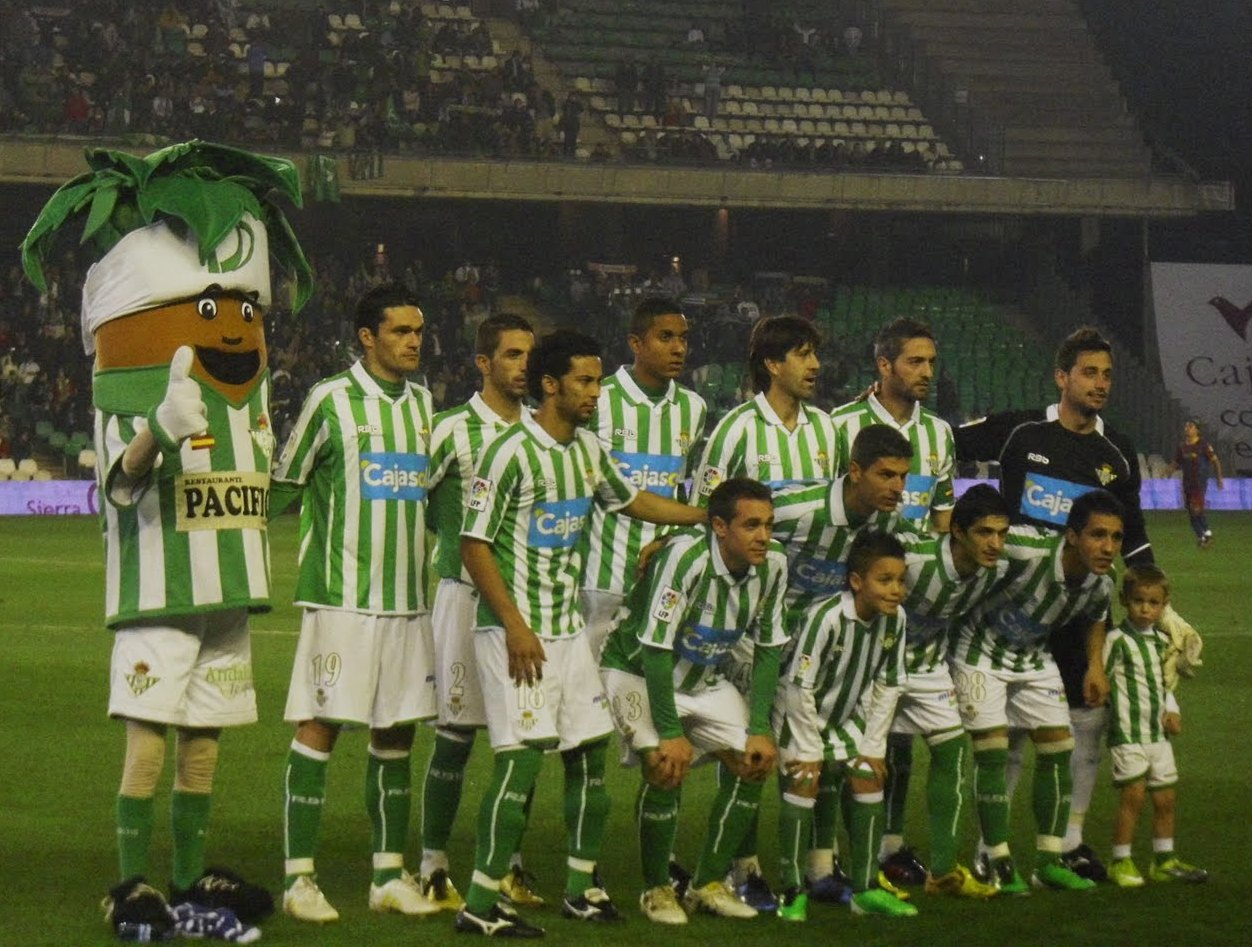
Betis' green-and-white vertically striped shirts are based on those worn by Celtic when an early player was studying in Scotland.

In its initial years, Sevilla Balompié dressed in blue shirts with white shorts, which represented the infantry at the time. From late 1911, the team had adopted the shirts of Celtic, at that time vertical stripes of green and white, that were brought over from Glasgow by Manuel Asensio Ramos, who had studied in Scotland as a child. On 28 February 2017, on the 37th Andalusia Day, Real Betis wore Celtic-inspired horizontal hoops against Málaga CF.

When the team became Real Betis Balompié in 1914, various kits were used, including: yellow and black stripes; green T-shirts and a reversion to the blue top and white shorts uniform. By the end of the 1920s, Betis was once again sporting green and white stripes, around this time the Assembly of Ronda (1918) saw the Andalusian region formally adopt these colours, not being known how much the two are linked.

Since then, this remained Betis' shirt, despite several versions (including wider stripes).

Together with the basic green-and-white shirt, Betis has wore both black and green shorts in addition to white shorts.

Viva El Betis Manque Pierda
