= Scotch =

Scotch most commonly refers to:

- Scotch (adjective), adjective meaning "of or from Scotland"
  - Scotch, old-fashioned name for the indigenous languages of the Scottish people:
    - Scots language ("Broad Scotch")
    - Scottish Gaelic ("Scotch Gaelic")
- Scotch whisky, a whisky made in Scotland, which outside Scotland is commonly abbreviated as "Scotch"

Scotch may also refer to:

== Places ==
- Scotch Corner, a junction of the A1 road and the A66 road in North Yorkshire, England

== Art, entertainment, and media ==
- Scotch (band), an Italian disco/pop group during the 1980s
- Hopscotch, a children's game
- Scotch Game, a chess opening

== Brands and enterprises ==
- Scotch, a brand name used by 3M until 1996 for recordable media, such as audio cassettes and video cassettes
- Scotch Tape, a commercial brand name for a type of adhesive tape made by 3M

== Food and drink ==
- Butterscotch, a confectionery
- Scotch ale, a type of strong ale found in Scotland and North East England
- Scotch Beef, beef from suckler cattle in Scotland with EU Protected Geographical Status
- Scotch broth, a soup made with mutton, barley, leeks, peas, carrots and swedes (rutabagas)
- Scotch egg, a hard boiled egg served wrapped in sausage meat and breadcrumbs, and fried
- Scotch pancake, a small, sweet pancake
- Scotch pie, a small, double-crust meat pie filled with minced mutton or other meat

== Materials and goods ==
- Scotch, a wedge used to prevent railway vehicles moving in clip and scotch
- Scotch gauge, a narrow gauge of railway used in Scotland and Japan
- Scotch key, pins inserted into holes drilled axially to fix an item such as a gear onto a shaft

== Typography ==
- Scotch Roman, a class of 19th century typefaces

== Computing ==
- The Scotch and PT-Scotch software for Graph partitioning

== Other uses ==
- Scotch College (disambiguation), several private schools associated with the Presbyterian Church and/or the Uniting Church, in Australia
- Scotch Mist (disambiguation)

== See also ==
- Scots (disambiguation)
- Scottish (disambiguation)
