= Juan del Castillo (footballer) =

English footballer and sports leader (1889–1977)

Personal information
- Date of birth: 31 July 1889
- Place of birth: Sevilla, Andalusia, Spain
- Date of death: 20 September 1977 (aged 88)
- Place of death: Sevilla, Andalusia, Spain

Senior career*
| Years | Team | Apps | (Gls) |
| 1907–1910 | Real Betis | | |
2nd president of Sevilla Balompié
In office 1909–1911
| Preceded by | Alfonso del Castillo Ochoa |
| Succeeded by | José Gutiérrez Fernández |
4th president of Sevilla Balompié
In office 1912–1914
| Preceded by | José Gutiérrez Fernández |
| Succeeded by | Herbert Richard Jones |
President of Real Betis
In office 1924–1924
| Preceded by | Gil Gómez Bajuelo |
| Succeeded by | Antonio Poll Roma |
- * Club domestic league appearances and goals

Juan del Castillo Ochoa (31 July 1889 – 20 September 1977) was a Spanish footballer who is widely regarded as one of the most important figures in the amateur beginnings of Real Betis, being one of its first founders in 1907, and then serving the club as its second president between 1909 and 1911, and again from 1912 and 1914. His older brother Alfonso was also president of Betis.

== Early life ==
Juan del Castillo Ochoa was born in 1887 in Seville, as the son of Pedro Del Castillo Zuloeta, a lieutenant colonel of the Artillery Weapon who lived in Seville at 29 Alfonso XII Street, and who was assigned years later to Cartagena.

== Sporting career ==
In 1907, the del Castillo brothers belonged to a group of young locals who was studying at the Polytechnic Academy of Seville, where some of them were pursuing careers such as topography or drafting while others were preparing to enter military academies, and they decided to found Sevilla Balompié, which was only the second football team in the city after Sevilla FC. A board of directors was subsequently elected, with Juan being appointed as the club's first treasurer, as well as its secretary, whose office was located in his home at 29 Alfonso XII Street.

In 1909, del Castillo was appointed as the club's second president, replacing his brother Alfonso, a position that he held for two years, until 1911, when he was replaced by José Gutiérrez Fernández, who only lasted a year, as he was then replaced in 1912 by del Castillo, who held the position for a further two years, until 1914, when he was replaced by Herbert Richard Jones. In the following decade, he was vice president during the 1924–25 season, during which he briefly served as the club's president again, replacing Gil Gómez Bajuelo and being replaced by Antonio Poll Roma.

== Later life and death ==
Outside sports, del Castillo was a colonel of the infantry. In December 1958, he was a member of the organizing committee of the commemorations of the club's 50th anniversary.

Del Castillo died in Sevilla on 20 September 1977, at the age of 88.
