= Scottian =

Scottian may refer to:

- Something of or related to Scottish writer Walter Scott
- An alumnus of Scott Christian College in Nagercoil, Tamil Nadu

== See also ==
- Nova Scotia, a Canadian province whose residents are referred to as Scotians
- Scott Ian (born 1963), an American musician
- Scott (disambiguation)
- Scottish (disambiguation)
