= Alfonso del Castillo =

Spanish sports leader (1885–1950)

1st president of Sevilla Balompié
- In office 14 September 1914 – December 1914
- Preceded by: Juan del Castillo Ochoa

Personal details
- Born: Alfonso del Castillo Ochoa; 1887; Sevilla, Andalusia, Spain
- Died: 19 December 1962 (aged 74–75); Cartagena, Spain

Alfonso del Castillo Ochoa (1887 – 19 December 1962) was a Spanish footballer who is widely regarded as one of the most important figures in the amateur beginnings of Real Betis, being one of its first founders in 1907, and then serving the club as its first president from 1907 until 1909. His younger brother Juan was also president of Betis.

== Early life and education ==
Alfonso del Castillo Ochoa was born in 1887 in Seville, into a family with a long military ancestry, including his father, Pedro Del Castillo Zuloeta, a lieutenant colonel of the Artillery Weapon, who lived in Seville at 29 Alfonso XII Street. He completed his studied in Seville, earning a degree in mining engineering.

== Sporting career ==
In 1907, the del Castillo brothers belonged to a group of young locals who was studying at the Polytechnic Academy of Seville, where some of them were pursuing careers such as topography or drafting while others were preparing to enter military academies, and they decided to found Sevilla Balompié, which was only the second football team in the city after Sevilla FC. A board of directors was subsequently elected, with Alfonso being appointed as the club's first president, a position that he held for two years, until 1909, when he was replaced by his brother Juan.

== Later life and death ==
When his father was assigned to Cartagena, Spain in 1909, del Castillo decided to go with him, and while there, he met his future wife Caridad Martínez Delgado, daughter of Enrique Martínez Muñoz, who had co-founded the first graduate schools in Spain, and the couple had eight children, two boys and six girls, as well as many grandchildren. As a result, several Cartagena residents are direct descendants of Alfonso del Castillo, such as his grandson Emilio Cerezuela Del Castillo, a well-known Cartagena lawyer who received a commemorative medal on the occasion of Betis' 50th anniversary.

Del Castillo died in Cartagena, on 19 December 1962, at the age of 75.

== Legacy ==
On the occasion of the club's centenary, Betis called numerous of his relatives in Cartagena to inquire about photos and information for the "Centenary Book", which was published a couple of years later.
