= Andalusia Championship =

Football competition in Spain

Andalusia Championship Campeonato Regional Sur
- Organising body: Southern Football Federation
- Founded: 1915
- First season: 1915
- Folded: 1940
- Country: Spain
- Feeder to: Copa del Rey
- Last champions: Sevilla (1939–40)
- Most championships: Sevilla (17 titles)

The Campeonato Regional Sur (South Regional Championship), sometimes known as the Copa de Andalucía, was an annual association football competition for clubs based in the Andalusia region of Spain between 1915 and 1940, organised by the Southern Football Federation.

== History ==
Matches had been played to decide a champion of Andalusia on an informal basis since 1910, with Recreativo de Huelva winning three editions of a tournament which the club themselves organised, before Español de Cádiz did likewise on two occasions. Following disputes in other regions, the Royal Spanish Football Federation had decided that the national cup competition, the Copa del Rey, would be contested by winners of the various regions of the country from the 1914 edition onwards, and it became necessary to arrange a formal Andalusian championship to provide an entrant. The Southern Football Federation (Federación Regional Sur, later the Royal Andalusian Football Federation - Real Federación Andaluza de Fútbol) was formed to organise the new competition. The first championship was won by Español de Cádiz, but they declined to enter the 1916 Copa del Rey; from then on, Sevilla were the region's dominant force, with only occasional interruptions to their runs of victories. Initially open to all clubs paying a small fee, in 1921 the top division was set based on the previous season's performance, with entries to the second division requiring approval by the Federation assembly. Generally the top division contained a single group with the bottom club being relegated, while the lower division was played with geographical splits (either on a provincial or an Eastern/Upper and Western/Lower sub-regional basis), though occasionally the top division had groups and a regional championship play-off. From 1926, the runners-up in each region also entered the Copa del Rey.

In the early 1930s, following the inception of La Liga, several merged or unified regional competitions were held, and in Andalusia this manifested as the Campeonato Mancomunado Castilla-Sur with teams from the Centro region, i.e. the Community of Madrid, in 1932–33 and 1933–34 (the capital teams held the upper hand in both seasons), followed by the Campeonato Supraregional Levante-Sur with teams from the Levante region, i.e. the Valencian Community, in 1934–35 – Sevilla did not win this league but qualified for the 1935 Copa del Presidente de la República and went on to win it, the first club from the region to do so (city rivals Betis had lost in the 1931 final and became the first Andalusian club to win the national Liga title in the same year as Sevilla's Copa victory, the only occasion the region provided the winners of both competitions in the same season).

In 1935–36 the championship reverted to Andalusia only, with all six of the top division participants qualifying for the 1936 Copa del Presidente de la República. The Spanish Civil War then caused almost all football to be cancelled for two years, with two final editions of the regional championship being played in early 1939 (Sevilla went on to win the 1939 Torneo Nacional – the one-season name for the national competition before it was re-titled the Copa del Generalísimo for Francisco Franco) and in 1939–40 before they were abolished as a cup qualification method across Spain, having declined in prestige over the previous decade (some continued to be contested on a local basis for some time).

== Seasons summary ==
Season	Champion	Copa del Rey (Note: Progress made in the Copa del Rey by qualifiers from the regional championship.)	Runners-up	Copa del Rey (Note: Runners-up also qualified for the Copa del Rey from 1926.)
1915–16	Español de Cádiz	did not enter	Sevilla	N/A
1916–17	Sevilla	Quarter-final	Recreativo	N/A
1917–18	Recreativo	Semi-final	Sevilla	N/A
1918–19	Sevilla	Semi-final	Recreativo	N/A
1919–20	Sevilla	Quarter-final	Real Betis	N/A
1920–21	Sevilla	Semi-final	Real Betis	N/A
1921–22	Sevilla	Quarter-final	Español de Cádiz (Note: Real Betis finished 2nd in the league but did not appear for the play-off and were disqualified.)	N/A
1922–23	Sevilla	Quarter-final	Real Betis	N/A
1923–24	Sevilla	Quarter-final	Real Betis	N/A
1924–25	Sevilla	Group Stage	Real Betis	N/A
1925–26	Sevilla	Group Stage	Real Betis	Group Stage
1926–27	Sevilla	Group Stage	Real Betis	Quarter-final
1927–28	Real Betis	Group Stage	Sevilla	Group stage
1928–29	Sevilla	Quarter-final	Real Betis	Round of 32
1929–30	Sevilla	Round of 16	Real Betis	Round of 16
1930–31	Sevilla	Round of 16	Real Betis	Runners-up
1931–32	Sevilla	Round of 32	Betis Balompié (Note: Real Betis changed its name due to the demands of the Spanish Second Republic.)	Round of 16
1932–33	Clubs played in the Campeonato Regional Mancomunado Centro-Sur with those from Madrid and Castile – Betis (2nd) and Sevilla (5th) qualified for the 1933 Copa del Presidente de la República.			
1933–34	Clubs played in the Campeonato Regional Mancomunado Centro-Sur with those from Madrid and Castile – Betis (3rd) and Sevilla (4th) qualified for the 1934 Copa del Presidente de la República.			
1934–35	Clubs played in the Campeonato Supraregional Levante-Sur with those from Valencia and Murcia – Sevilla (2nd) and Betis (5th) qualified for the 1935 Copa del Presidente de la República, Sevilla winning the competition.			
1935–36	Sevilla	Round of 16	Xerez	Round of 16
1937–1938	No competition due to the Spanish Civil War			
1939	Sevilla	Winners	Real Betis	Round of 12
1939–40	Sevilla	Quarter-final	Real Betis	Round of 16

== Performances ==
Club	Winners	Runner-up	Winning years	Runner-up years
Sevilla	17	3	1916–17, 1918–19, 1919–20, 1920–21, 1921–22, 1922–23, 1923–24, 1924–25, 1925–26, 1926–27, 1928–29, 1929–30, 1930–31, 1931–32, 1935–36, 1939, 1939–40	1915–16, 1917–18, 1927–28 (Note: Also runners-up in the 1934–35 Campeonato Supraregional Levante-Sur.)
Real Betis	1	13	1927–28	1919–20, 1920–21, 1922–23, 1923–24, 1924–25, 1925–26, 1926–27, 1928–29, 1929–30, 1930–31, 1931–32, 1939, 1939–40 (Note: Also runners-up in the 1932–33 Campeonato Regional Mancomunado Centro-Sur.)
Recreativo	1	2	1917–18	1916–17, 1918–19
Cádiz	1	1	1915–16	1921–22
Xerez	–	1	–	1935–36

== See also ==
- Andalusia autonomous football team
