= Scotch mist =

Scotch mist may refer to:

== Language ==
- Scotch mist is a phrase that describes precipitation composed of both fog or mist and a heavy drizzle.
- "Scotch mist", a slang expression for "nothing at all" similar to "Fanny Adams"

== Plants ==
- A common name of the plant species Galium sylvaticum.
- Cryptanthus 'Scotch Mist', a cultivar of flowering plant Cryptanthus marginatus

== Arts and entertainment ==
- Scotch Mist, a former name of the band Pilot
- Scotch Mist (play), a 1926 play by Patrick Hastings
- "Scotch Mist", a 1960 musical composition by Kenneth Ascher
- "Scotch Mist", an episode of TV series Garth Marenghi's Darkplace
- "Scotch Mist", a track on the CD reissue of the 1971 album Fog on the Tyne by Lindisfarne
- Scotch Mist, a webcast by Radiohead promoting their 2007 album In Rainbows

== Other uses ==
- Scotch mist (cocktail), a cocktail based on whisky in Scottish cuisine
