= Josep María Nogués =

Spanish footballer and manager

Personal information
- Full name: Josep María Nogués Salvatella
- Date of birth: 29 April 1959 (age 67)
- Place of birth: Barcelona, Spain
- Position: Midfielder

Senior career*
| Years | Team | Apps | (Gls) |
- Reus
- Lloret
- Júpiter

Managerial career
- 1994–1996: Hospitalet
- 1997–1999: Terrassa
- 1999–2002: Gimnàstic
- 2002–2004: Jaén
- 2005: Girona
- 2007–2008: Écija
- 2008–2009: Betis B
- 2009: Betis
- 2009–2010: Poli Ejido
- 2016–2018: Paradou AC
- 2018: CA Bordj Bou Arreridj
- * Club domestic league appearances and goals

Josep María Nogués Salvatella (born 29 April 1959) is a Spanish retired footballer who played as a midfielder, and a manager.

== Managerial career ==
Born in Barcelona, Catalonia, Nogués has previously coached teams in the Tercera and Segunda División, which includes L'Hospitalet (1993–1995), Terrassa (1995–1996), Gimnàstic de Tarragona (1997–1999), Real Jaén (2002–2004), Girona (2005), Écija Balompié (2007–2008) and Betis reserve team, Real Betis B (2008–2009).

On 6 April 2009, Nogués was appointed the new manager of Real Betis after the sacking of Paco Chaparro. His first game in charge ended in a 3–2 win over Racing de Santander, followed by two losses to Valencia 1–2 and Atlético Madrid 0–2. Nogués won his second game against Sporting de Gijón 2–0. He managed clubs in Algeria first with Paradou AC in 2016 to 2018 and a short spell with CA Bordj Bou Arreridj in 2018.
