= Manuel Ruiz de Lopera =

Spanish football executive (1944–2024)

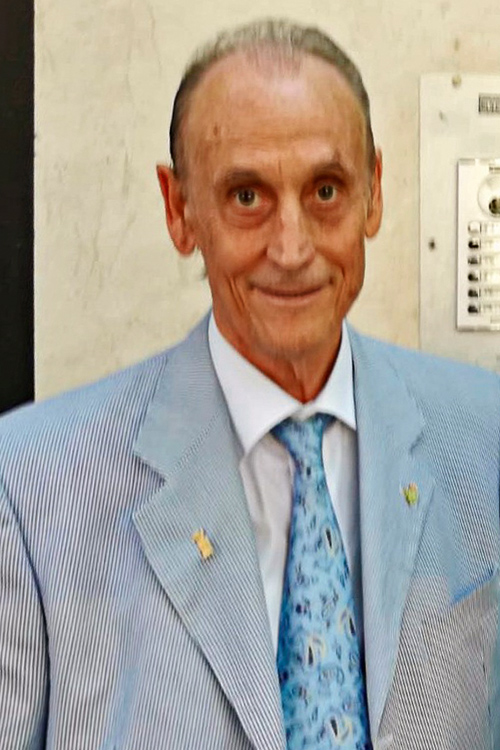
- Lopera in 2018
- Born: Manuel Ruiz de Lopera y Ávalos; 13 August 1944; Seville, Spain
- Died: 23 March 2024 (aged 79); Seville, Spain
- Occupation: Businessman
- Known for: Owner (1992–2010) and president (1992–2006) of Real Betis

Manuel Ruiz de Lopera y Ávalos (13 August 1944 – 23 March 2024) was a Spanish businessman who was owner and chairman of football club Real Betis.

The team's stadium was named after him from 2000 to 2010, when it reverted to its previous name, Estadio Benito Villamarín.

Ruiz de Lopera died on 23 March 2024, at the age of 79.
