= Scotch-Irish =

Scotch-Irish or Scots-Irish may refer to:

- Ulster Scots people, an ethnic group in Ulster, Ireland, who trace their roots to settlers from Scotland
- Scotch-Irish Americans, descendants of Ulster Scots who first migrated to America in large numbers in the 18th and 19th centuries
- Scotch-Irish Canadians, descendants of Ulster Scots who migrated to Canada
- Scotch Irish Township, Rowan County, North Carolina, United States
