= Español de Cádiz =

Spanish football club

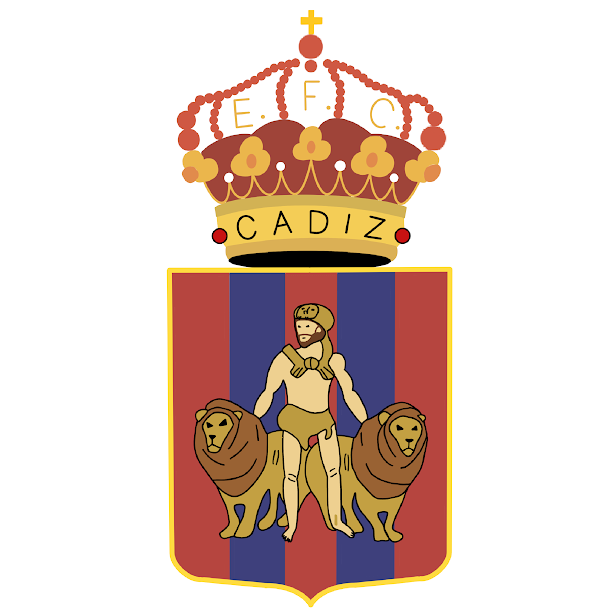
- Badge of Español de Cádiz
- Full name: Español de Cádiz
- Founded: 14 January 1911
- Dissolved: 22 July 1928
- Ground: Campo de Ana de Viya
- League: Campeonato Regional Sur

Español de Cádiz was a football team from Cádiz, Andalusia. They played in the Andalusia Championship between 1915 and 1928. Their best performances was to win its first edition of 1915–16. They had the right to play in the 1916 Copa del Rey after winning the Andalusia Championship, but did not inscribe for the tournament.
