= Scots =

Scots may refer to:

== People and cultures ==
- Scots language
- Scottish people
- Scoti, a Latin name for the Gaels

== Other uses ==
- SCOTS, abbreviation for Royal Regiment of Scotland
- Scottish Corpus of Texts and Speech (SCOTS), a linguistic resource
- Southern Culture on the Skids (SCOTS), an American rock band
- Scot's Lo-Cost, a grocery store owned by Weis Markets

== See also ==
- Scotch (disambiguation)
- Scots Church (disambiguation)
- Scots College (disambiguation)
- Scott's (disambiguation)
- Scottish (disambiguation)
- Scotts (disambiguation)
- Pound Scots, historical currency
- Scots pine, a species of tree
