= Scottish =

Scottish usually refers to something of, from, or related to Scotland, including:

- Scottish Gaelic, a Celtic Goidelic language of the Indo-European language family native to Scotland
- Scottish English
- Scottish national identity, the Scottish identity and common culture
- Scottish people, a nation and ethnic group native to Scotland
- Scots language, a West Germanic language spoken in lowland Scotland
- Symphony No. 3 (Mendelssohn), a symphony by Felix Mendelssohn known as the Scottish

== See also ==
- Scotch (disambiguation)
- Scotland (disambiguation)
- Scots (disambiguation)
- Scottian (disambiguation)
- Schottische
