= Paco Chaparro =

Spanish footballer and manager

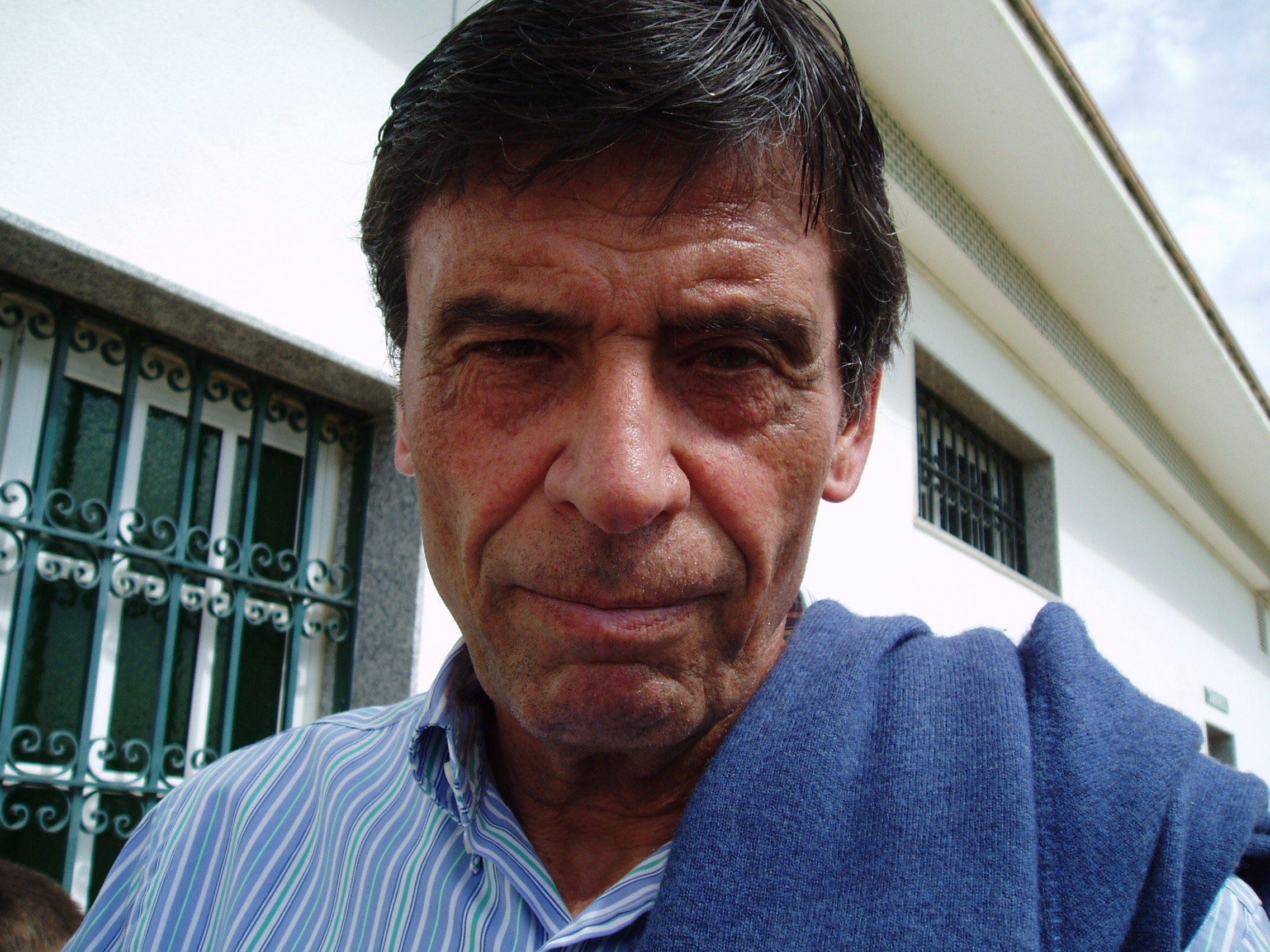
Chaparro during his spell with Betis

Francisco "Paco" Chaparro Jara (born 30 November 1942) is a Spanish retired football forward and manager.

== Football career ==
Chaparro was born in Seville, Andalusia. After a playing career that ended at the age of 30 due to a knee injury, and with the biggest accomplishment being appearing for Rayo Vallecano in the Segunda División, Chaparro began his senior coaching career with Extremadura also in that level. He subsequently moved to the lower leagues, where he worked with Cádiz, Granada and Écija (where he would serve in several capacities and in different seasons) and Xerez back in the second tier, before arriving at neighbours Real Betis' youth academy.

Subsequently, Chaparro worked as an assistant at the Verdiblancos. In the final day of the 2006–07 season he replaced the sacked Luis Fernández at the helm of the first team, leading them to a 2–0 away win against Racing de Santander as the club narrowly avoided La Liga relegation. The reserves, which he also coached, managed to promote to Segunda División B.

Chaparro returned to the B's for the 2007–08 campaign, but was again called for main-squad duties after Héctor Cúper only managed 11 points from 14 matches. His first game in charge was a 1–0 victory at Villarreal, Betis retained their top-flight status and he had his contract renewed for another year.

On 6 April 2009, after five consecutive draws (the last 3–3 at home against Numancia) and two months without a win, Chaparro was dismissed; the side was eventually relegated.
