= Pepe León =

Spanish football club president (1936–2026)

José "Pepe" León Gómez (26 February 1936 – 9 July 2026) was a Spanish football club president who was a three-time chairman of Real Betis Balompié.

== Biography ==
León was born in Dos Hermanas, Seville on 26 February 1936. He made his fortune as an industrialist.

In January 2021, he was given a fine and suspended sentence by a Spanish court for irregularities during his tenure.

León died on 9 July 2026, at the age of 90.
